= Transjordan (region) =

Part of the Southern Levant east of the Jordan River

Transjordan شرق الأردن Sharq al ʾUrdun East Bank Transjordanian Highlands
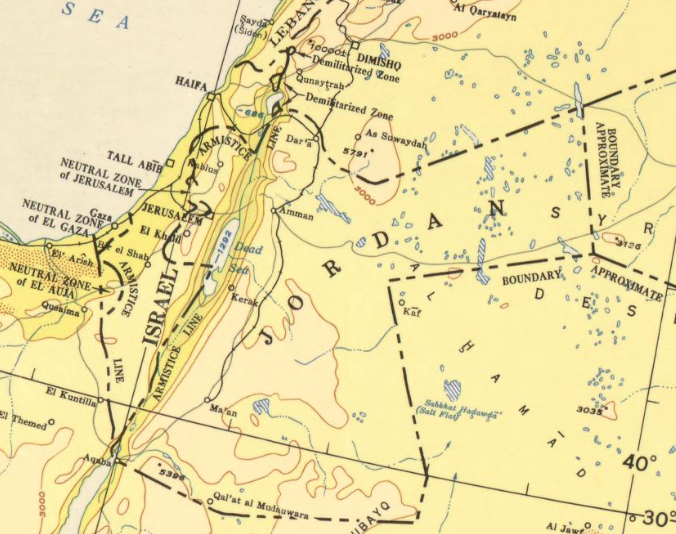
- Map of Transjordan in 1955
- Countries: Jordan
- Demonym: Transjordanian

Transjordan, also known as the East Bank or the Transjordanian Highlands (Arabic: شرق الأردن, romanized: Sharq al ʾUrdun, lit. 'East of the Jordan'), is the part of the Southern Levant east of the Jordan River, mostly contained in present-day Jordan.

The region known as Transjordan has been controlled by numerous empires and states throughout history, including the Nabataean Kingdom, which established its capital at Petra. During the early modern period, the region of Transjordan was under the jurisdiction of Ottoman Syria. After the Great Arab Revolt against Ottoman rule during the 1910s, the Emirate of Transjordan was established in 1921 by Hashemite Emir Abdullah, becoming a British protectorate. In 1946, the emirate achieved independence from the British, and in 1949 changed its name to the "Hashemite Kingdom of Jordan", following the Jordanian annexation of the West Bank after the 1948 Arab–Israeli War.

== Name ==
The prefix trans- is Latin and means "across" or beyond, and so "Transjordan" refers to the land on the other side of the Jordan River. The equivalent term for the west side is the Cisjordan – literally, "on this side of the [River] Jordan".

The Tanakh's Hebrew: בעבר הַיַּרְדֵּן מִזְרָח הַשֶּׁמֶשׁ, romanized: bʿēḇer hayyardēn mizrāḥ haššemeš, lit. 'beyond the Jordan towards the sunrise', is translated in the Septuagint to Ancient Greek: πέραν τοῦ Ιορδάνου,, romanized: translit. péran toú Iordánou,, lit. 'beyond the Jordan', which was then translated to Latin: trans Iordanen, lit. 'beyond the Jordan' in the Vulgate. However, some authors give the Hebrew: עבר הירדן, romanized: ʿēḇer hayyardēn, lit. 'beyond the Jordan', as the basis for Transjordan, which is also the Modern Hebrew usage. Whereas the term "East" as in "towards the sunrise" is used in Arabic: شرق الأردن, romanized: Sharq al ʾUrdun, lit. 'East of the Jordan'.

== History ==
=== Egyptian period ===
Egyptian provinces of the Retjenu, Amurru, and Apu regions 1300 BCE

The historical Semitic region, defined by the pre-Islamic distribution of Semitic languages (very roughly coinciding; culturally, politically, and historically).

The Shasu were Semitic-speaking cattle nomads in the Levant from the late Bronze Age to the Early Iron Age. In a 15th-century BCE list of enemies inscribed on column bases at the temple of Soleb built by Amenhotep III, six groups of Shasu are noted; the Shasu of S'rr, the Shasu of Rbn, the Shasu of Sm't, the Shasu of Wrbr, the Shasu of Yhw, and the Shasu of Pysps. Some scholars link the Israelites and the worship of a deity named Yahweh with the Shasu.

The Egyptian geographical term Retjenu is traditionally identified as an area covering Sinai and Canaan south of Lebanon, with the regions of Amurru and Apu to the north. As such, parts of Canaan and southwestern Syria became tributary to the pharaohs of ancient Egypt before the Late Bronze Age collapse. When Canaanite confederacies centered on Megiddo and Kadesh came under the control of the New Kingdom of Egypt. However, the empire's control was sporadic, and not strong enough to prevent frequent local rebellions and inter-city conflict.

=== Bronze Age collapse ===
During the Late Bronze Age collapse the Amorites of Syria disappeared after being displaced or absorbed by a new wave of semi-nomadic West Semitic-speaking peoples known collectively as the Ahlamu. Over time, the Arameans emerged as the dominant tribe amongst the Ahlamu; with the destruction of the Hittites and the decline of Assyria in the late 11th century BCE, they gained control over much of Syria. The regions they inhabited became known as Aram (Aramea) and Eber-Nari.

=== The Transjordanian Hebrew tribes ===
Assignment of Transjordan to the tribes; Reuben, Gad, and the half-tribe of Manasseh, per the Book of Joshua

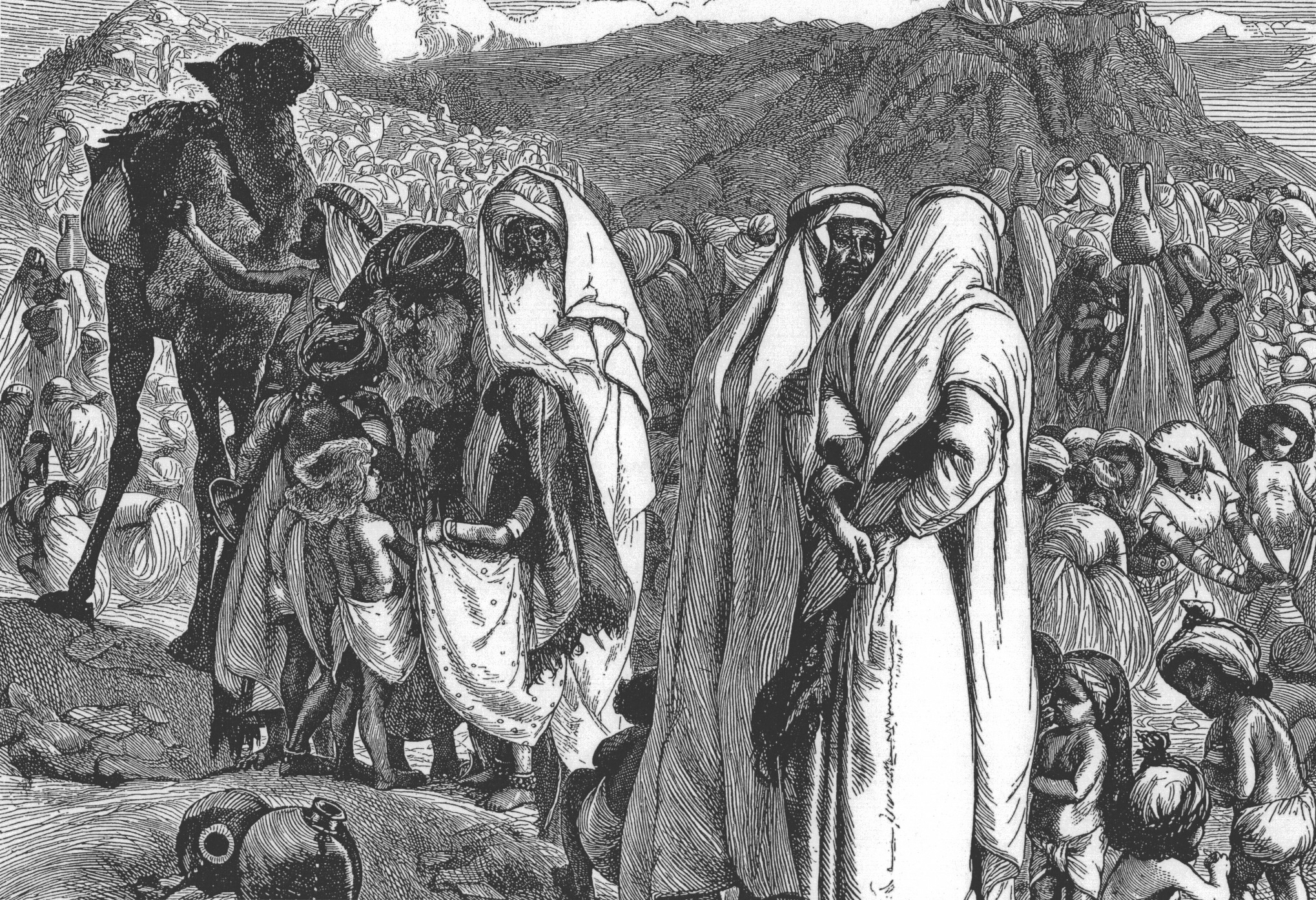
Reuben and Gad Ask for Land, engraving by Arthur Boyd Houghton based on Numbers 32.

The Book of Numbers (chapter 32) tells how the tribes of Reuben and Gad came to Moses to ask if they could settle in the Transjordan. Moses is dubious, but the two tribes promise to join in the conquest of the land, so Moses grants them this region to live in. The Tribe of Manasseh is not mentioned until verse 33. David Jobling suggests that this is because Manasseh settled in the land that previously belonged to Og north of the Zarqa, while Reuben and Gad settled Sihon's land, which lay south of the Zarqa. Since Og's territory was not on the route to Canaan, it was "more naturally part of the Promised Land", and so the Manassites' status is less problematic than that of the Reubenites or Gadites.

In Joshua 1, Joshua affirms Moses' decision and urges the men of the two-and-a-half tribes to help in the conquest, which they are willing to do. In Joshua 22, the Transjordanian tribes returned and built a massive altar called the Witness by the Jordan River. This causes the "whole congregation of the Israelites" to prepare for war. They first sent a delegation to the Transjordanians, accusing them of making God angry and suggesting their land may be unclean. In response to this, the Transjordanians said that the altar is not for offerings, but is only a "witness". The western tribes were satisfied and returned home. Assis argues that the unusual dimensions of the altar suggest that it "was not meant for sacrificial use", but was, in fact, "meant to attract the attention of the other tribes" and provoke a reaction.

Per the settlement of the Israelite tribes east of the Jordan, Burton MacDonald notes;

There are various traditions behind the Books of Numbers, Deuteronomy, Joshua, Judges, and 1 Chronicles' assignment of tribal territories and towns to Reuben, Gad, and the half-tribe of Manasseh. Some of these traditions provide only an idealized picture of Israelite possessions east of the Jordan; others are no more than vague generalizations. Num 21.21–35, for example, says only that the land the people occupied extended from Wadi Arnon to Wadi Jabbok, the boundary of the Amorites.

==== Status ====
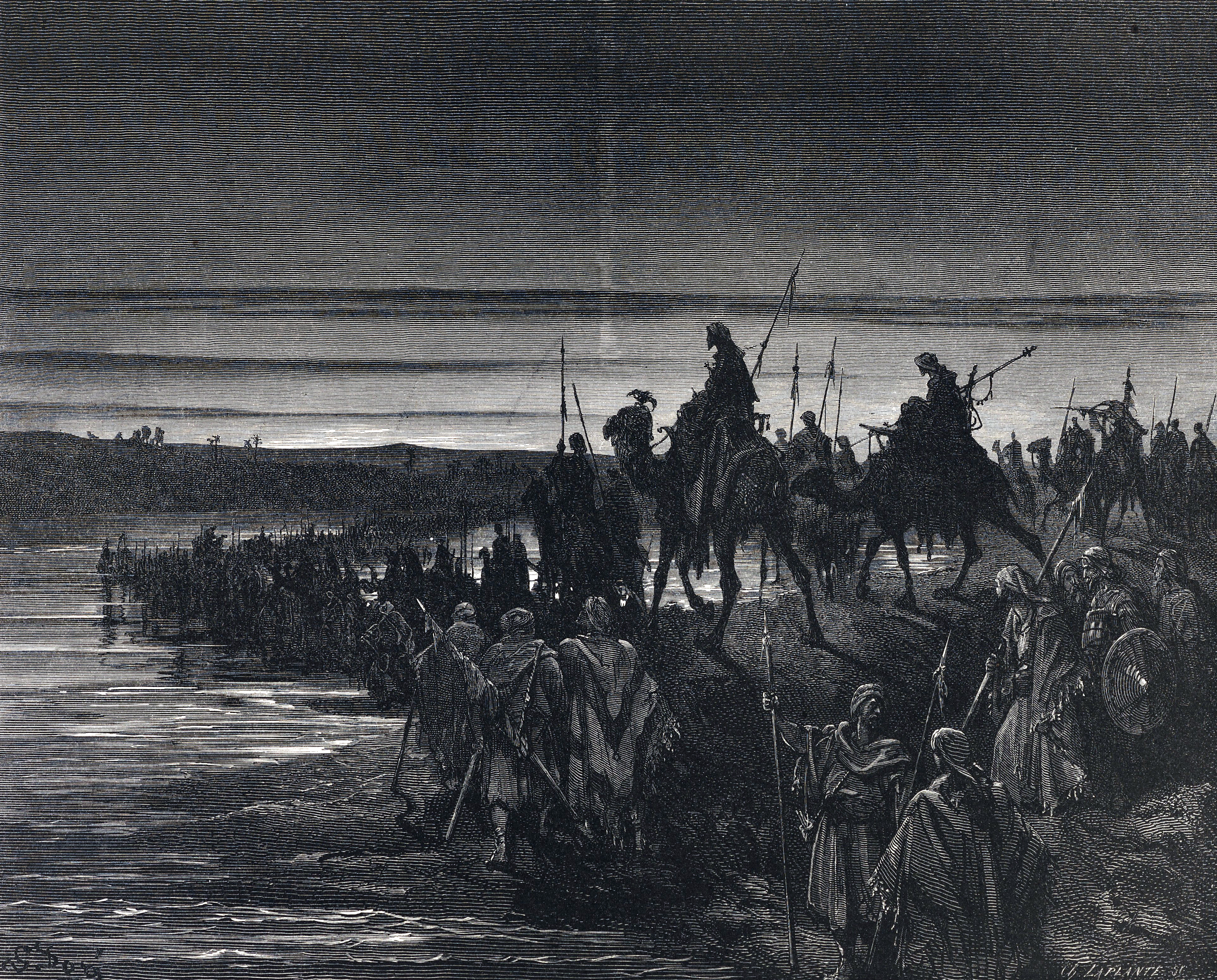
The Children of Israel Crossing the Jordan, engraving by Gustave Doré. Moshe Weinfeld argues that in the Book of Joshua, the Jordan is portrayed as "a barrier to the promised land."

There is some ambiguity about the status of the Transjordan in the mind of the biblical writers. Horst Seebass argues that in Numbers "one finds awareness of Transjordan as being holy to YHWH." He argues for this based on the presence of the Cities of Refuge there, and because land taken in a holy war is always holy. Richard Hess, on the other hand, asserts that "the Transjordanian tribes were not in the land of promise." Moshe Weinfeld argues that in the Book of Joshua, the Jordan is portrayed as "a barrier to the promised land", but in Deuteronomy 1:7 and 11:24, the Transjordan is an "integral part of the promised land."

Unlike the other tribal allotments in Joshua, the Transjordanian territory was not divided by lot. Jacob Milgrom suggests that it is assigned by Moses rather than by God.

Lori Rowlett argues that in the Book of Joshua, the Transjordanian tribes function as the inverse of the Gibeonites (mentioned in Joshua 9). Whereas the former have the right ethnicity, but wrong geographical location, the latter have the wrong ethnicity, but are "within the boundary of the 'pure' geographical location."

=== Other Transjordanian nations ===
According to Genesis, (19:37–38), Ammon and Moab were born to Lot and Lot's younger and elder daughters, respectively, in the aftermath of the destruction of Sodom and Gomorrah. The Bible refers to both the Ammonites and Moabites as the "children of Lot". Throughout the Bible, the Ammonites and Israelites are portrayed as mutual antagonists. During the Exodus, the Israelites were prohibited by the Ammonites from passing through their lands (Deuteronomy 23:4). In the Book of Judges, the Ammonites work with Eglon, king of the Moabites, against Israel. Attacks by the Ammonites on Israelite communities east of the Jordan were the impetus behind the unification of the tribes under Saul (1 Samuel 11:1–15).

According to both Books of Kings (14:21–31) and Books of Chronicles (12:13), Naamah was an Ammonite. She was the only wife of King Solomon to be mentioned by name in the Tanakh as having borne a child. She was the mother of Solomon's successor, Rehoboam.

The Ammonites presented a serious problem to the Pharisees because many marriages with Ammonite (and Moabite) wives had taken place in the days of Nehemiah (Nehemiah 13:23). The men had married women of the various nations without conversion, which made the children not Jewish. The legitimacy of David's claim to royalty was disputed on account of his descent from Ruth, the Moabite. King David spent time in the Transjordan after he had fled from the rebellion of his son Absalom (2 Samuel 17–19).

=== Classical period ===
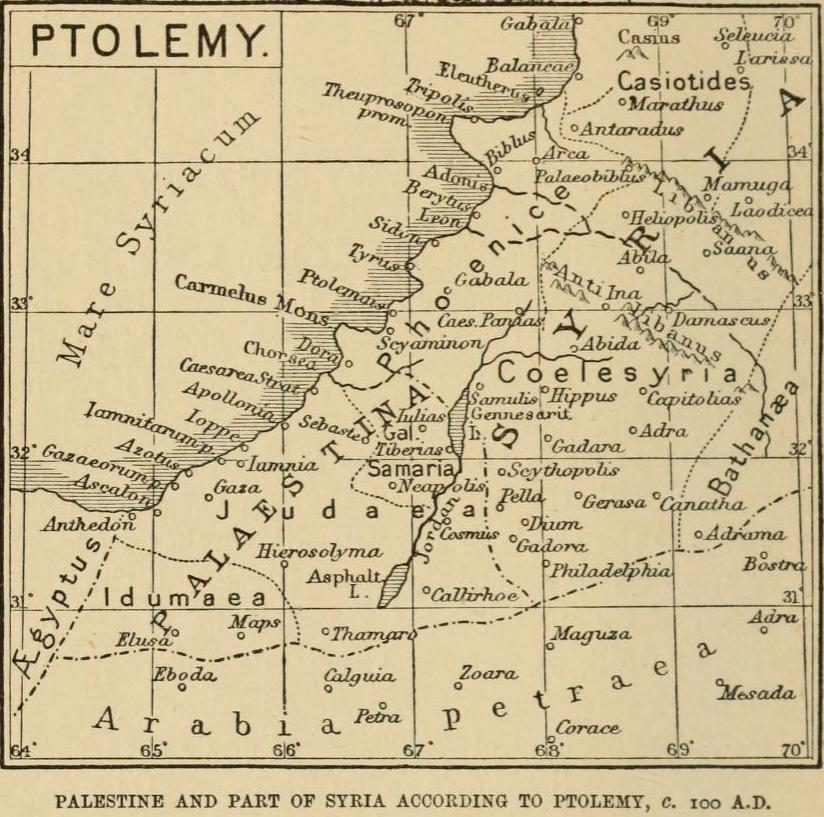
Palestine and Coele-Syria according to Ptolemy (map by Claude Reignier Conder of the Palestine Exploration Fund)

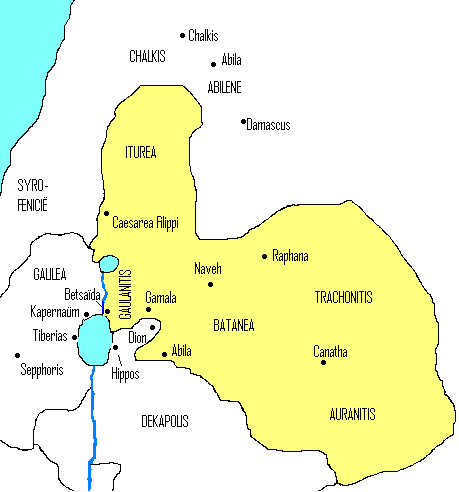
Iturea, Gaulanitis (Golan), Trachonitis (Lajat), Auranitis (Hauran), and Batanaea in the first century CE.

Cities of the Decapolis

The Decapolis is named from its ten cities enumerated by Pliny the Elder (23–79). What Pliny calls Decapolis, Ptolemy (c. 100–c. 170) calls Cœle-Syria. Ptolemy does not use the term "Transjordan", but rather the periphrasis "across the Jordan". And he enumerates the cities; Cosmas, Libias, Callirhoe, Gazorus, Epicaeros—as being in this district—east of the Jordan, that Josephus et al. called Perea.

Jerash was a prominent central community for the surrounding region during the Neolithic period and was also inhabited during the Bronze Age. Ancient Greek inscriptions from the city, and the literary works of Iamblichus and the Etymologicum Magnum indicate that the city was founded as "Gerasa" by Alexander the Great or his general Perdiccas, for the purpose of settling retired Macedonian soldiers (γῆρας—gēras—means "old age" in Ancient Greek). It was a city of the Decapolis, and is one of the most important and best preserved Ancient Roman cities in the Near East.

The Nabataeans' trading network was centered on strings of oases that they controlled. The Nabataean Kingdom reached its territorial zenith during the reign of Aretas III (87-62 BCE), when it encompassed parts of the territory of modern Jordan, Syria, Saudi Arabia, Egypt and Israel.

Bosra is located in a geographical area called the Hauran plateau. The soil of this volcanic plateau made it a fertile region for the cultivation of domesticated cereals during the Neolithic Agricultural Revolution. The city was noted in Egyptian documents of the 14th century BCE, and was situated on the trade routes where caravans brought spices from India and the Far East across the eastern desert while other caravans brought myrrh and frankincense from the south. The region of Hauran then called "Auranitis" came under the control of the Nabataean kingdom. And the city of Bosra then called "Bostra" became the northern capital of the kingdom while its southern capital was Petra. After Pompey's military conquest of Syria, Judaea and Transjordan, control of the city was transferred to Herod the Great and his heirs until 106 CE, when Bosra was incorporated into the new Roman province of Arabia Petraea.

The Herodian kingdom of Judaea was a client state of the Roman Republic from 37 BCE, and included Samaria and Perea. And when Herod died in 4 BCE, the kingdom was divided among his sons into the Herodian Tetrarchy.

Provincia Arabia Petraea or simply Arabia, was a frontier province of the Roman Empire beginning in the 2nd century. It consisted of the former Nabataean kingdom in the southern Levant, the Sinai Peninsula, and parts of the northwestern Arabian peninsula.

=== Crusader period: Oultrejordain ===
The Lordship of Oultrejordain (Old French for "beyond the Jordan"), also called the Lordship of Montreal, otherwise Transjordan, was part of the Crusader Kingdom of Jerusalem.

== Trade routes ==
Roman roads

- Via Maris
- Via Traiana Nova
- Petra Roman Road

The King's Highway was a trade route of vital importance to the ancient Near East. It began in Egypt and stretched across the Sinai Peninsula to Aqaba. From there it turned northward across Transjordan, leading to Damascus and the Euphrates River. During the Roman period the road was called Via Regia (Orient). Emperor Trajan rebuilt and renamed it Via Traiana Nova (viz. Via Traiana Roma), under which name it served as a military and trade road along the fortified Limes Arabicus.

The Incense Route comprised a network of major ancient land and sea trading routes linking the Mediterranean world with Eastern and Southern sources of incense, spices and other luxury goods, stretching from Mediterranean ports across the Levant and Egypt through Northeastern Africa and Arabia to India and beyond. The overland incense trade from South Arabia to the Mediterranean flourished from roughly the 7th century BCE to the 2nd century CE.

Though not essentially connected to a trade-route, Transjordan maintained its relative importance once it gained a status of independence from Ottoman Rule in the 1920s due to its close geographical and historical connection to Damascus.

== Maps ==
- BCE
New Kingdom at its maximum territorial extent in the 15th century BCE

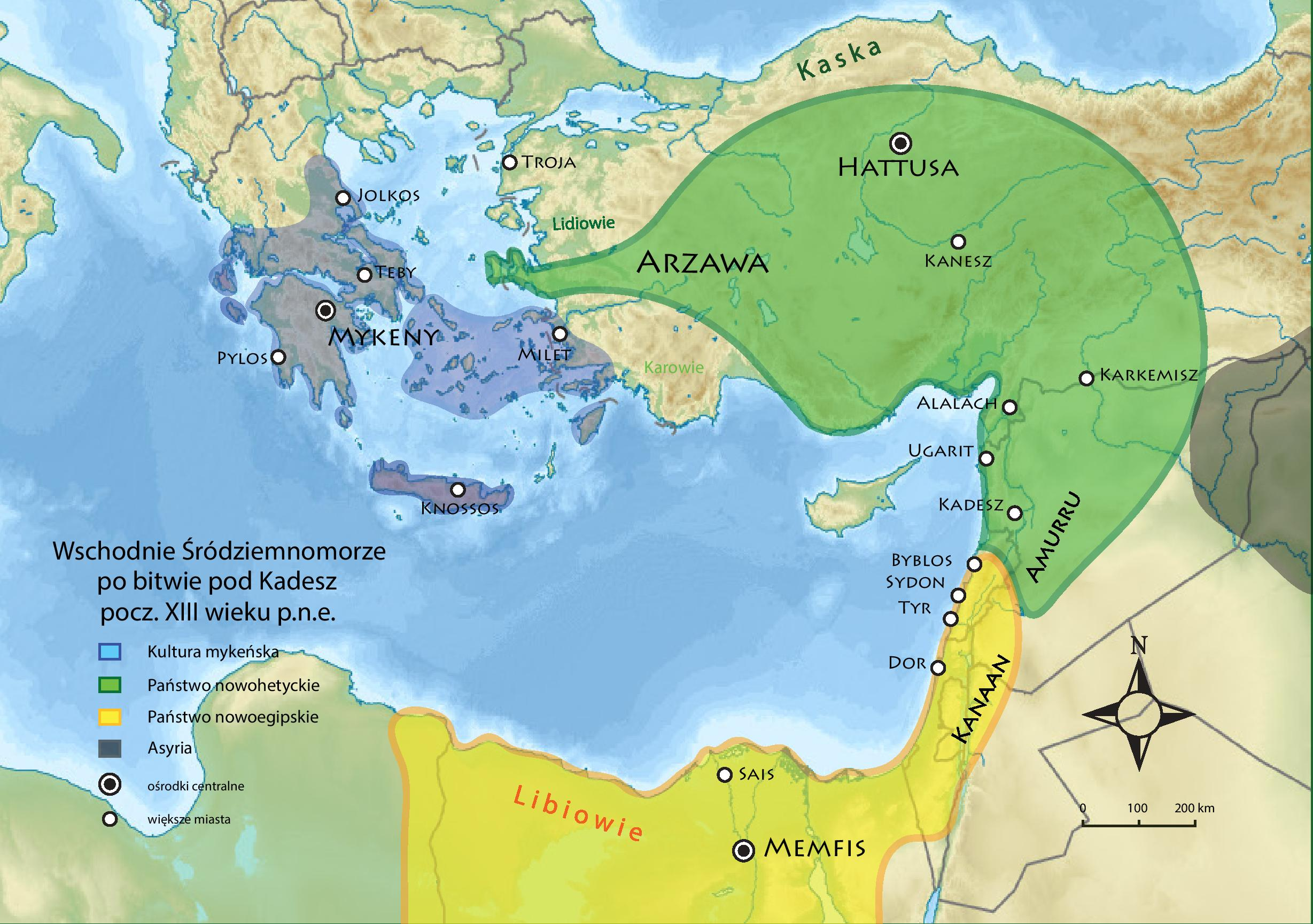

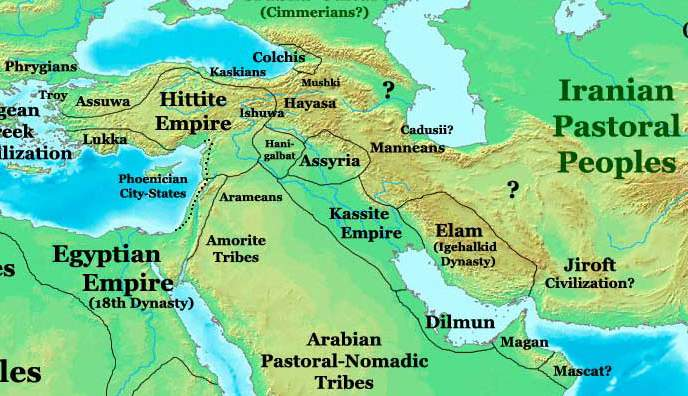
Near East 1300 BCE

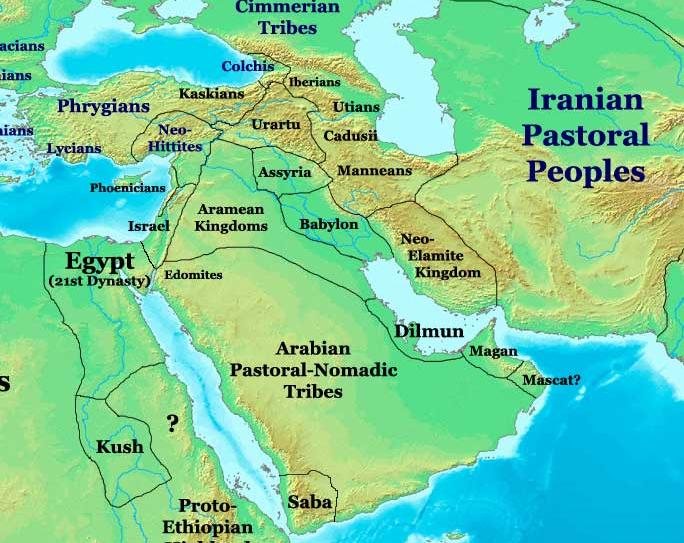
Near East 1000 BCE

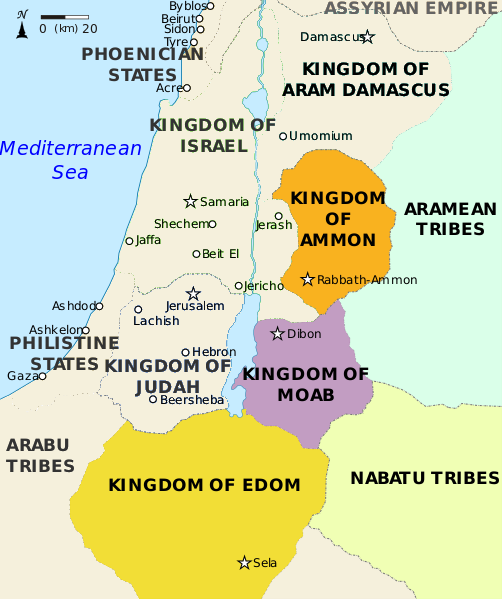
Transjordan Kingdoms of Ammon, Edom and Moab during the Iron Age 830 BCE

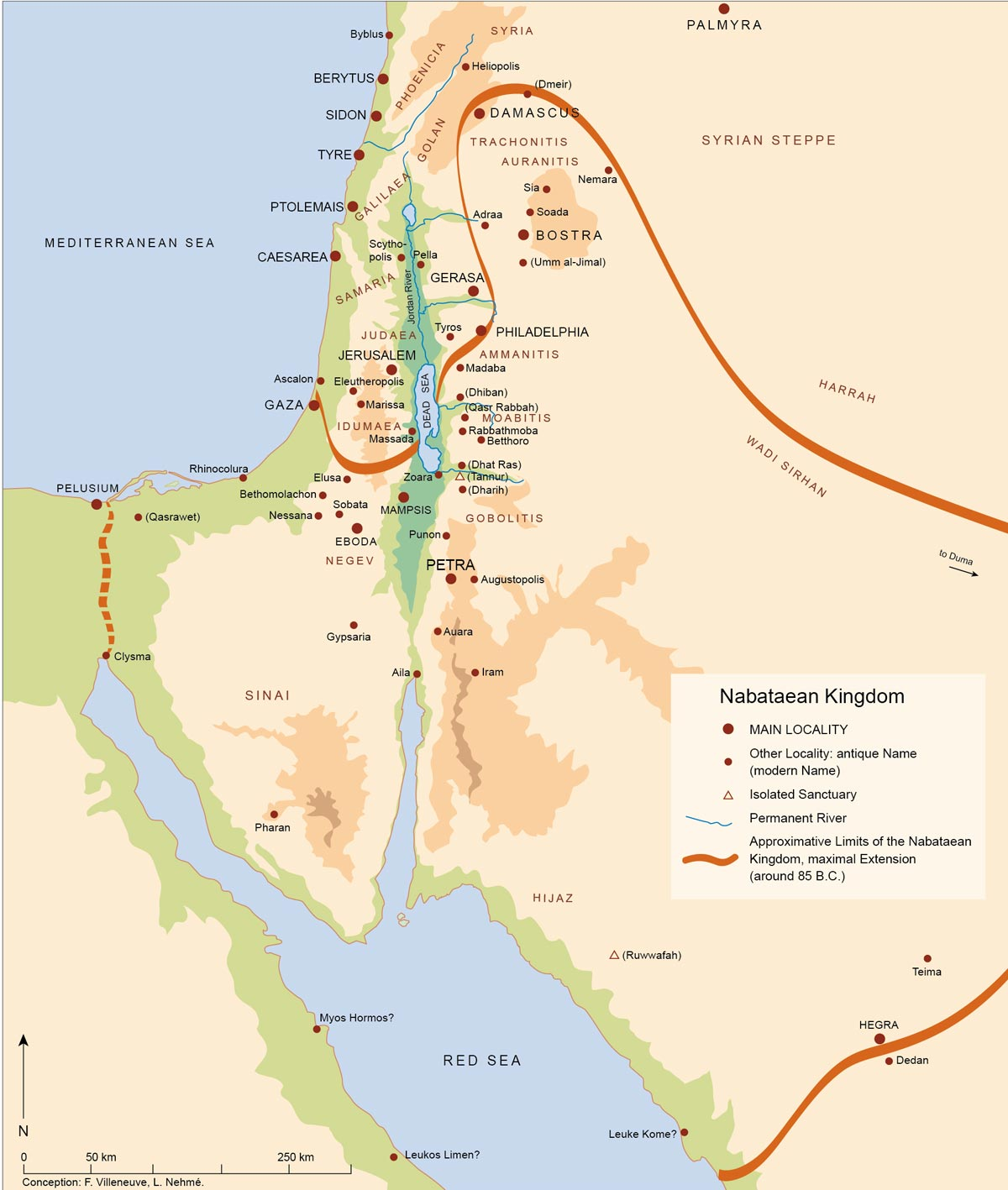
Nabataean Kingdom

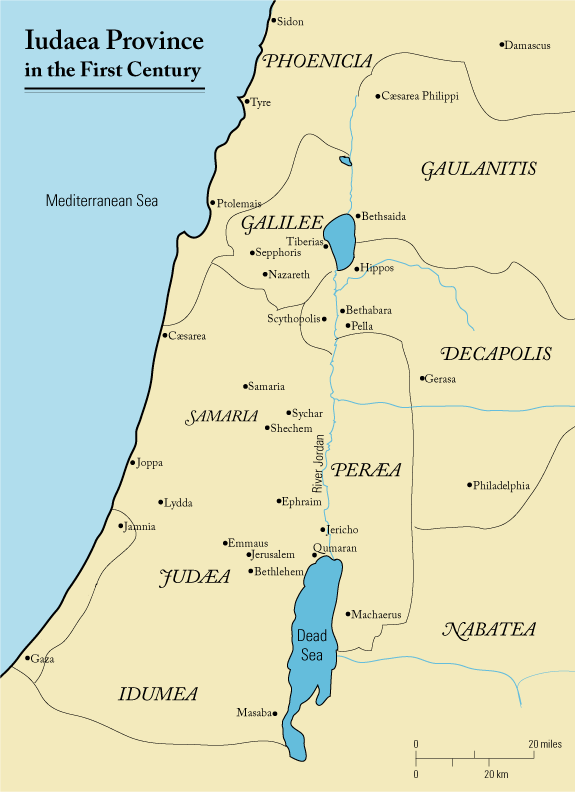
The Province of Judea in the 1st Century CE

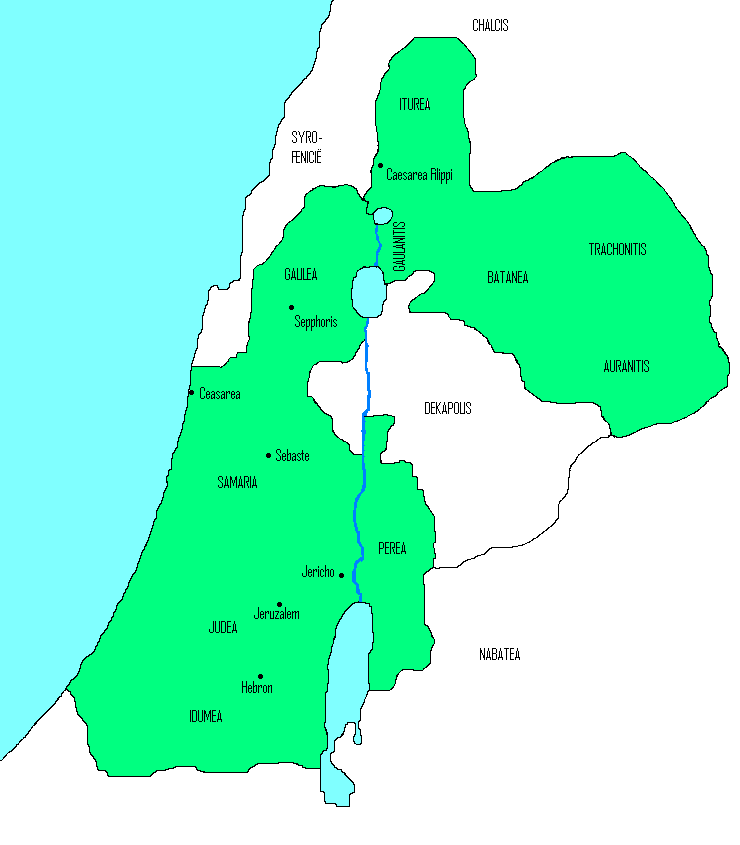
- CE
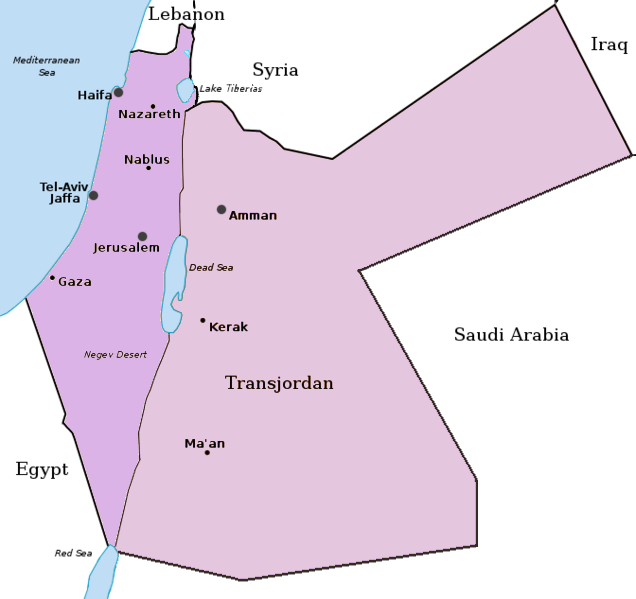
The British Mandate for Palestine. The Emirate of Transjordan is shown in brown.

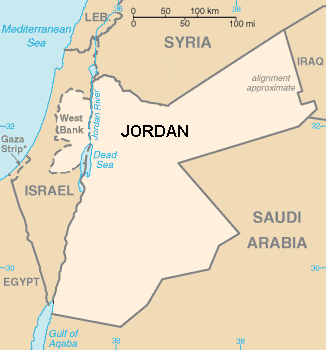
Jordan, 1948–1967. The East Bank is the portion east of the Jordan River, the West Bank is the part west of the river

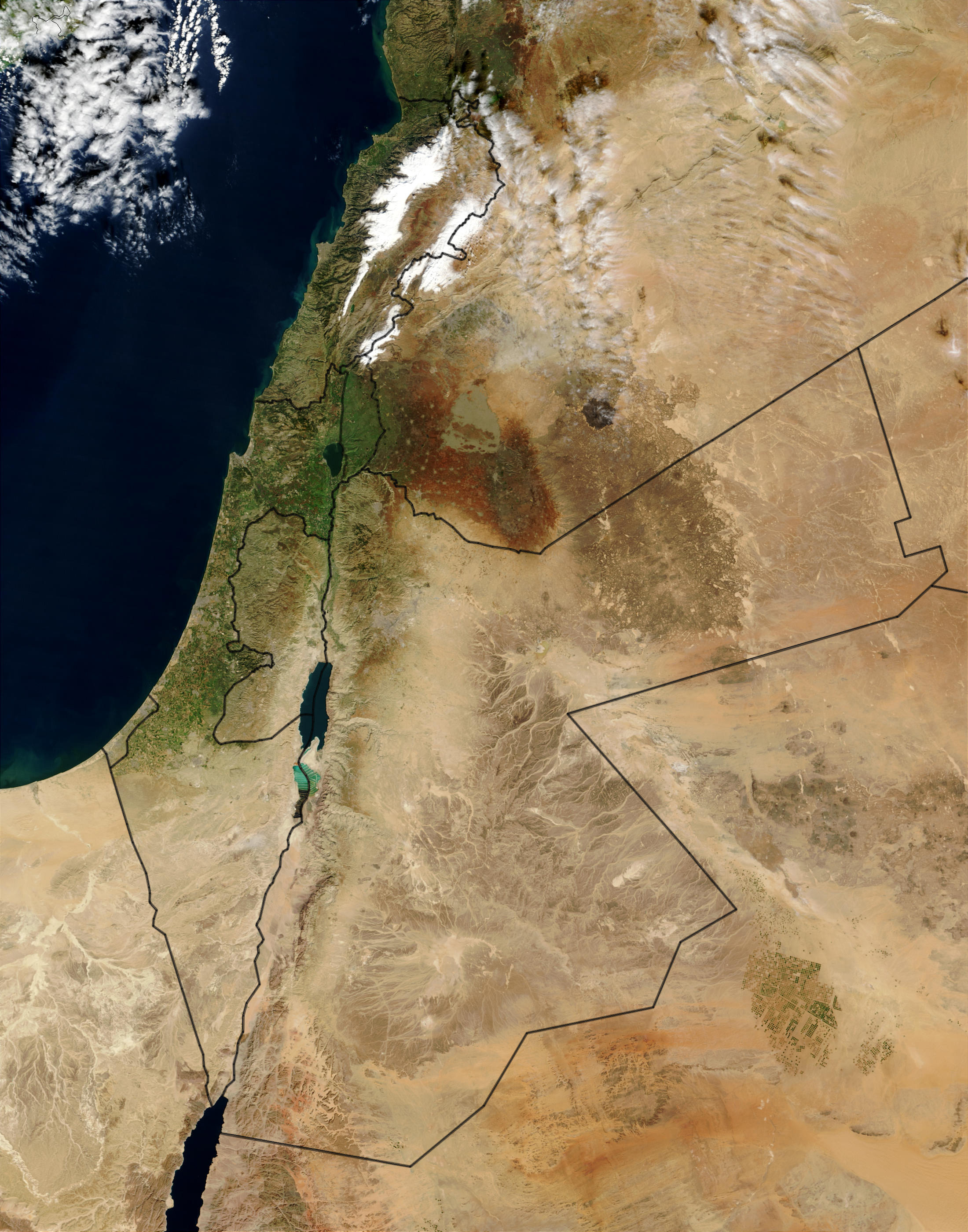
Countries pictured are (clockwise from top right) Syria, Iraq, Saudi Arabia, Egypt (across the Gulf of Aqaba), Israel, the occupied West Bank Territory, and Lebanon. In the center is Jordan.
- Trade routes
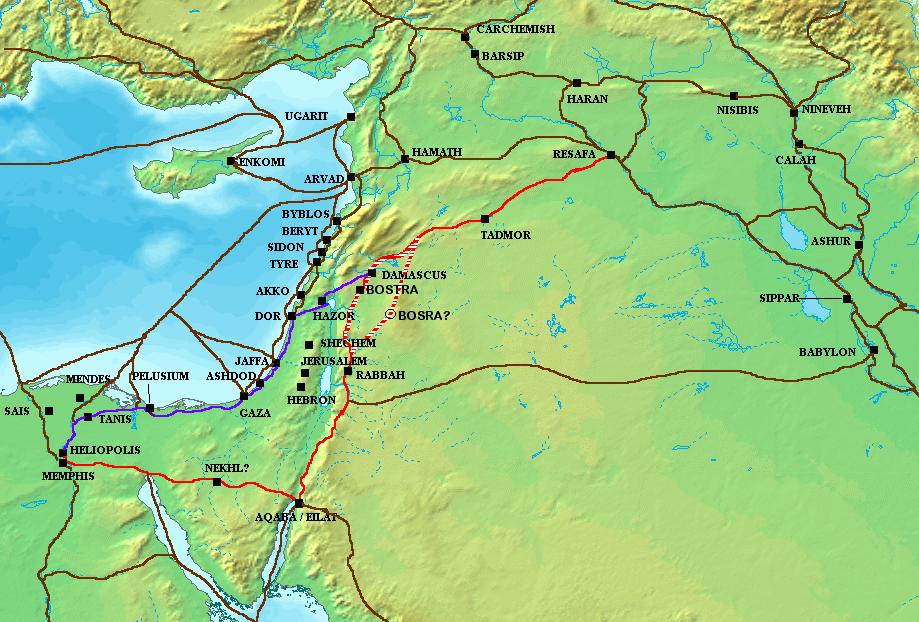
Levantine trade routes 1300 BCE

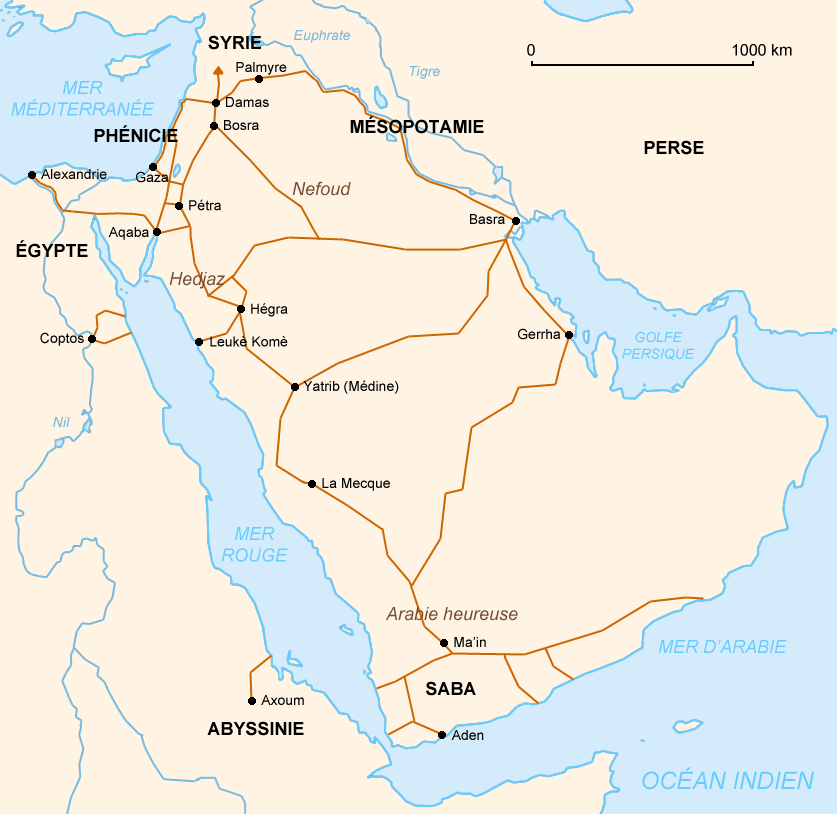

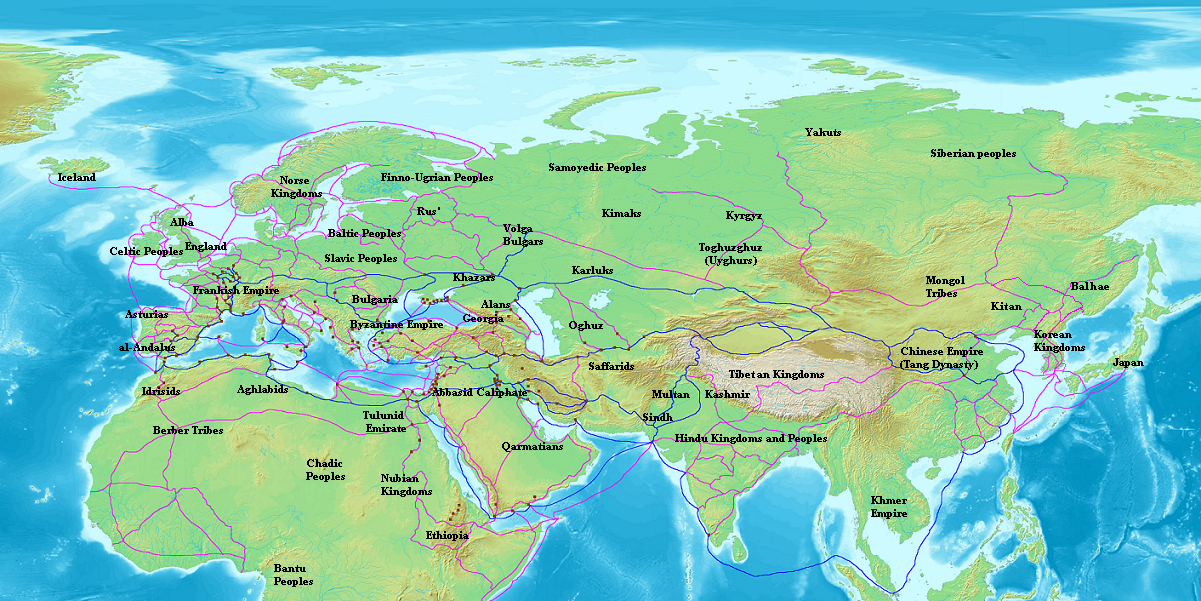
- Egyptian Empire
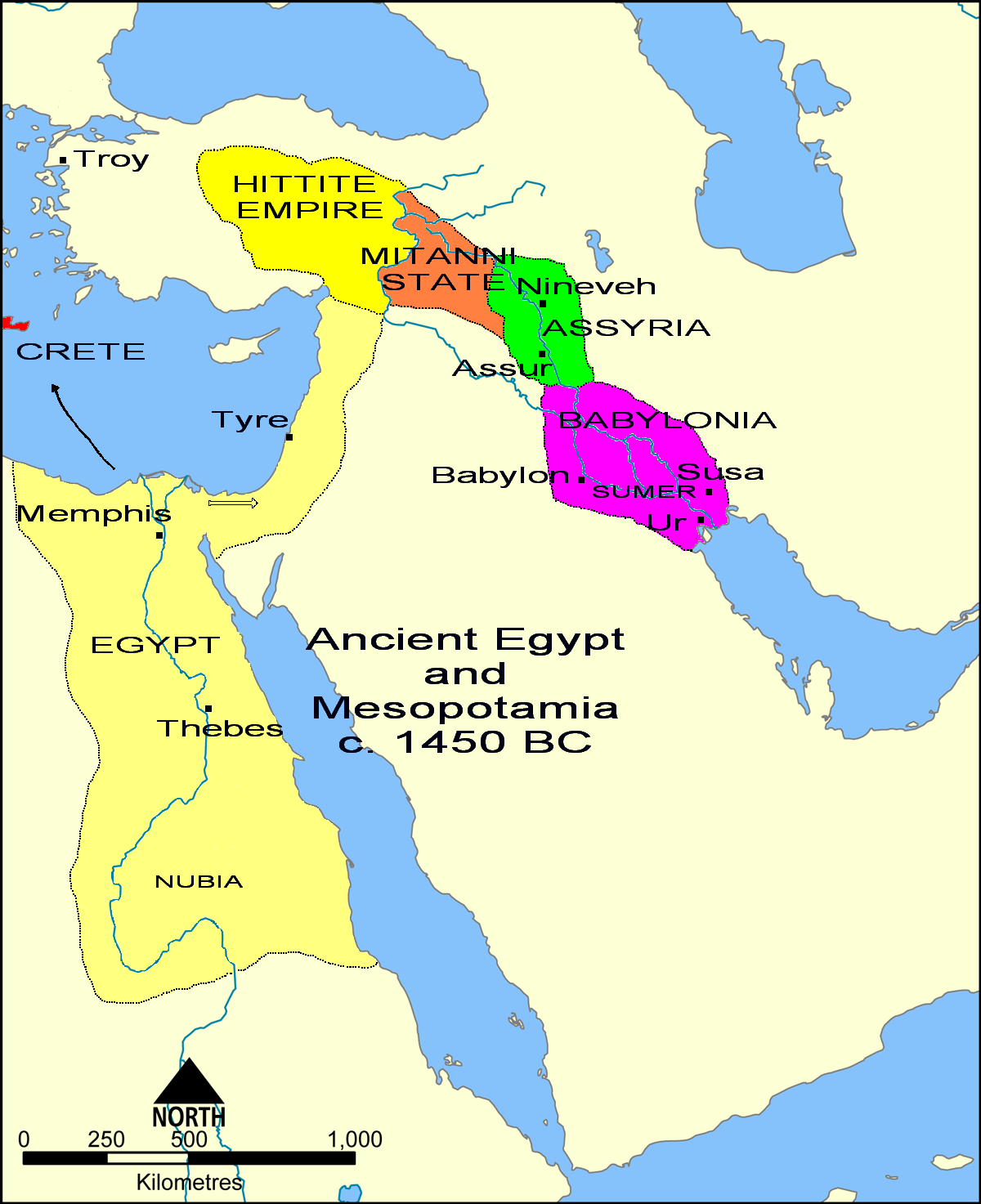

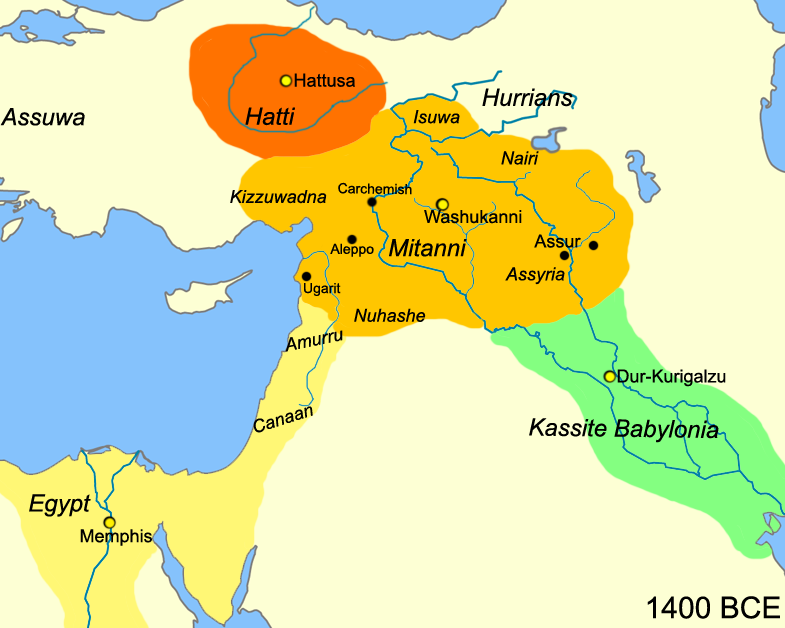

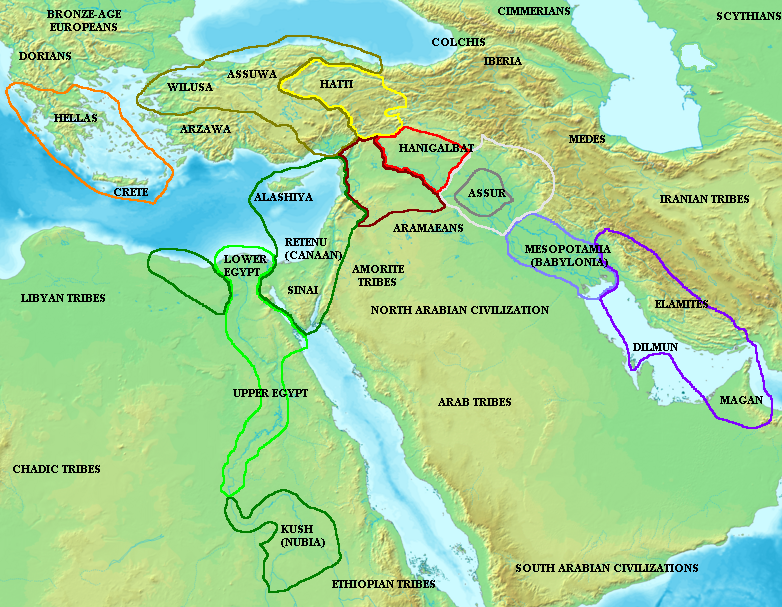
The Hanigalbat (Mitanni) and Egypt.

Map of the Ancient Near East during the Amarna Period.

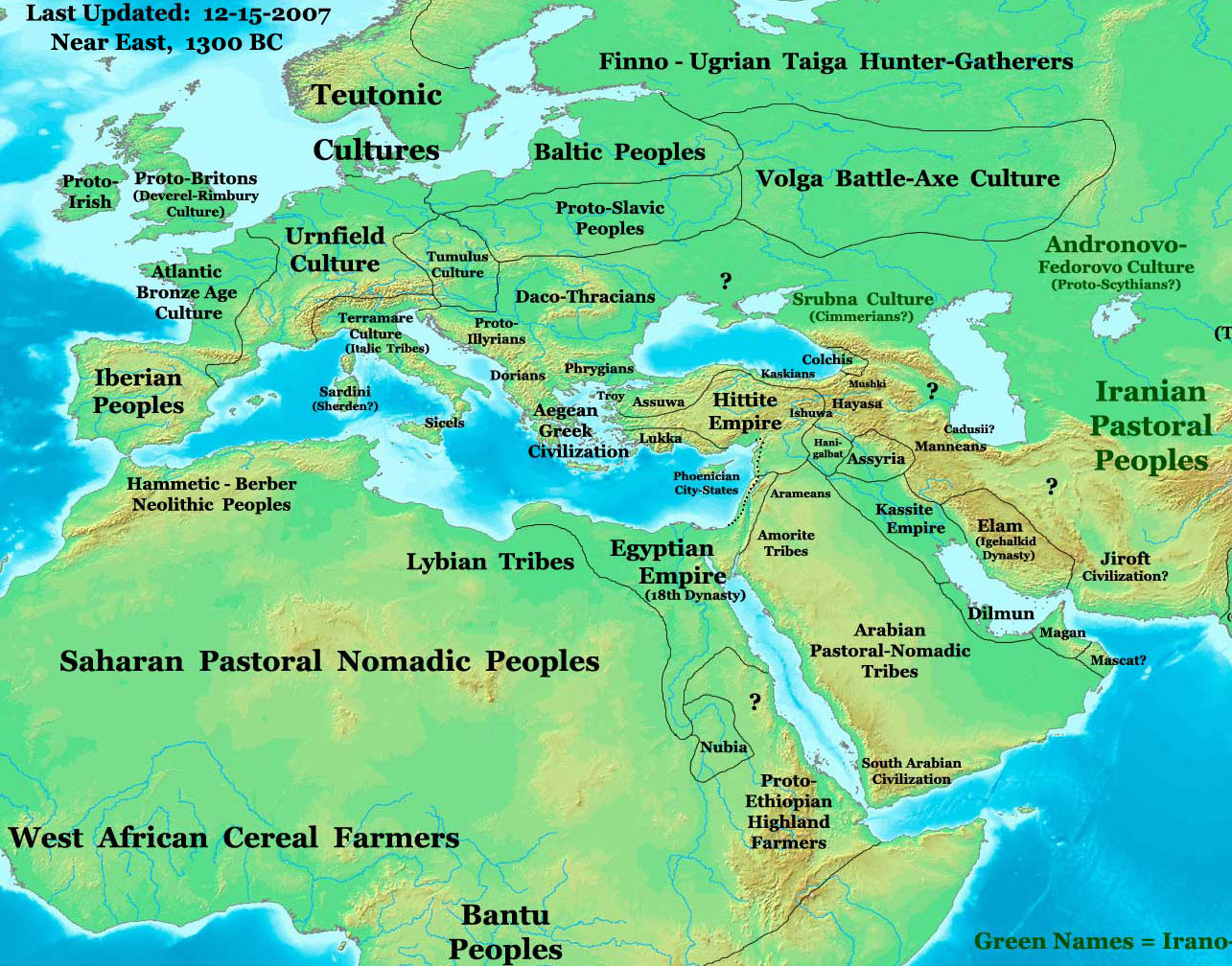

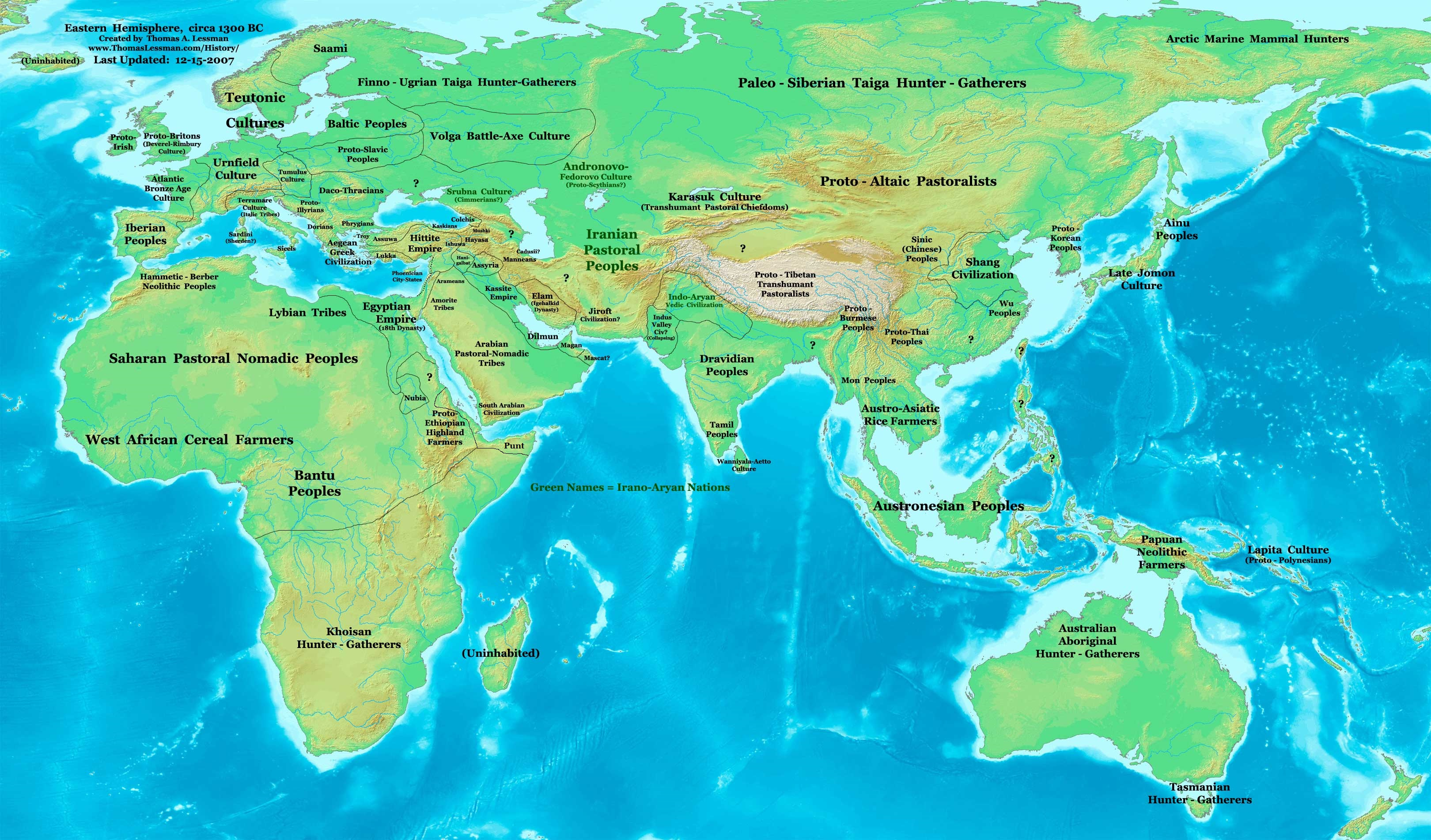

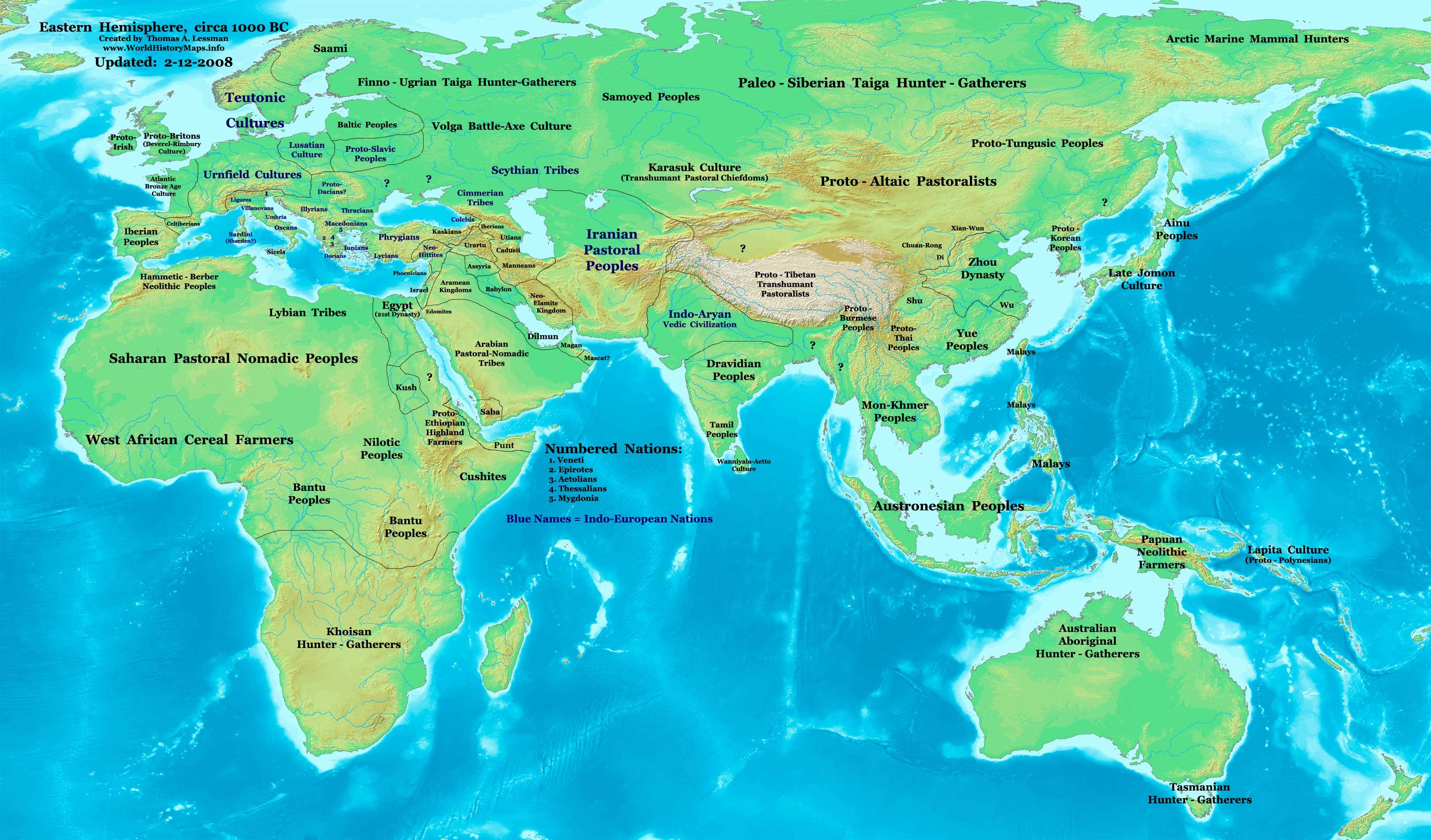
- Transjordan Kingdoms 830 BCE

Transjordan Kingdoms during the Iron Age 830 BCE

- Persian period and Diadochi period
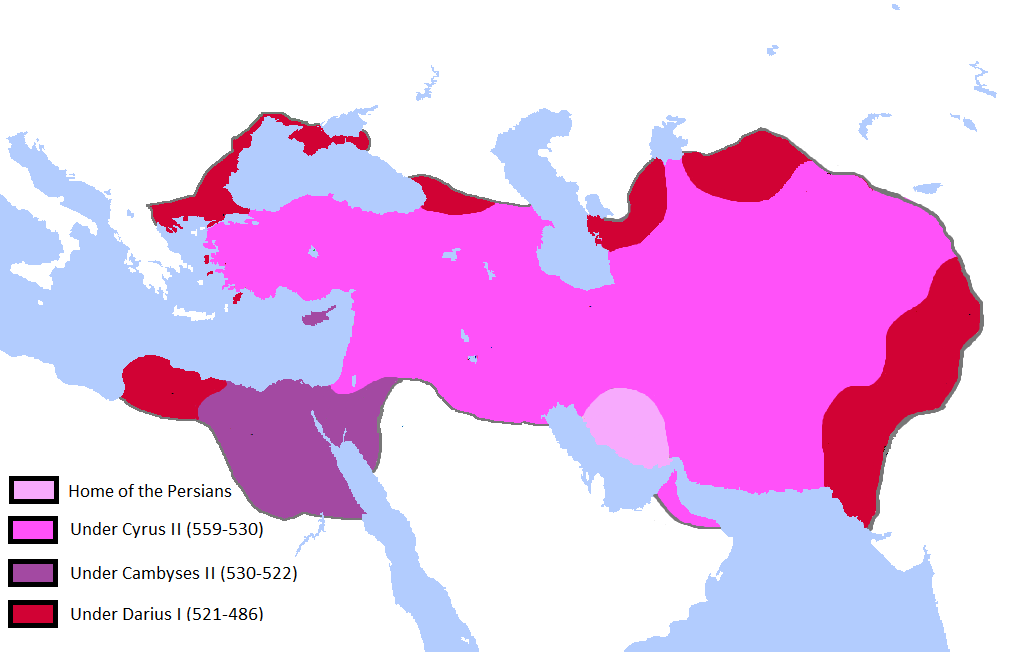

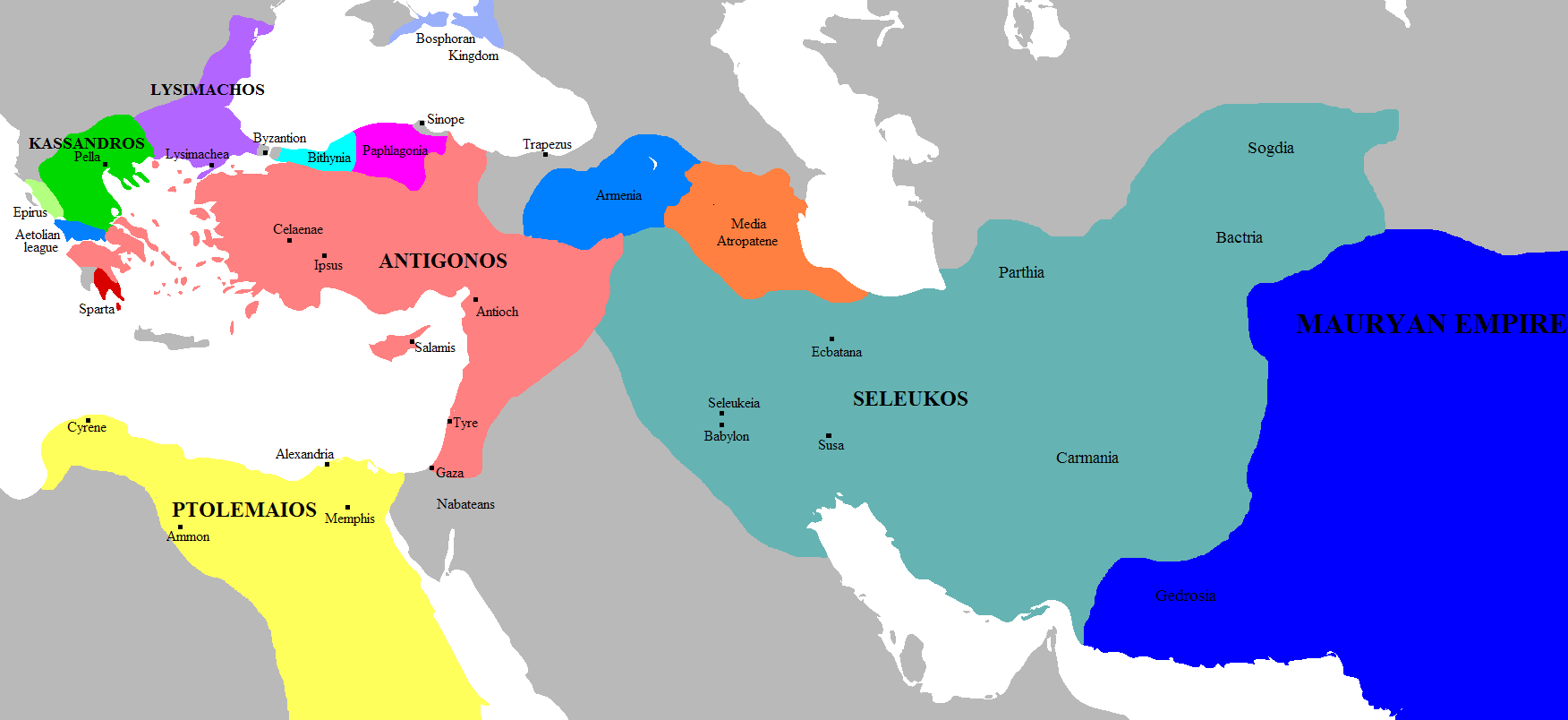

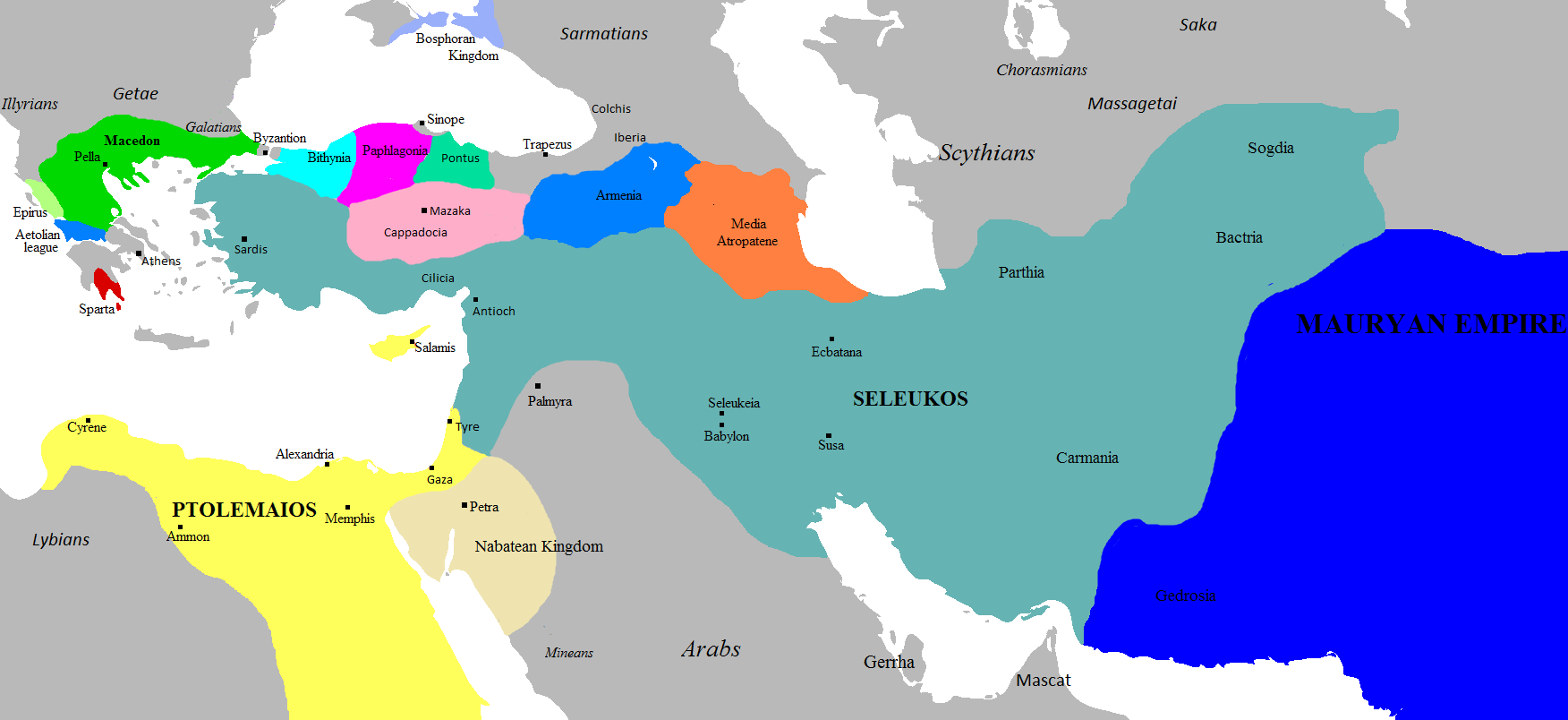
- Hellenistic period
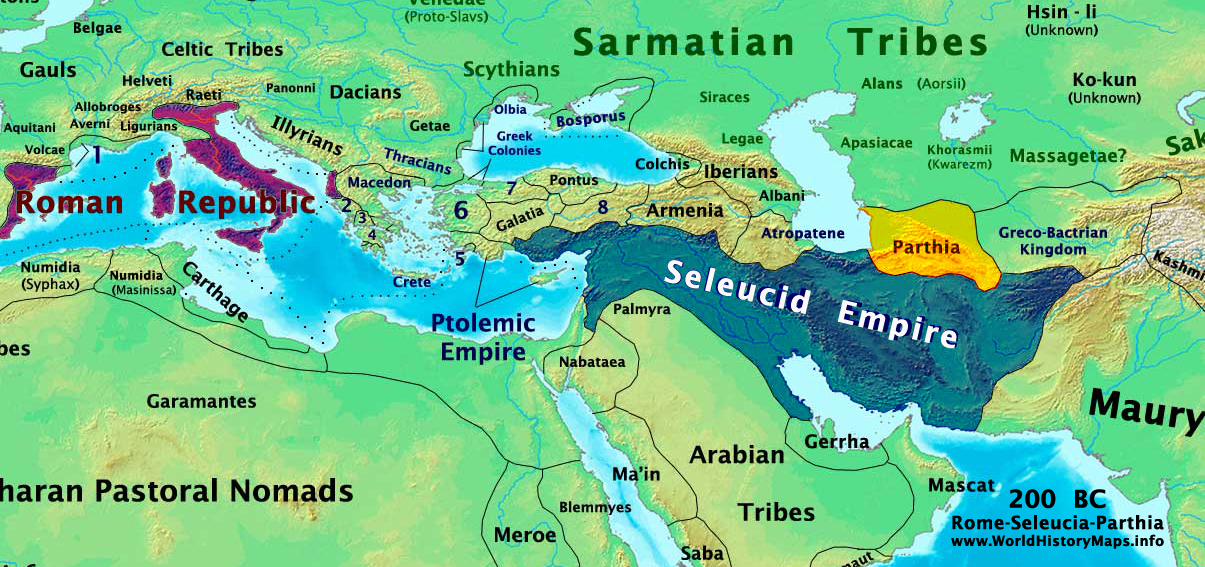

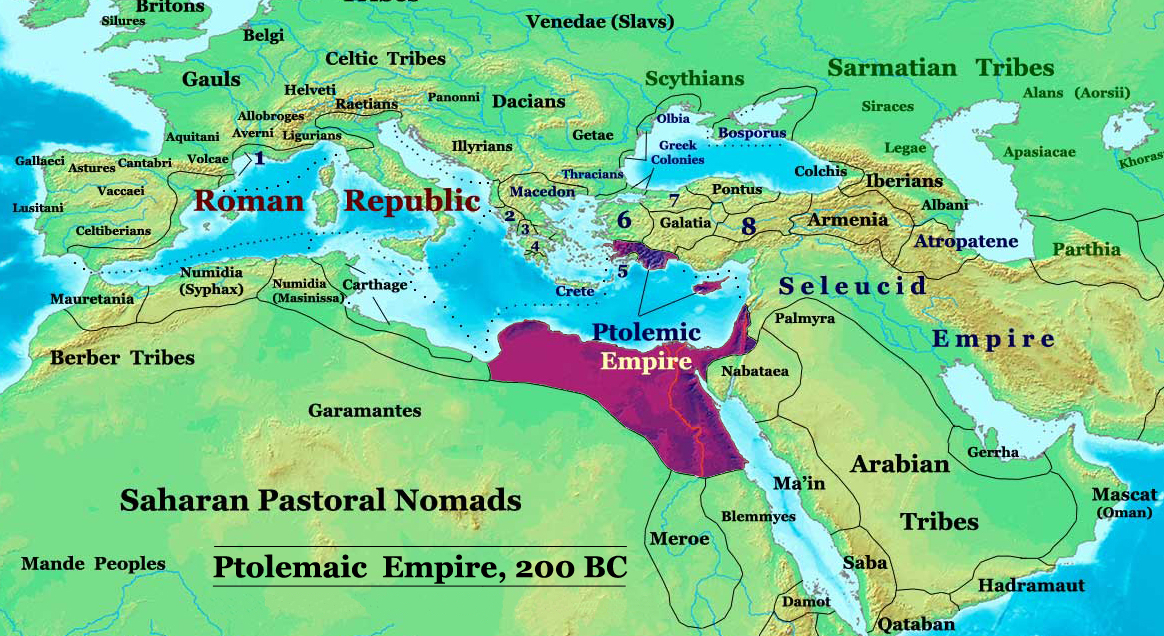

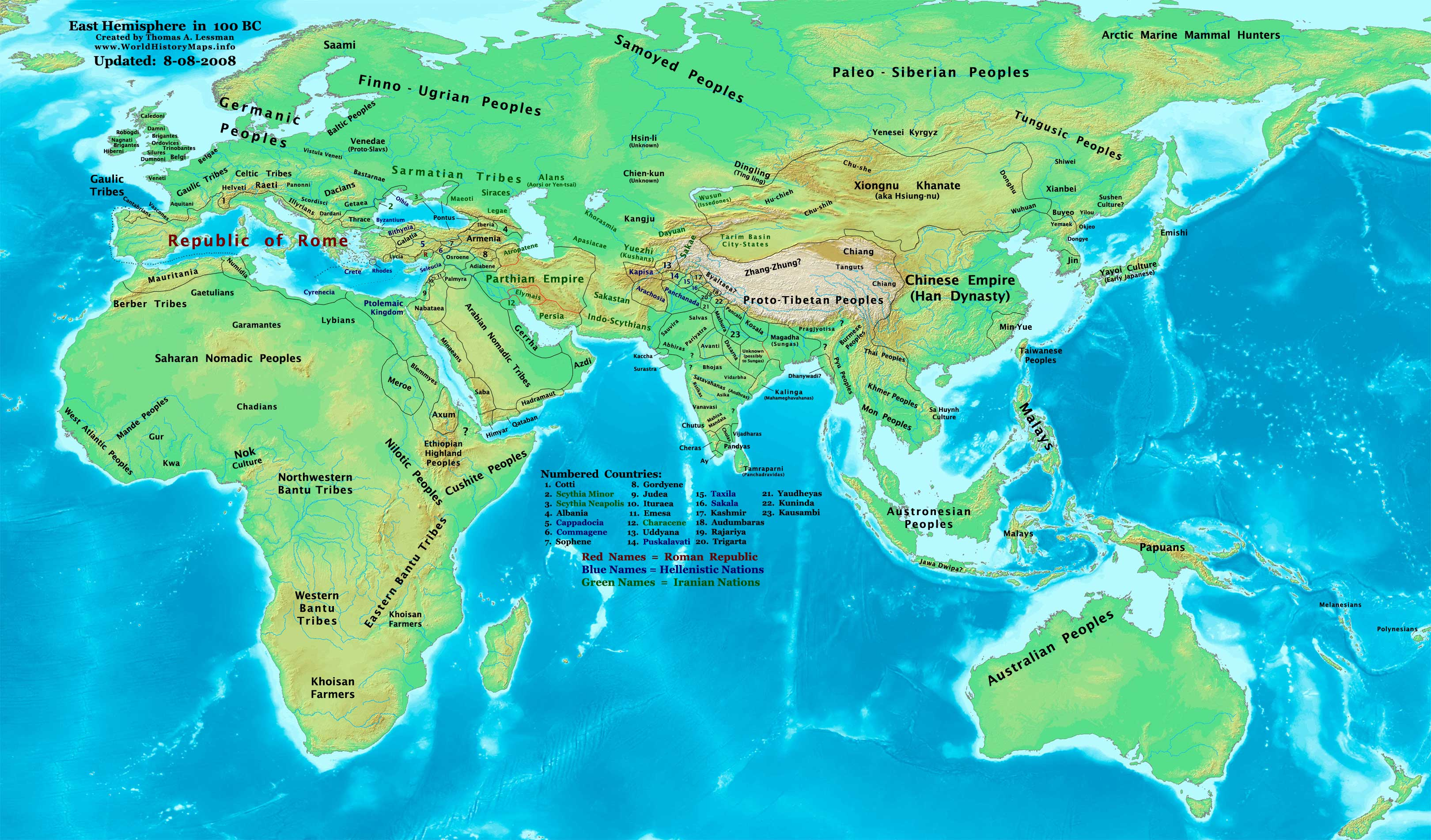
- Roman Orient

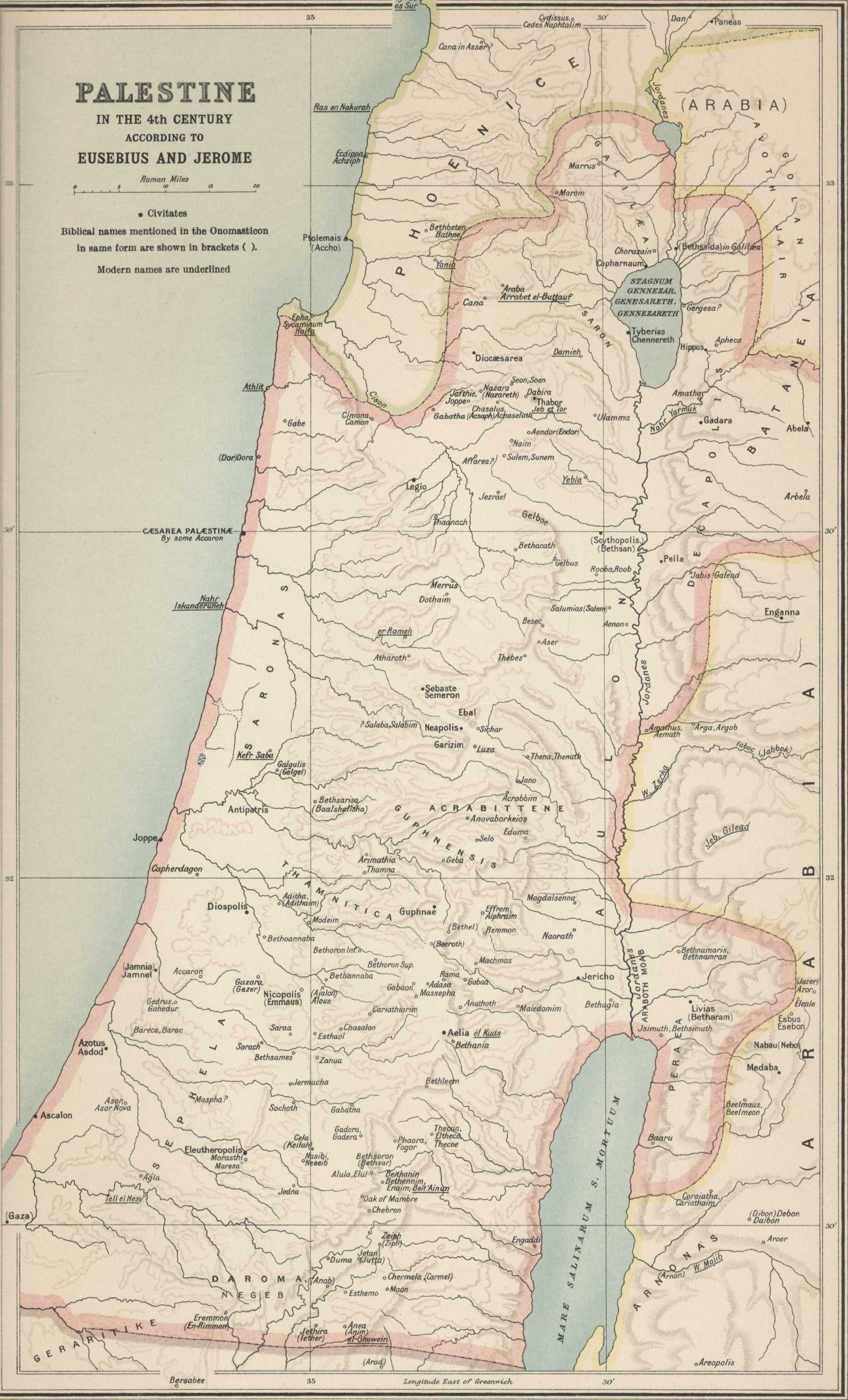

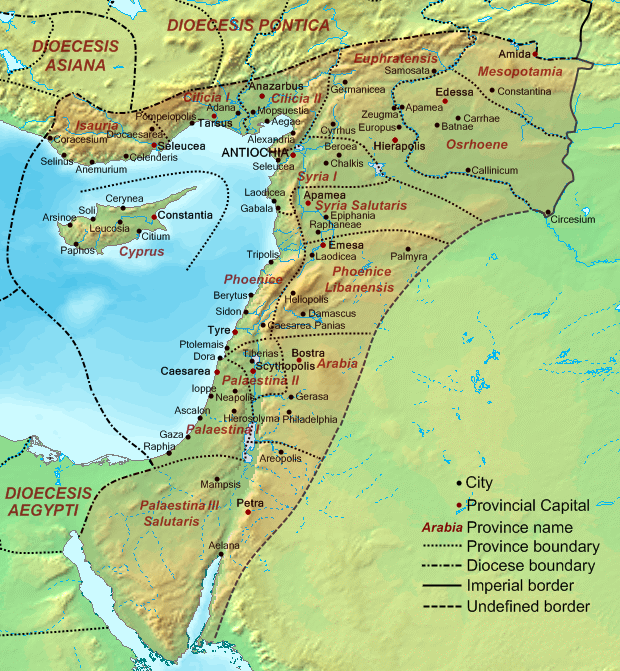

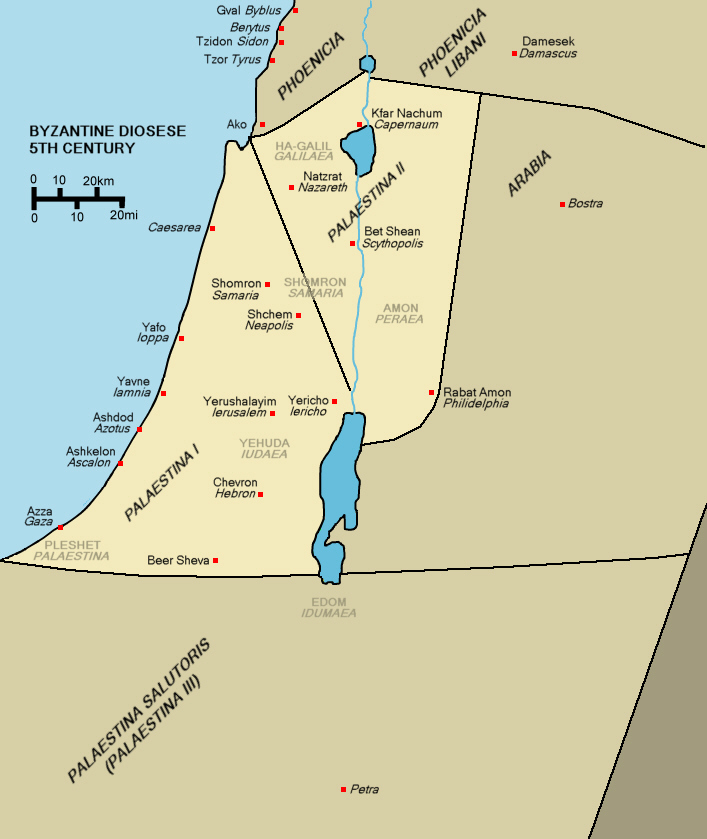
- Roman Empire
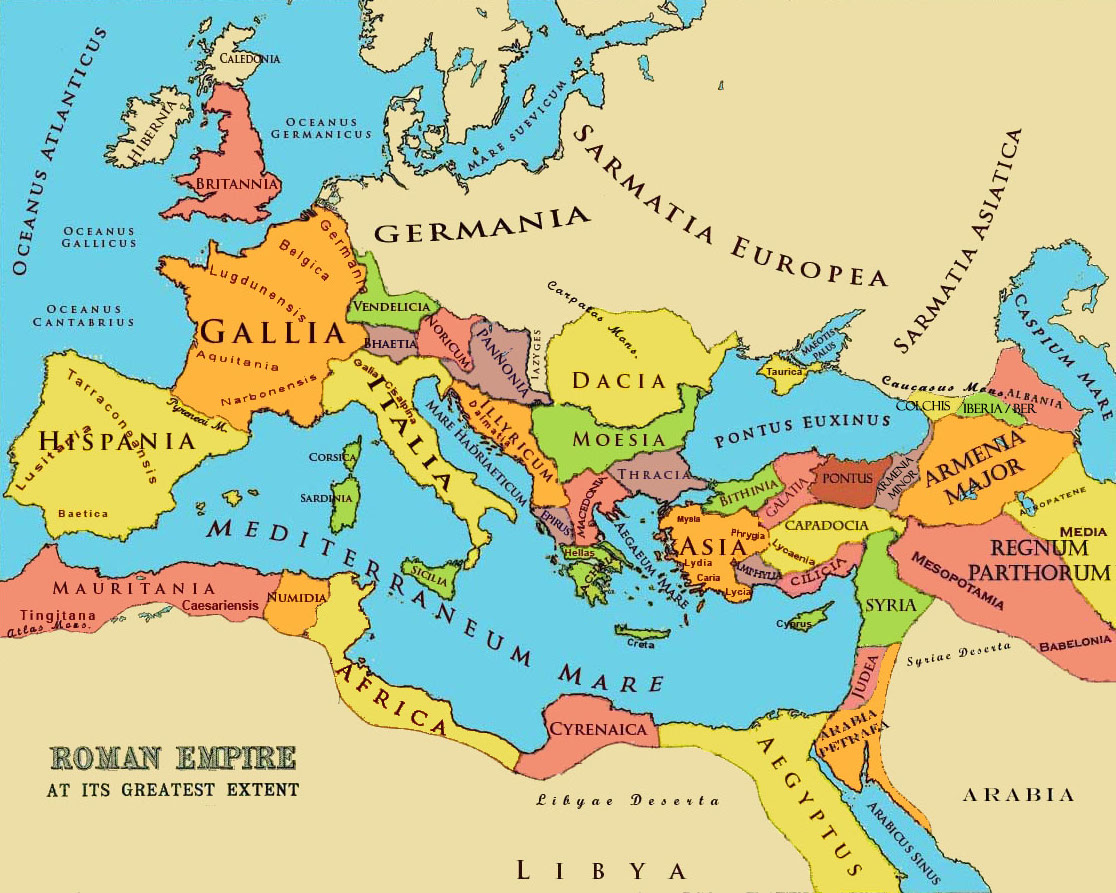

Network of primary Roman roads in the reign of Hadrian

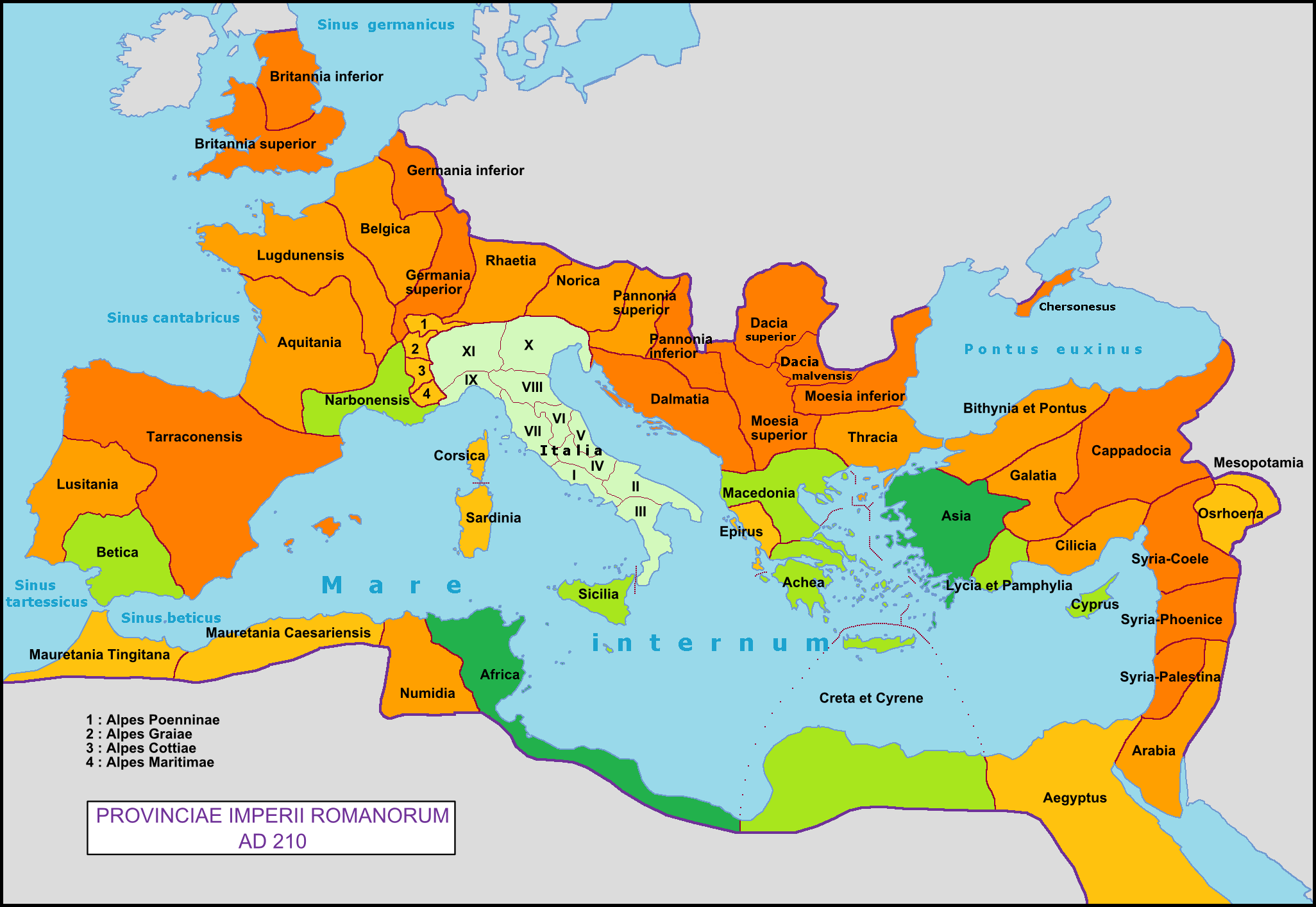

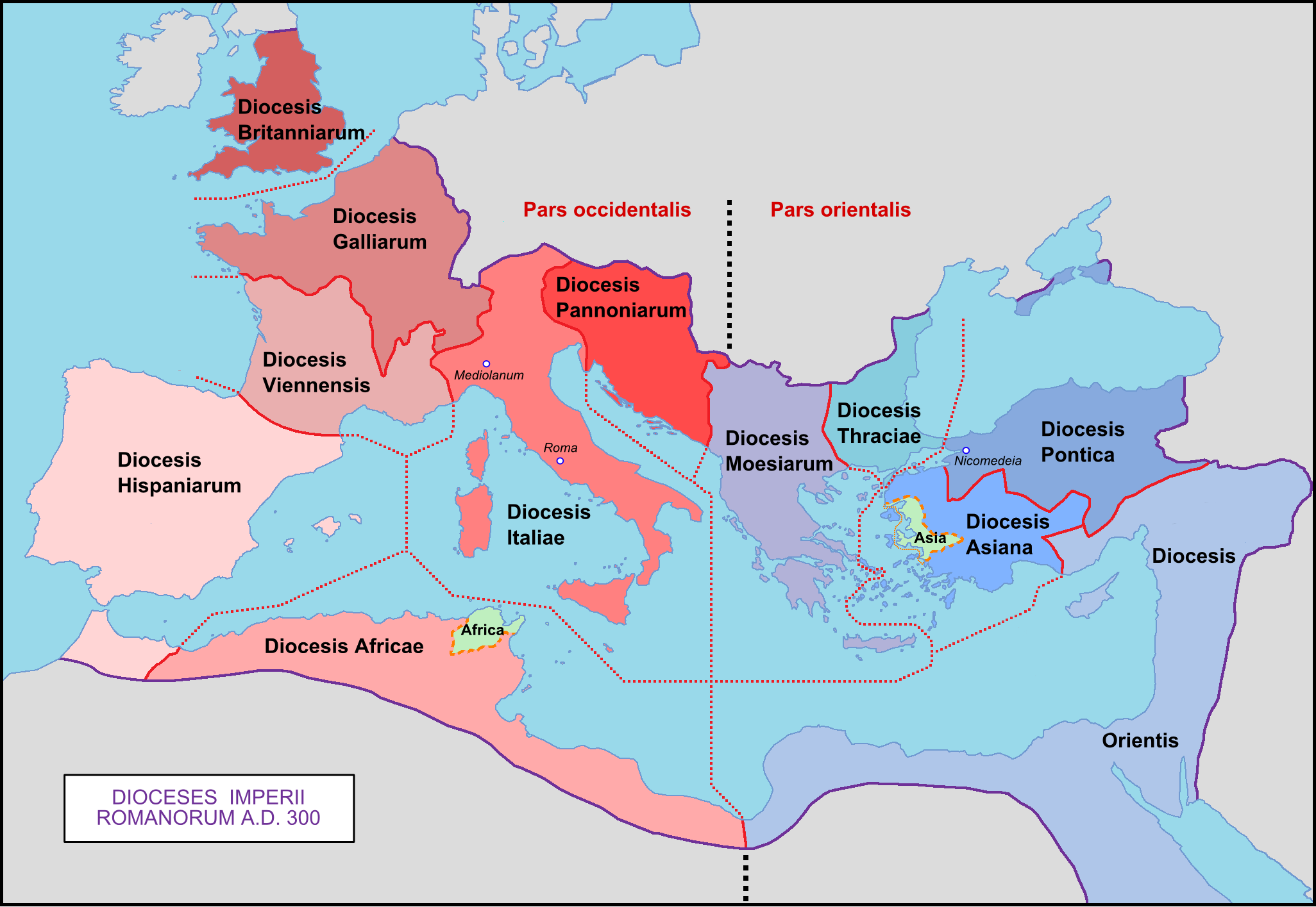

== See also ==
- The East Bank of the Jordan
- Emirate of Transjordan
- Geography of Jordan
- Gilead
- Lordship of Transjordan
- Perea
- Transjordan in the Bible, an area of land in the Southern Levant lying east of the Jordan River that is mentioned in the Hebrew Bible
- Transjordan memorandum
