= Norman K. Gottwald =

American Marxist, political activist, and Old Testament scholar (1926–2022)

Norman Karol Gottwald (October 27, 1926 – March 11, 2022) was a 20th-century American Marxist, political activist, and Old Testament scholar who pioneered the use of social theory and method in biblical studies.

== Education ==
Gottwald received an A.B. and Th.B. from Eastern Baptist Theological Seminary (1949), an M.Div. from Union Theological Seminary (1951), and a doctorate in biblical literature from Columbia University (1953).

== Academic career ==
Gottwald taught at several renowned institutions over the course of his career, including Columbia University (1953-1955), the Andover Newton Theological School (1955-1965) and the Berkeley Baptist Divinity School (later American Baptist Seminary of the West) from 1965 to 1973. From 1966 to 1982, he taught at the Graduate Theological Union. From 1980 to 1994, he taught at the New York Theological Seminary.

He also served as adjunct professor at the Pacific School of Religion in San Francisco.

"Gottwald's greatest contribution to biblical scholarship is his use of anthropology and sociology in biblical studies."

Gottwald was an ordained minister of American Baptist Churches USA and as such "...a strong advocate of popular biblical study committed to social change."

== Fellowships, grants, honors, awards ==
- 1960: Faculty Research Scholarship from the American Association of Theological Schools
- 1960: Fulbright Research Scholarship at Hebrew University (Jerusalem)
- 1968: Post-Doctorate Fellowship at Hebrew Union College Biblical and Archaeological School (Jerusalem)
- 1970: Faculty Research Scholarship from the American Association of Theological Schools
- 1996: Honorary Doctorate from the University of Sheffield

== Students ==
- Claude Mariottini, professor of Old Testament, Northern Baptist Seminary
- Eun Suk Cho, Pastor of Golden Gate Presbyterian Church, Daly City, California

== Personal life ==
Gottwald was born on October 27, 1926, in Chicago to Norman Karl and Carol (Copeland) Gottwald.

Gottwald married Laura; they had two children.

In 1953, Gottwald wrote a letter to Life magazine in response to the essay "Is Academic Freedom in Danger?" by Whittaker Chambers, stating:

Sirs:

Mr. Chambers' article is timely and soberly written. We must all be thanks for his contribution. But with all their grim necessity, such investigations arouse and feed upon suspicion and mistrust; they inflame passion and prejudice. A little more "liberal neurosis" in Germany might have checked Nazism at its inception. The liberal must warn that in the struggle for survival we may sell our soul.

Certainly, we must uncover and prosecute those who intend the violent overthrow of our government. But we must resist with all our strength the self-righteousness and assumed importance, the political opportunism of those who would have us believe these skirmishes constitute the real war against Communism. The "liberal neurosis" is trying to lift the vision of shortsighted men who have little or no understanding of the conflict of ideas, of why men become Communists, why they are disillusioned, and how we may enlist these factors in the cause of freedom.

Norman K. Gottwald
New York, NY

Gottwald's was the final letter published by the magazine and seemed to make the most effort to resolve conflicting views in the foregoing letters. Gottwald died March 11, 2022 .

== Works ==
Gottwald's most influential work is The Tribes of Yahweh: A Sociology of the Religion of Liberated Israel, 1250-1050 B.C.E. (1979). In it, he employed a sociological approach to the study of early Israelite religion and politics. He proposed Israelites emerged as local Canaanite peasants sought to overthrow the corrupt regimes they lived in. Their action was fueled by a liberating faith in the deity Yahweh. They dislocated to the previously unsettled Judean hills in order to form a more equal community. These ideals are reflected in the legendary stories of the Pentateuch, Joshua and Judges.

=== Authored books ===
- Studies in the Book of Lamentations. Studies in Biblical Theology 14. London: SCM, 1954. OCLC 925389 Reprinted, Eugene, OR: Wipf & Stock, 2010. OCLC 503307711 (orig. PhD Thesis, Columbia University, 1953)
- A Light to the Nations: An Introduction to the Old Testament. New York: Harper, 1959. Reprinted, Eugene, OR: Wipf & Stock, 2009. OCLC 361062
- All the Kingdoms of the Earth: Israelite Prophecy and International Relations in the Ancient Near East. New York: Harper & Row, 1964. OCLC 373937 Reprinted, Minneapolis: Fortress, 2007. OCLC 838050718
- The Church Unbound: A Human Church in a Human World. Philadelphia: Lippincott, 1967. OCLC 1318974
- The Tribes of Yahweh: A Sociology of the Religion of Liberated Israel, 1250-1050 B.C.E.. Maryknoll, NY: Orbis, 1979.OCLC 4503604
- The Hebrew Bible: A Socio-literary Introduction. Philadelphia: Fortress, 1985. OCLC 11549097
- The Hebrew Bible in Its Social World and in Ours. SBL Semeia Studies. Atlanta: Scholars, 1993. OCLC 27770883
- with Laura Lagerquist-Gottwald. Pentecost 3. Proclamation 6: Interpreting the Lessons of the Church Year. Series B. Minneapolis: Fortress, 1996. OCLC 36176433
- The Tribes of Yahweh: A Sociology of the Religion of Liberated Israel, 1250-1050 B.C.E.. Reprinted, with a new Preface. Biblical Seminar 66. Sheffield: Sheffield Academic, 1999. OCLC 893336470
- The Politics of Ancient Israel. Library of Ancient Israel. Louisville: Westminster John Knox, 2001. OCLC 44469096
- The Hebrew Bible: A Brief Socio-literary Introduction. Philadelphia: Fortress, 2008. OCLC 247441256
- Social Justice and the Hebrew Bible. Vol. 1. Center and Library for the Bible and Social Justice Series. Eugene, OR: Cascade Books, 2016.
- Social Justice and the Hebrew Bible. Vol. 2. Center and Library for the Bible and Social Justice Series. Eugene, OR: Cascade Books, 2016.
- Social Justice and the Hebrew Bible. Vol. 3. Center and Library for the Bible and Social Justice Series. Eugene, OR: Cascade Books, 2018.

=== Edited books ===
- Gottwald, Norman K., ed. The Bible and Liberation: Political and Social Hermeneutics. Maryknoll, NY: Orbis, 1983. OCLC 8954335
- Gottwald, Norman K., and Richard A. Horsley, eds. The Bible and Liberation: Political and Social Hermeneutics. Rev. ed. Bible and Liberation Series. Maryknoll, NY: Orbis, 1993. OCLC 27895938
- Coote, Robert B., and Norman K. Gottwald, eds. To Break Every Yoke: Essays in Honor of Marvin L. Chaney. Social World of Biblical Antiquity, 2nd ser., 3. Sheffield: Sheffield Phoenix, 2007. OCLC 228497046

=== Festschriften ===
- Jobling, David, Peggy L. Day, and Gerald T. Sheppard, eds. The Bible and the Politics of Exegesis: Essays in Honor of Norman K. Gottwald on His Sixty-fifth Birthday. Cleveland: Pilgrim, 1991. OCLC 24174005
- Boer, Roland, ed. Tracking the Tribes of Yahweh: On the Trail of a Classic. Journal for the Study of the Old Testament Supplements 351. London: Sheffield Academic, 2002. OCLC 27895938

== See also ==
- George E. Mendenhall
