= Witness (altar) =

Witness is the name of an altar referred to in Joshua 22:10–34. Its name appears as "Witness" in the New King James Version, the English Standard Version and the New Living Translation. The Geneva Bible and the King James Version transliterate the original Hebrew word Ed (עד ‘êḏ), while the New International Version regards all of the following words as the name of the altar: "A Witness Between Us that the LORD is God". The New Century Version recalls the altar's name as "Proof That We Believe the Lord Is God". The New American Standard Bible calls it "the Offensive Altar".

According to Joshua 22, the eastern or Transjordanian tribes cross over the Jordan River after having assisted in the conquest of the land of Canaan. They then build a massive altar by the Jordan. This causes the "whole congregation of the Israelites" to prepare for war, but they first send to the Transjordanian tribes a delegation led by Phinehas. They accuse the eastern tribes of making God angry and suggesting that their land may be unclean. In response to this, the Transjordanian tribes say that the altar will not be used for offerings, but is only a "witness". The altar was made as a corporate art sculpture. The western tribes are satisfied, and return home.

The altar's construction concerned the other tribes who felt that there should only be one altar. However the eastern tribes explained that they built it only as a testimony to their unity of religion (despite their being somewhat cut-off by the river), and not as a rival working altar (like the later calves set up by Jereboam). The eastern tribes named the altar "Witness" to fit this.

Assis argues that the unusual dimensions of the altar suggest that it "was not meant for sacrificial use", but was, in fact, "meant to attract the attention of the other tribes" and provoke a reaction. Davis regards the Transjordanians' action as "the first in a series of independent acts on the part of the various tribes which would lead to a later fragmentation of the tribes of Israel," and the construction of the altar as a "departure of God's plan for centralized worship."

== Location ==
The location of the altar has also been disputed. The Jamieson-Fausset-Brown Bible Commentary says:

The generality of our translators supposes that it was reared on the banks of the Jordan, within the limits of Canaan proper. But a little closer examination seems to make the conclusion irresistible that its position was on the eastern side of the river, for these two reasons; first, because it is said (Joshua 22:11) to have been built "over against," or in the sight of the land of Canaan — not within it; and secondly, because the declared motive of the trans-jordanic Israelites in erecting it was to prevent their brethren in Canaan ever saying, in time to come, "What have ye to do with the Lord God of Israel? For the Lord hath made Jordan a border between us and you."

Norman Snaith asserts that it was "at Gilgal, on the west bank of the Jordan", while Assis argues that it was built east of the Jordan.

The name of the altar is not clear in the Masoretic Text, and the text could be corrupted at this point. It reads "The Reubenites and the Gadites named the altar because it is a witness between us that Yahweh is God." Some textual scholars suspect that the name of the altar must have been dropped by a copyist, either deliberately or unintentionally.
