= David Jobling =

David Jobling (born 1941) is a Canadian Old Testament scholar. He was professor of Old Testament language and literature at St. Andrew's College, Saskatoon.

Jobling was a "mediating critic" between the schools of structuralism and the New Criticism in biblical studies. He also combined deconstruction with both liberation theology and feminist theology. Norman K. Gottwald notes that Jobling "has been a leader of literary analysis of the Hebrew Bible", and has "made a great impact in his use of ideological criticism and his engagement with feminist criticism."

Jobling wrote two volumes of The Sense of Biblical Narrative: Structural Analyses in the Hebrew Bible (1978 and 1986). He also wrote a commentary on 1 Samuel in the Berit Olam series (1998). He was President of the Canadian Society of Biblical Studies in 1992–93.

In 2006, a Festschrift was published in his honor. Voyages in Uncharted Waters: Essays on the Theory and Practice of Biblical Interpretation in Honor of David Jobling included contributions from Norman K. Gottwald, David M. Gunn, and Norman Habel.
