= Moshe Weinfeld =

Israeli Bible scholar (1925–2009)

- משה ויינפלד
- Born: 27 August 1925; Nowy Sącz, Poland
- Died: 29 April 2009 (aged 83)
- Occupations: Biblical scholar, professor
- Awards: Ben-Zvi Prize (1993); Israel Prize for Bible (1994)

Academic background
- Education: Hebrew University of Jerusalem

Moshe Weinfeld (also Weinfield, Hebrew: משה ויינפלד; August 27, 1925 – April 29, 2009) was a professor of Bible at the Hebrew University of Jerusalem. In 1994, he won the Israel Prize for Bible.

== Biography ==
Moshe Weinfeld was born in Nowy Sącz, Poland. In 1965, Weinfeld earned a PhD at the Hebrew University of Jerusalem. Prior to his emigration to Palestine in 1947, he survived the Nazi Holocaust—90% of the Jews in the village where he was born died after it was taken in September 1939 and over the course of what followed in the ghettoes and camps amidst the Disaster.

Weinfeld went on to become one of the leading scholars of his generation in historical inquiry and investigations of the source of the origins of the Torah and in particular of the Book of Deuteronomy (which he, like other scholars, held to be one of the most ancient sections of the laws and teachings). In 1969, he was appointed senior lecturer in Hebrew University's Bible department. In 1973, Weinfeld became associate professor, and was promoted to full professor in 1978.

Weinfeld taught at the Jewish Theological Seminary of America (1967–1969); Brandeis University (1968); University of California, San Diego (1981); University of California, Berkeley (1989).

== Awards and recognition ==
- In 1993, Weinfeld was awarded the Ben-Zvi Prize for the History of Palestine for his Hebrew book From Joshua to Josiah: Turning Points in the History of Israel From the Conquest of the Land Until the Fall of Judah, Jerusalem: Magnes Press (1992).
- In 1994, he was awarded the Israel Prize, for Bible.

== Published works ==
- Deuteronomy and the Deuteronomic School, Oxford: Clarendon (1972)
- ‘Justice and Righteousness’ in Ancient Israel against the Background of Social Reforms in the Ancient Near East (Report No. 4/79), Jerusalem: Institute for Advanced Studies of the Hebrew University (1979)
- Getting at the Roots of Wellhausen’s Understanding of the Law of Israel: On the 100th Anniversary of the ‘Prolegomena’ (Report No. 14/79), Jerusalem: Institute for Advanced Studies of the Hebrew University (1980)
- The Organizational Pattern and the Penal Code of the Qumran Sect: A Comparison with Guilds and Religious Associations of the Hellenistic-Roman Period (NTOA, 2), Göttingen: Vandenhoeck & Ruprecht (1986)
- Deuteronomy 1-11 (Anchor Bible, 5), Garden City NY: Doubleday (1991)
- From Joshua to Josiah (1993)
- The Promise of the Land The Inheritance of the Land of Canaan by the Israelites Berkeley: University of California Press (1993)
- Social Justice in Ancient Israel and in the Ancient Near East, Minneapolis: Fortress, Jerusalem: Magnes Press (1995)
- The Place of the Law in the Religion of Ancient Israel (Vetus Testamentum Supplement), Leiden: E.J. Brill (2004)
- Normative and Sectarian Judaism in the Second Temple Period, New York: T & T Clark (2005)

== See also ==
- List of Israel Prize recipients
