= Arthur Boyd Houghton =

British painter (1836-1875)

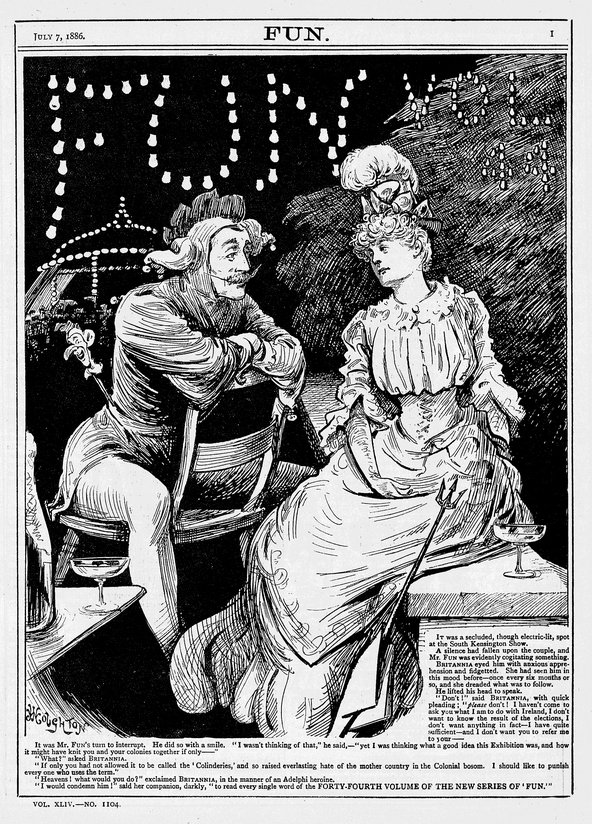
Houghton cartoon published by Fun magazine in 1886

Arthur Boyd Houghton (13 March 1836 – 25 November 1875) was a British painter (oil and watercolours) and illustrator.

Houghton was born in Kotagiri, Madras, India. His work was varied and was highly regarded during the mid-19th century. He traveled to America and Russia, creating illustrations for The Graphic and for numerous books, including The Arabian Nights and Don Quixote. His work was strongly influenced by the Pre-Raphaelite Brotherhood.

He played a leading role in the renaissance of wood-engraved illustration during the golden decade of English book illustration (c. 1860–75), when a new school of artists overcame the limitations of the medium. Deeply influenced by the idealism of the Pre-Raphaelite Brotherhood, he imbued both his paintings and drawings with a haunting blend of poetic realism. He was the fourth son of Captain John Michael Houghton (1797–1874), who served in the East India Company's Marine as a draughtsman.

Laurence Housman produced a selection from his work which was dedication to the artist's daughter Mrs E.C. Davis. (London: Kegan Paul, Trench, Trúbner & Co., 1896).

Paul Hogarth wrote a biography and monograph (London: Gordon Fraser, 1981).

Work by this artist is held within various public collections including Tate Britain in London; Ashmolean Museum, Oxford; British Museum, London; Fitzwilliam Museum, Cambridge; Museum of Fine Arts, Boston, as well as a number of private collections around the world.

Houghton is best known for wood-engravings but also produced a number of oil paintings and watercolours (usually based upon earlier wood-engravings), many of his wife and children, and others of crowded street scenes. He also wrote a little poetry which was published in his lifetime. When still a child, a shot fired from a toy cannon left him blind in one eye, and unable to sustain his concentration when painting large works for exhibition at the Royal Academy. He died in London.

== Gallery ==
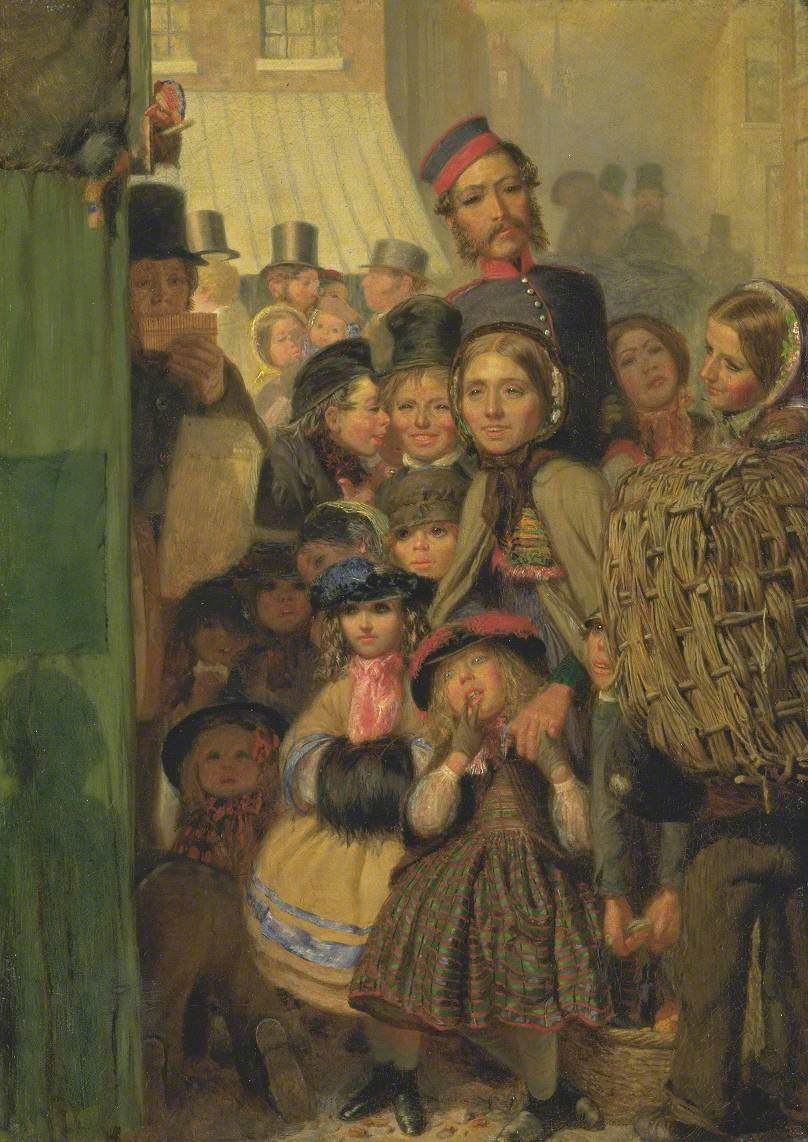
Punch and Judy, 1860

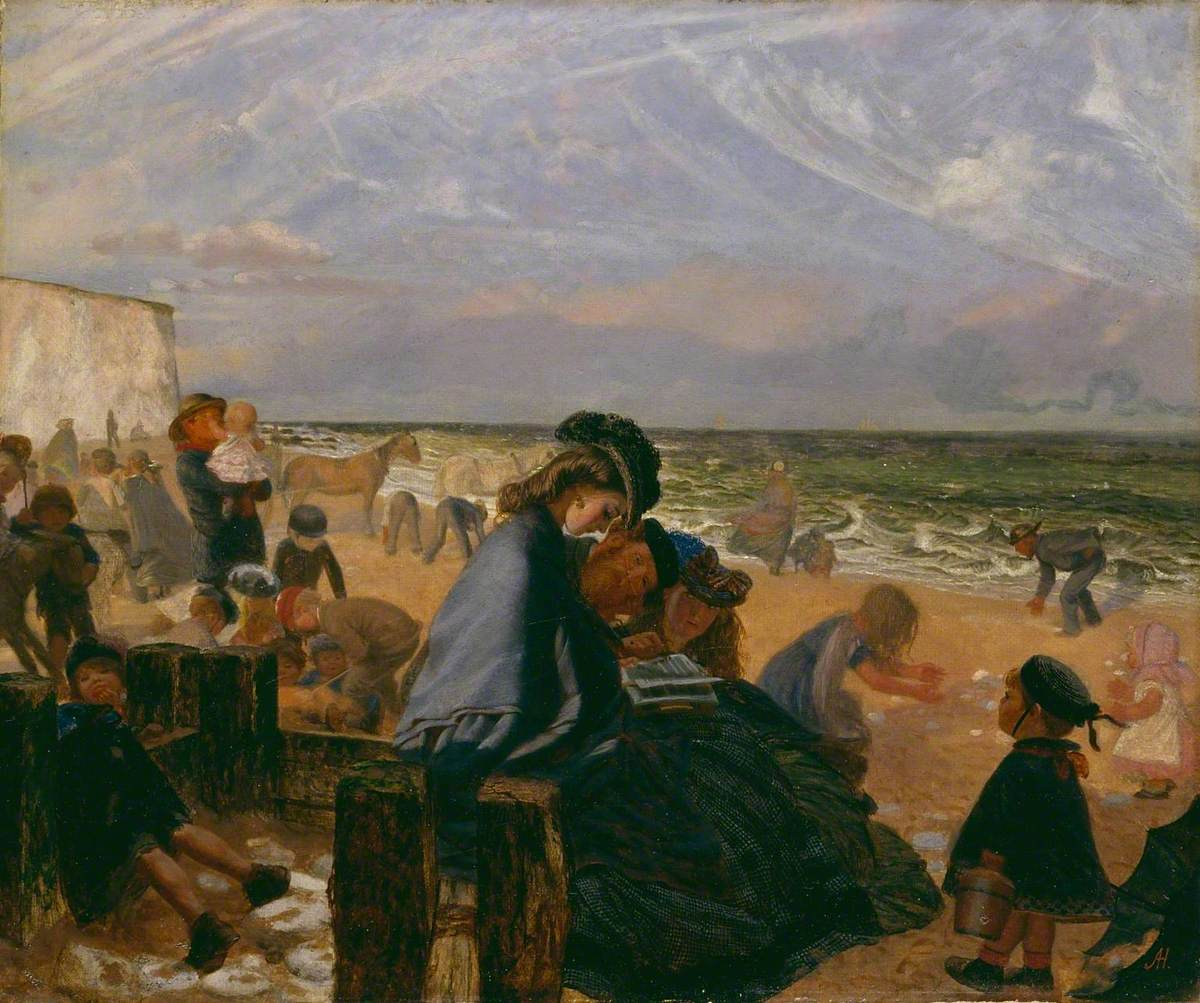
Ramsgate Sands, 1861

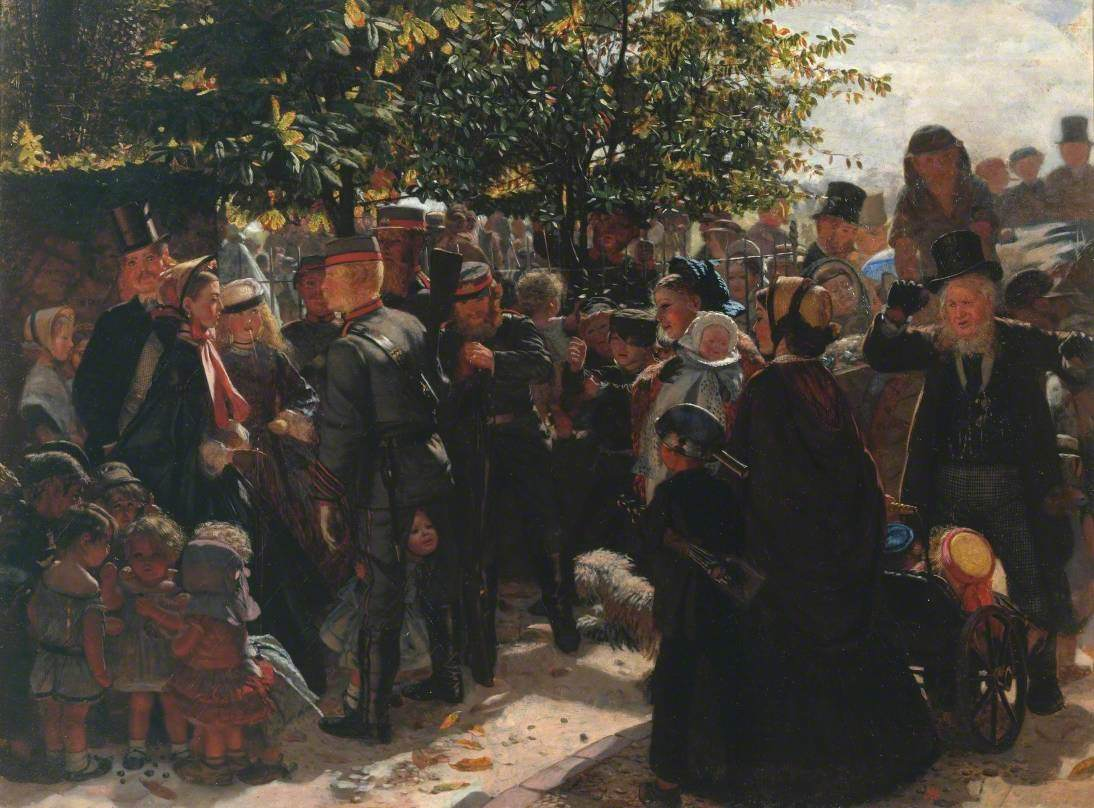
Volunteers, 1861

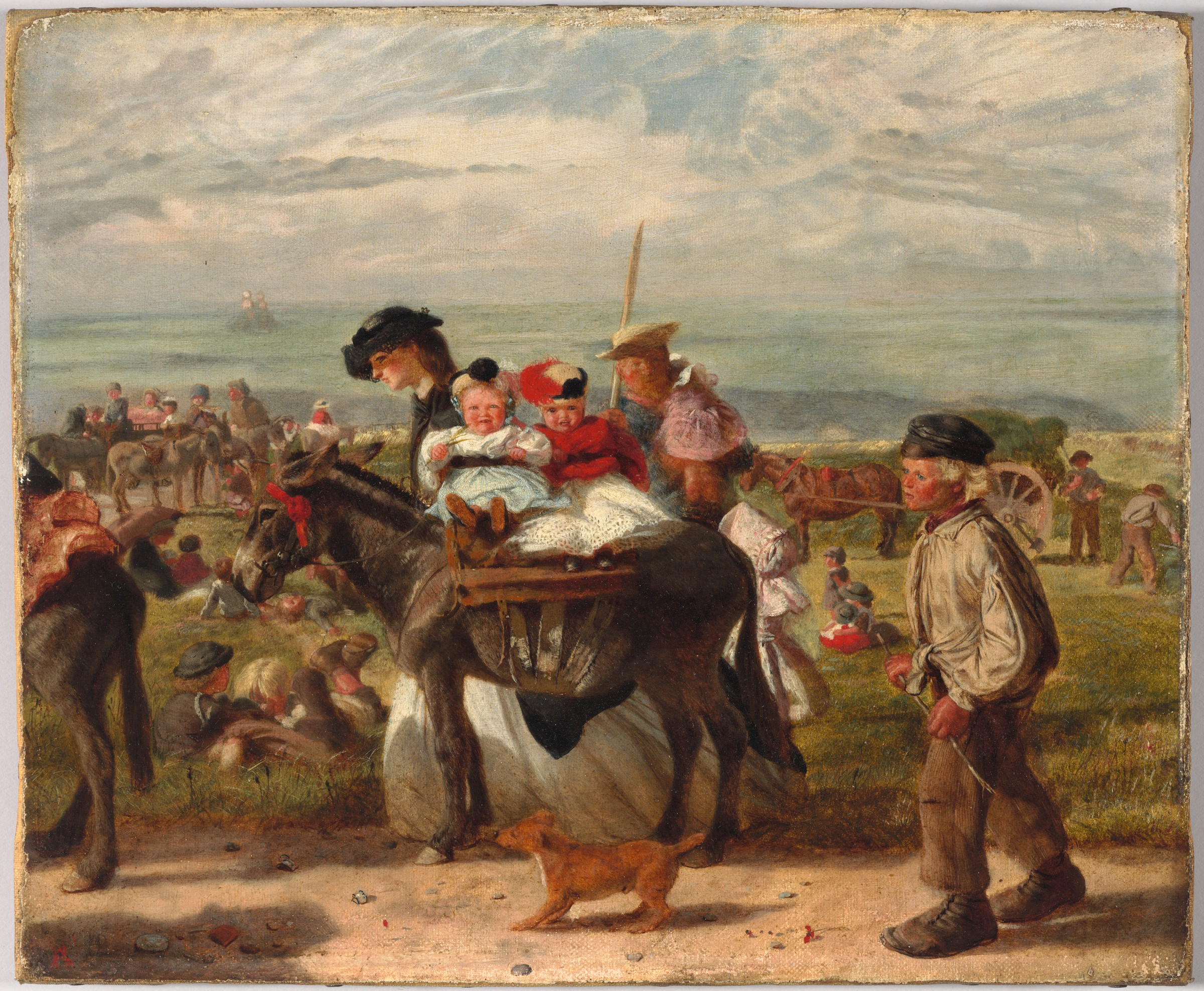
The Donkey Ride, 1862

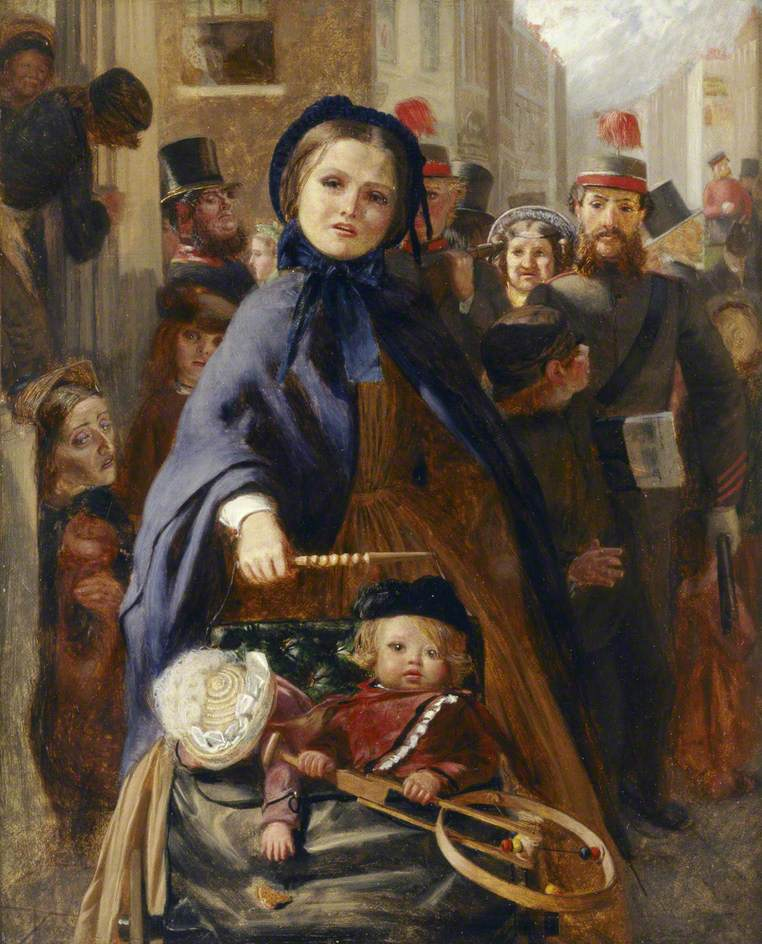
London in 1865, 1865
