= Hagrite =

Offshoot of Ishmaelites

The Hagrites (also spelled Hagarite or Hagerite, and called Hagarenes, Agarenes, and sons of Agar) were associated with the Ishmaelites mentioned in the Hebrew Bible, the inhabitants of the regions of Jetur, Naphish and Nodab lying east of Gilead. Their name is understood to be related to that of the biblical Hagar. They lived a nomadic, animal-herding lifestyle in sparsely populated land east of the Israelites.

Genesis 25:15 names Jetur as the tenth of the twelve sons of Ishmael, the oldest son of Abraham. The twelve sons of Ishmael are described in this context as "twelve princes according to their tribes".

According to First Chronicles 5:18-22, the Reubenites, Gadites, and the half of the tribe of Manasseh in Gilead brought 44,760 to battle with the Hagrites and defeated them. Through the battle, the Reubenites captured the Hagrite land as well as 50,000 camels, 250,000 sheep, 2,000 donkeys. Finally, the Reubenites captured 100,000 Hagrites, men, women and children and held them as captives. According to Theodor Nöldeke, these numbers are "enormously exaggerated".

King David of Israel made Jazziz the Hagrite steward of his flocks, but the Hagrites are not mentioned in the historical books as a distinct people after the reign of King David.

In Psalms 83:6, the Hagrites are included in a list of ten peoples that form a coalition to attack Israel for the purpose of total annihilation. Because the war described in Psalm 83 has not yet occurred historically, it is often designated a prophetic psalm describing future events.

== See also ==
- Comfort, Philip and Walter Elwell, Tyndale Bible Dictionary, Wheaton, Illinois: Tyndale House Publishers, 2001 ISBN 0-8423-7089-7
