= Tribe of Manasseh =

One of the two Half-Tribes of Joseph

According to the Hebrew Bible, the Tribe of Manasseh (/məˈnæsə/; Hebrew: שֵׁבֶט מְנַשֶּׁה Ševet Mənašše, Tiberian: Šēḇeṭ Mănašše) was one of the twelve tribes of Israel. After the Assyrian invasion of 720 BCE, it is counted as one of the ten lost tribes. Together with the Tribe of Ephraim, Manasseh also formed the House of Joseph.

== Symbols ==
The 1906 Jewish Encyclopedia says that the Talmud describes their banner while en route to Canaan from Egypt as a black flag with an embroidered unicorn.

== Biblical narrative ==
According to the Tanakh, the Tribe of Manasseh was a part of a loose confederation of Israelite tribes from after the conquest of the land by Joshua until the formation of the first Kingdom of Israel in c. 1050 BC. No central government existed, and in times of crisis the people were led by ad hoc leaders known as Judges (see Book of Judges). With the growth of the threat from Philistine incursions, the Israelite tribes decided to form a strong centralised monarchy to meet the challenge, and the Tribe of Manasseh joined the new kingdom with Saul as the first king. After the death of Saul, all the tribes other than Judah remained loyal to the House of Saul, but after the death of Ish-bosheth, Saul's son who succeeded him to the throne of Israel, the Tribe of Manasseh joined the other northern Israelite tribes in making Judah's king David the king of a re-united Kingdom of Israel. However, on the accession of David's grandson Rehoboam, in c. 930 BC the northern tribes split from the House of David and from Saul's tribe Benjamin to reform Israel as the Northern Kingdom. Manasseh was a member of the Northern Kingdom until the kingdom was conquered by Assyria in c. 723 BC and the population deported.

From that time, the Tribe of Manasseh has been counted as one of the ten lost tribes of Israel.

== Tribal territory ==
Territory allotted to the twelve tribes of Israel; Manasseh was given the large green-yellow area

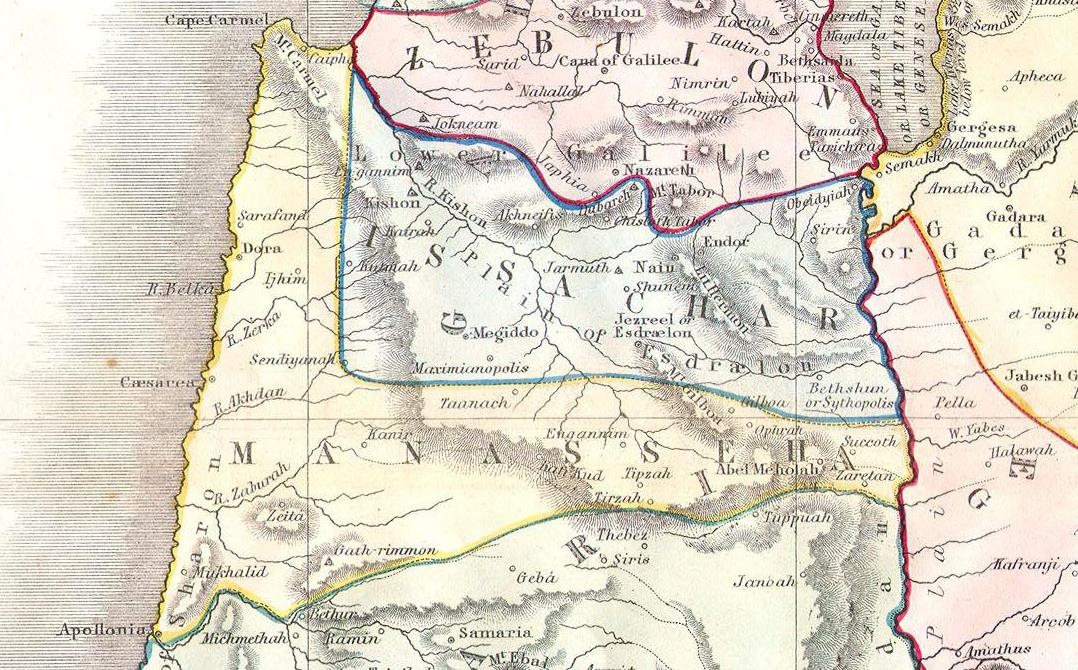
An alternative reconstruction makes the western and eastern territories discontinuous (1852 map).

The Bible narrates that following the completion of the conquest of Canaan by the Israelite tribes, Joshua allocated the land among the twelve tribes. According to biblical scholar Kenneth Kitchen, this conquest should be dated slightly after 1200 BCE. Some modern scholars argue that the conquest of Joshua, as described in the Book of Joshua, never occurred. "Besides the rejection of the Albrightian 'conquest' model, the general consensus among OT scholars is that the Book of Joshua has no value in the historical reconstruction. They see the book as an ideological retrojection from a later period—either as early as the reign of Josiah or as late as the Hasmonean period." "It behooves us to ask, in spite of the fact that the overwhelming consensus of modern scholarship is that Joshua is a pious fiction composed by the deuteronomistic school, how does and how has the Jewish community dealt with these foundational narratives, saturated as they are with acts of violence against others?" Recent decades, for example, have seen a remarkable reevaluation of evidence concerning the conquest of the land of Canaan by Joshua. As more sites have been excavated, there has been a growing consensus that the main story of Joshua, that of a speedy and complete conquest (e.g. Josh. 11.23: 'Thus Joshua conquered the whole country, just as the LORD had promised Moses') is contradicted by the archaeological record, though there are indications of some destruction at the appropriate time.

In the Book of Joshua, it is claimed that at its height, the territory Manasseh occupied spanned the Jordan River, forming two "half-tribes", one on each side; the eastern half-tribe was, by most accounts, almost entirely discontiguous with the western half-tribe, only slightly touching at one corner—the southwest of East Manasseh and the northeast of West Manasseh.

West Manasseh occupied the land to the immediate north of Ephraim, thus just north of centre of western Canaan, between the Jordan and the coast, with the northwest corner at Mount Carmel, and neighbored on the north by tribes Asher and Issachar. East Manasseh was the northernmost Israelite group east of the Jordan until the siege of Laish farther north by the tribe of Dan; other neighboring tribes were Gad on the south and Naphtali and Issachar on the west. East Manasseh occupied the land from the Mahanaim in the south to Mount Hermon in the north, and including within it the whole of Bashan. These territories abounded in water, a precious commodity in Canaan, thus constituting one of the most valuable parts of the country; additionally, Manasseh's geographic situation enabled it to defend two important mountain passes—Esdraelon on the west of the Jordan and Hauran on the east.

The half-tribe of Manasseh had the land from Jordan to the city Dora; but its breadth was at Bethshan, which is now called Scythopolis.

In c. 732 BCE, Pekah, king of Israel (Samaria) allied with Rezin, king of Aram, and threatened Jerusalem. Ahaz, king of Judah, appealed to Tiglath-Pileser III, the king of Assyria, for help. After receiving tribute from Ahaz, Tiglath-Pileser sacked Damascus and Israel, annexing Aram and the territory east of the Jordan (tribes of Reuben, Gad and East Manasseh in Gilead), including the desert outposts of Jetur, Naphish and Nodab. The population of these territories were taken captive and resettled in Assyria, in the region of the Khabur River system. (2 Kings 16:9 and 15:29) The diminished kingdom of Israel was again invaded by Assyria in 723 BCE and the rest of the population deported.

The riverine gulch, naḥal Ḳanah (Joshua 17:9), divided Ephraim's territory in the south from Manasseh's territory in the north. The modern Israeli settlement of Karnei Shomron is built near this gulch, which runs in an easterly-westerly direction.

== Origin ==
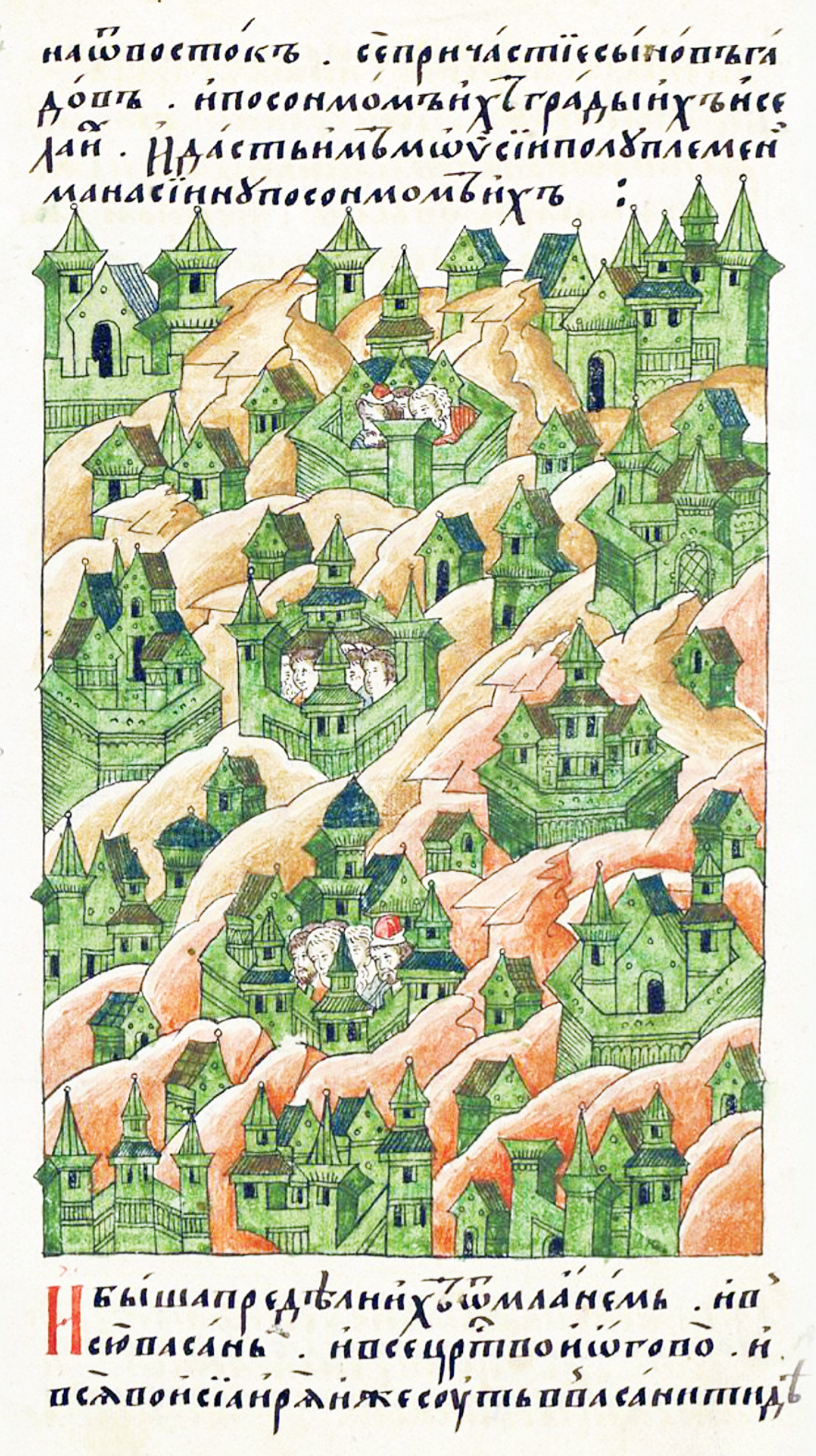
Lands given to Tribe of Manasseh by Joshua after his wars

According to the Torah, the tribe consisted of descendants of Manasseh, a son of Joseph, from whom it took its name. Some critics, however, view this as a postdiction, an eponymous metaphor providing an aetiology of the connectedness of the tribe to others in the Israelite confederation In the Biblical account, Joseph is one of the two children of Rachel and Jacob, a brother to Benjamin, and father to both Ephraim, and his first son, Manasseh; Ephraim received the blessing of the firstborn, although Manasseh was the eldest, because Jacob foresaw that Ephraim's descendants would be greater than his brother's. Here the blessing of the first son was conferred by a grandfather rather than by the father, despite prevailing custom (great patriarchs supersede custom).

Though the biblical descriptions of the geographic boundary of the House of Joseph are fairly consistent, the descriptions of the boundaries between Manasseh and Ephraim are not, and each is portrayed as having exclaves within the territory of the other. Furthermore, in the Blessing of Jacob, and elsewhere ascribed by textual scholars to a similar or earlier time period, (e.g., Joshua 17:14–18) Ephraim and Manasseh are treated as a single tribe, with Joseph appearing in their place. From this it is regarded that originally Ephraim and Manasseh were considered one tribe—that of Joseph.

== Fate ==
As part of the Kingdom of Israel, the territory of Manasseh was conquered by the Assyrians in the 720's BC, and many members of the tribe were exiled; others fled south to the Kingdom of Judah. Either way, the manner of their exile and dispersal led to their further history being lost. However, several modern day groups claim descent, with varying levels of academic and rabbinical support. Both the Bnei Menashe and the Samaritans claim that some of their adherents are descended from this tribe.

== According to Biblical criticism ==
Although Machir and Gilead, as individuals, are described in biblical genealogies as father and son, and as son and grandson of Manasseh, in the view of some critical scholars Machir and Gilead are treated as the names of tribes which are different from one another in the Song of Deborah. (Tradition regards these as region names with the region Gilead being named so, long before the grandson of Manasseh.) Additionally, Manasseh is absent from the poem; in the Elohist texts Manasseh is also frequently absent, while Machir is mentioned. Additionally, Machir is described as settling on the east of the Jordan River, leaving the absence of the western half of Manasseh in these passages still unaccounted for. Critical scholars argue that the two sections had different origins, noting that in the First Book of Chronicles separate tribal rulers were named for the western half tribe and the eastern half tribe.
