= Rujm al-Malfouf =

Ammonite or Roman tower in Amman, Jordan

Rujm al-Malfouf (North)
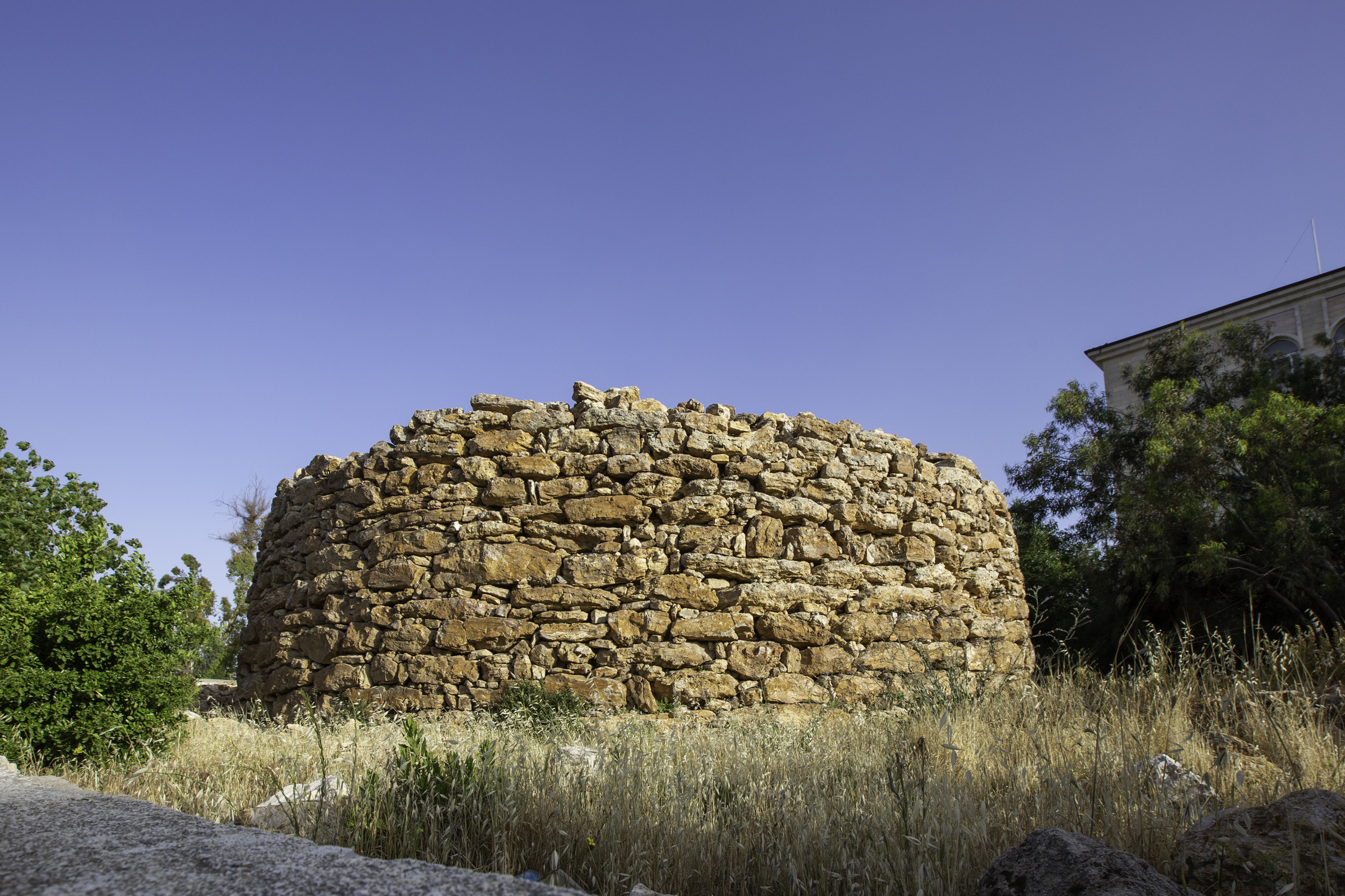
- Rujm al-Malfouf North

- Location within Jordan
- 31.95772°N 35.904613°E
- Type: Ammonite tower

History
- Built: 6th-5th century BCE (?); at least reused in the Roman period

Site notes
- Public access: Yes

Rujm Al-Malfouf is an ancient structure consisting of a round stone tower and several adjacent storerooms, located in the northern side of the Jabal Amman neighborhood of Amman, Jordan.

The structure was likely built in the 7th century BC during the Ammonite Kingdom, and was rebuilt and reused during the later Roman and Islamic periods. The site was excavated several times between 1969 and 2022, where several coins, potteries, and stamps were found. The tower-like building is similar to several structures on the plateaus of central Jordan, which were interpreted as "Ammonite towers" in the sense of border forts by Nelson Glueck in 1939, but are more recently considered to have fulfilled a variety of purposes across many historical periods, mainly of an agricultural and military nature.

On the southwestern side of Jabal Amman, a similar, now destroyed, smaller Ammonite tower stood, which is known as Rujm al-Malfouf South. It had a 13 meters diameter, compared to this tower's 22 meters diameter.

The site currently sits amidst a residential neighborhood, adjacent to Jordan's Department of Antiquities, and the Algerian embassy.

== Etymology ==
Rujm al-Malfouf can be translated as "heap of stones that are round". The translation "cabbage" for mafluf is rejected by P. M. Bikai. The Arabic word rujm, used as part of toponyms, means pile of stones, cairn, sometimes tumulus.

== Research ==
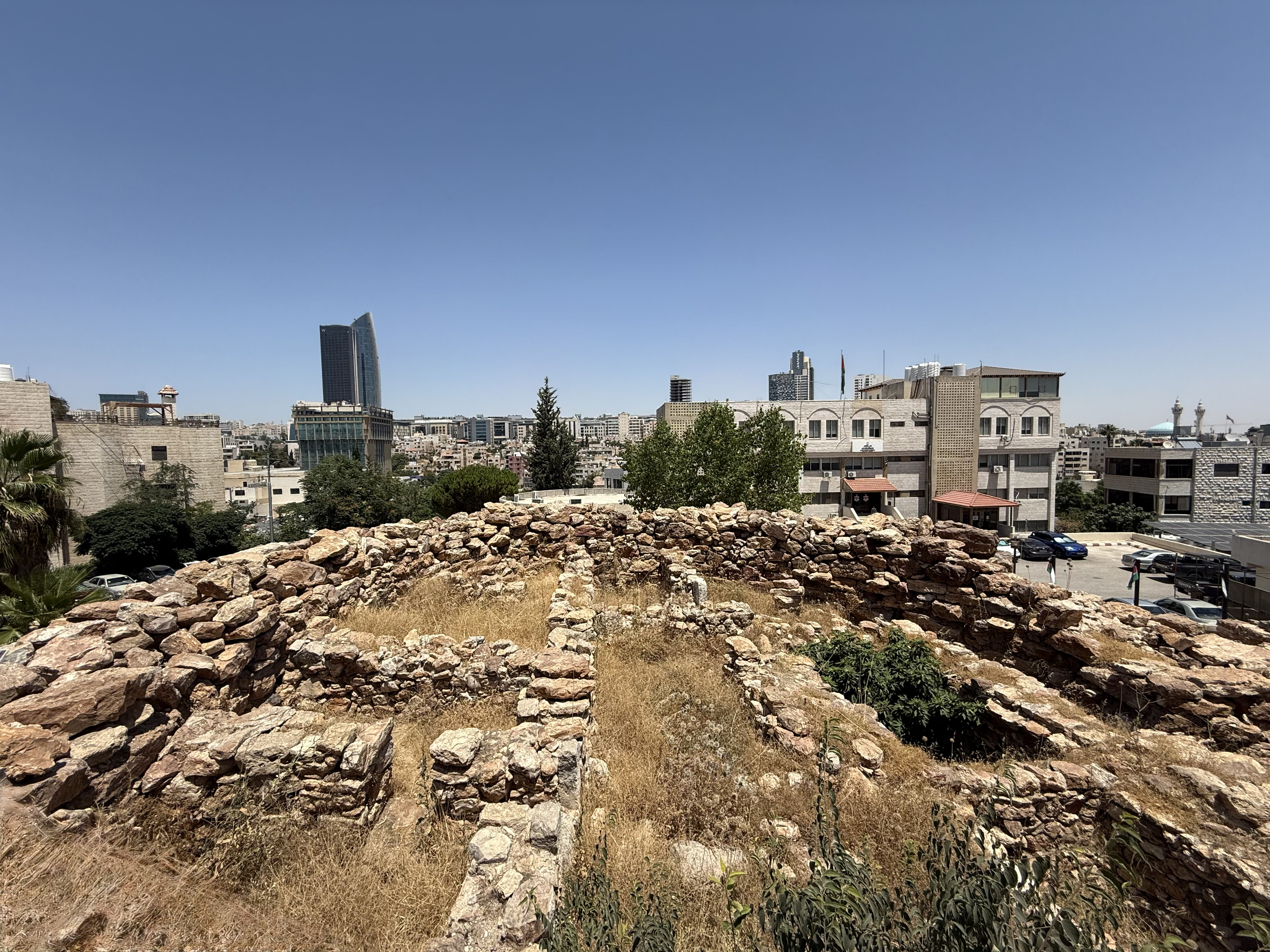
View of the top of Rujm Al-Malfouf tower, with the modern New Abdali towers in the background, 2026.

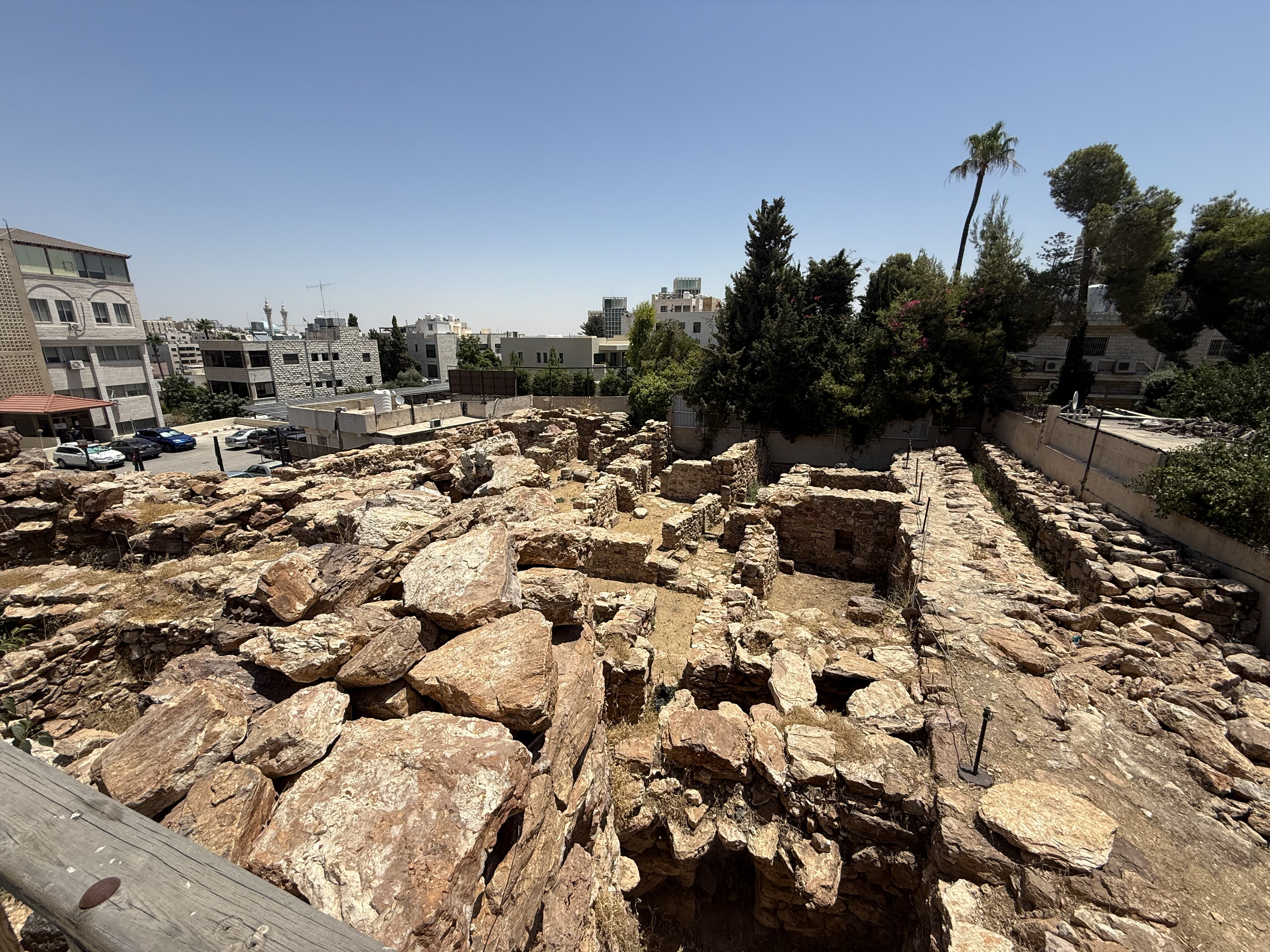
View of the ruins behind the tower.

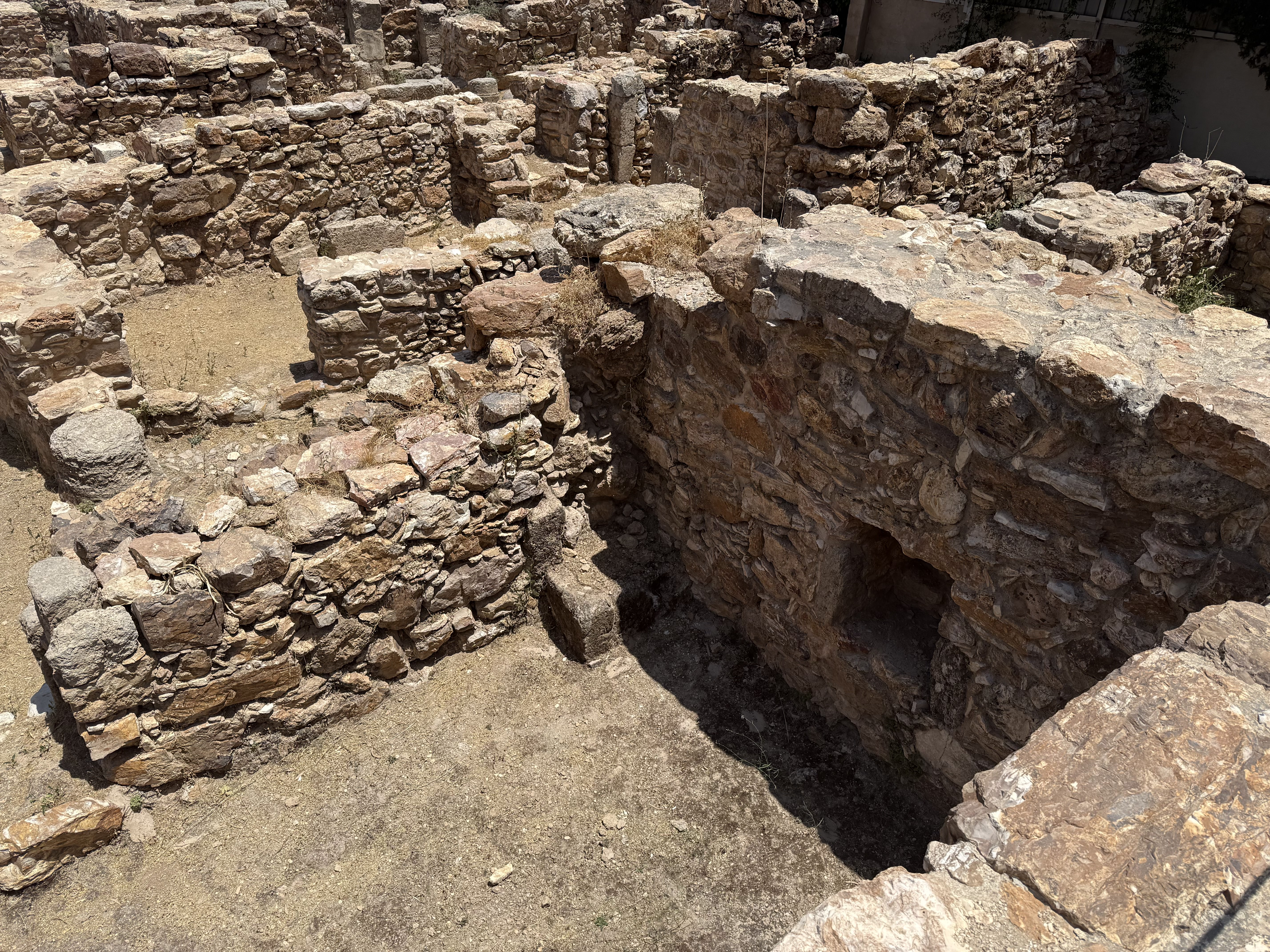
One of the rooms within Rujm Al-Malfouf site.

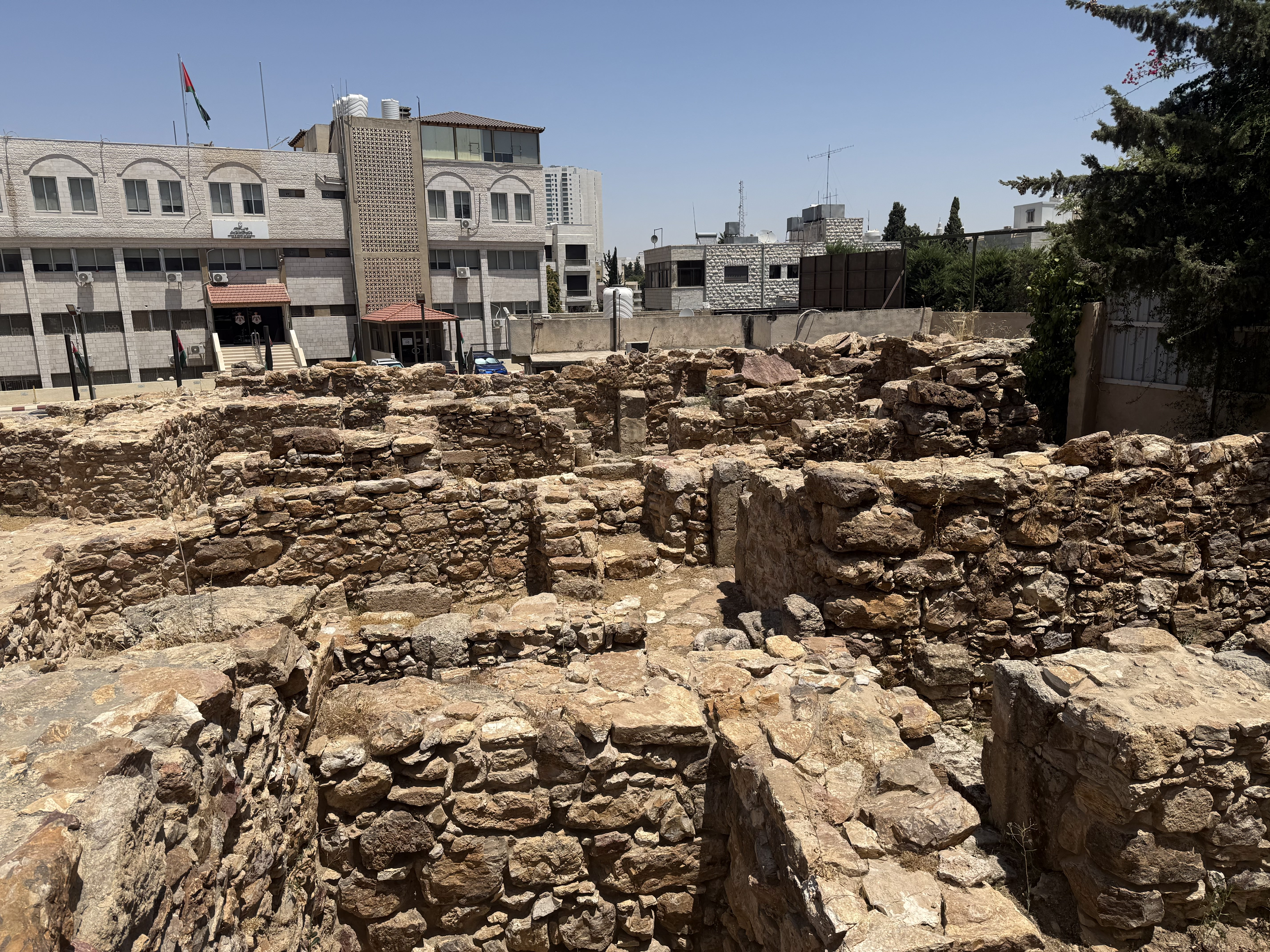
The Jordanian Department of Antiquities building adjacent to the Rujm Al-Malfouf site.

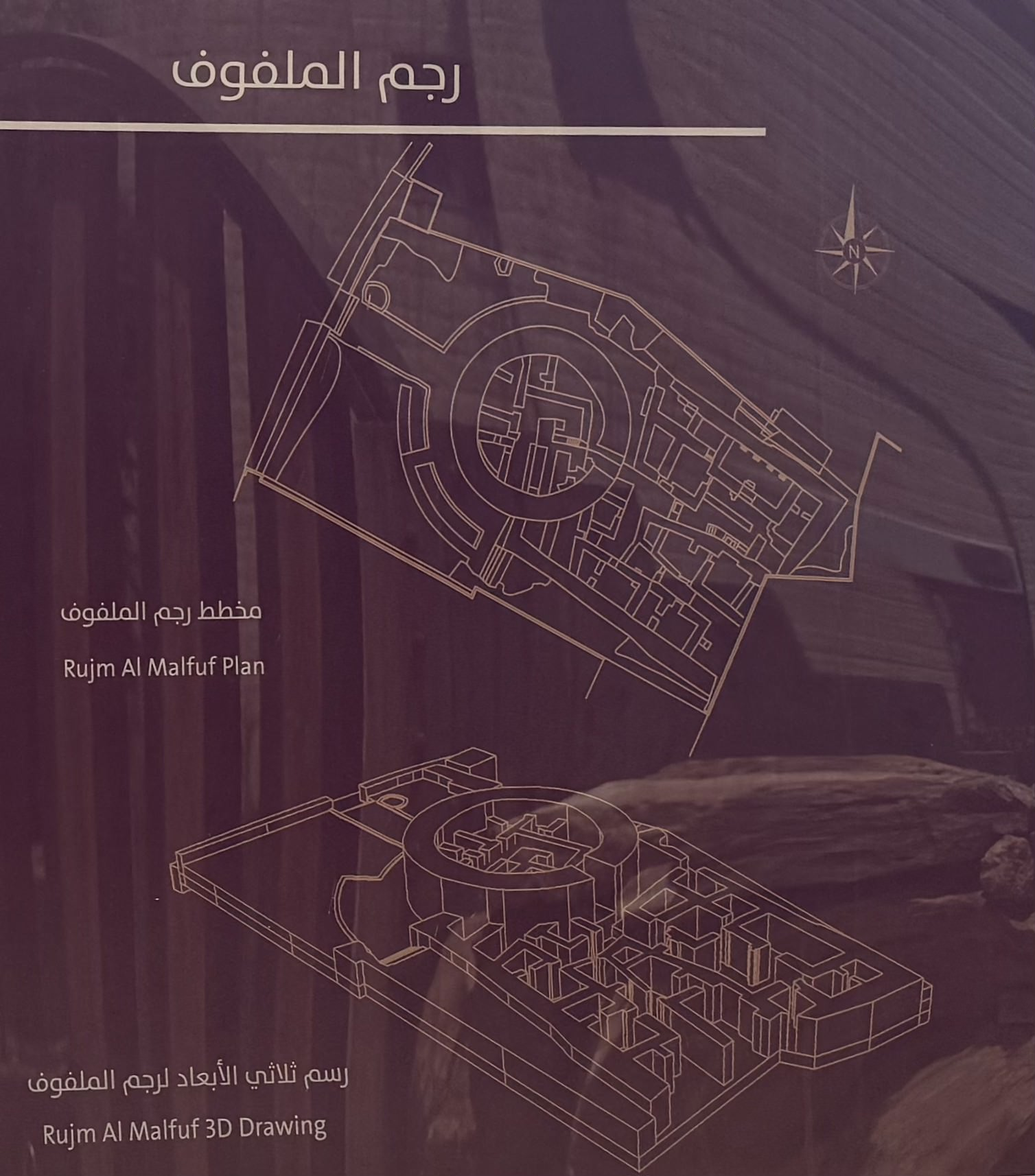
3D drawing of the Rujm Al-Malfouf site.

=== Features ===
Rujm el-Malfuf North was excavated in 1969 by Roger Boraas, who published his report in 1971. The round part of the structure is 22 m in diametre. It is the only round rujm-type building in this category known, as of 1991, to have had an entrance; the others might have been accessed by ladder. The split-level entrance led to a ground floor or basement whose floor was directly on the bedrock, and to an upper floor above it, the two levels being separated by a Roman-style corbel ceiling/floor resting on partition walls. The building was plastered on the outside, as was Rujm el-Malfuf South, possibly to make it harder to climb for attackers. Partition walls present at every site indicate the existence of either a corbelled roof, or one held by wooden beams.

=== Date ===
Dating the stone structures in the area has proven to be very difficult, too few of them being excavated - some not at all, others just partially -, with pottery being the main means of establishing a relative date, and even that based on the assumption that the ceramic sequence east of the River Jordan would be the same as west of it.

Kletter (1991) called the entire typological group "Rujm el-Malfuf buildings", although ironically Rujm al-Malfouf North is the only example of an "Ammonite tower", to use Glueck's term, which yielded only Roman-period findings at the 1969 excavation, leaving it isolated in this regard. Roger Boraas excavated two areas down to bedrock, inside and outside the tower, and only found Roman-period pottery sherds. However, Yassine (1988) quotes Langer de Polacky, who did additional work at the site after Boraas but didn't publish it, and who claimed to have found 6th-5th-century BCE pottery in the lower levels of the tower.

Based on the majority of the pottery findings across all known similar buildings, Kletter felt confident to date the entire category to the Assyrian period at the end of the Iron Age, i.e. to ca. 730-630/620 BCE, without ruling out that some might have been built or used during the next period, of Babylonian dominance.

Younger, writing in 1989, offered a much more varied image, noting that 3 of the 29 "tower sites" were in use during the Late Bronze Age, 7 in Iron I, with the majority, 24, in Iron II, 9 in the Roman period, 19 in the Byzantine period, and 9 in the Umayyad period, adding that more sites than expected had been in use during the Persian and Hellenistic periods as well.

=== Typology ===
There are buildings initially considered to be contemporary to Rujm al-Malfouf, of an either round plan, or a rectangular or square one, in Glueck's and Kletter's terms: rujms if round, qasrs (kasers) if rectangular/square. They can occur isolated, in groups, next to each other and sometimes sharing walls, and even within each other, sometimes even as conglomerations of both types with a dominant massive "tower", round or rectangular, at their core.

Kletter saw the round rujms as unique to the Amman area, in both plan and design. The same couldn't be claimed of the rectangular and square buildings, even while he saw them as contemporary and sometimes intertwined with the round ones, because their plan is much more common.

=== Purpose ===
Kletter (1991) considered that there was no clarity about the purpose of the "Rujm el-Malfuf buildings". He saw as possible that they served a defensive purpose, but noticed that their location and design speaks against a centralised (royal) project of creating military forts; he saw it as more likely that they could have offered shelter to local people. Kletter also noticed the similarity with the noterot, "stone huts" from Cisjordan/the West Bank, which were used by farmers during harvest time, while also boasting thick walls and rising up to 8 metres high. They date from the Hellenistic period through to modern times. While several "Rujm el-Malfuf buildings" might have served the same agricultural purpose as the noterot, others are by far too large (up to 40x50 m) to be seen as mere "stone huts".

Kletter saw large "Rujm el-Malfuf buildings" as settlements inhabited by an extended family or small clan, also offering some protection in times of danger.

Younger, also writing in 1991, concludes that many structures had proven to be either lime kilns, field shelters, and agricultural complexes - smaller farmsteads or larger estates.

=== Distribution ===
In 1991, Kletter wrote of at least 34 round rujms known from 24 locations, and some 100 rectangular or square buildings from 70 sites. While aware of the incompleteness of survey data, he ventured to place them all within a territory of similar climatic and topographic conditions (over 200 mm of rain per year, on the plateau above the Jordan Valley and west of the desert), and between what he saw as Ammon's boundaries toward Assyrian Gilead to the north and Moab to the south. However, once his "Iron-Age-only" paradigm lost traction, much of his rationale lost its justification, too. Additionally, a whole cluster of similar structures were discovered in the Madaba Plain, i.e. in Moab, if one were to apply the Iron Age terms to other periods as well.

== See also ==
- Ammon, ancient kingdom
- Jabal Amman, a central hill of the city
- Jabal al-Qal'a, Amman's 'Citadel Hill'
- Rujm (see here in the 'Etymology' section)
