= Mujib Biosphere Reserve =

Biosphere reserve in Jordan, designated in 2011

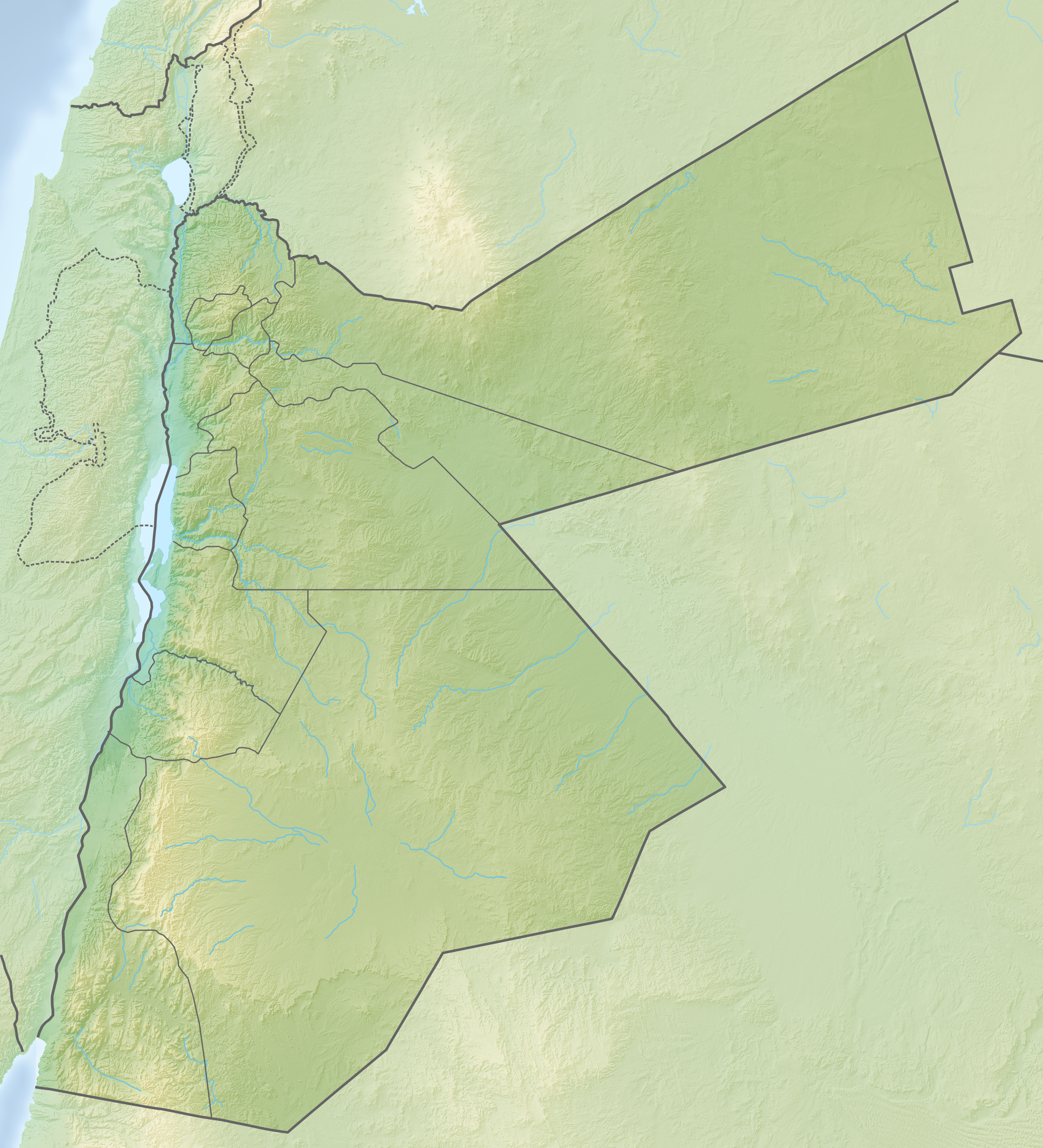
- Location within Jordan
- Nearest city: Amman
- Coordinates: 31°29′34″N 35°36′18″E

The Mujib Biosphere Reserve (Arabic:محمية الموجب للمحيط الحيوي) is a nature reserve bordering the Dead Sea in Jordan, making it the lowest nature reserve in the world. Established as a reserve in 1985, it encompasses an area of around 212 square kilometres (82 sq mi). In 2011, UNESCO declared Mujib a biosphere reserve. It is managed by the Royal Society for the Conservation of Nature.

== Description ==
The reserve is located about 85 kilometres (53 mi) from Amman, the capital and largest city of Jordan, and approximately 32 kilometres (20 mi) north of Al-Karak.

It lies in the Jordan Rift Valley. To the west, it borders the Dead Sea coast for about 24 kilometres (15 mi). Its altitude ranges from 402 metres (1,319 ft), 416 metres (1,365 ft) or 420 metres (1,380 ft) below sea level at the Dead Sea coast to about 800 metres (2,600 ft) in the eastern highlands, with mountains rising up to 900 metres (3,000 ft).

There are three main rivers—Wadi Mujib (which flows into the Dead Sea), Wadi Hidan and Wadi Zarqa Ma'in—and several others, such as Wadi Attoun, Wadi Abu Retama and Wadi Shegeig. These wadis support wetland habitats.

== History of Wadi Mujib ==
Wadi Mujib was know as the Arnon in biblical times. Bible scholars have noticed a seeming contradiction in the Hebrew Bible regarding the ownership of the area between the Arnon and Jabbok rivers. According to Numbers, that area originally belonged to the Moabites and was later conquered by Sihon, king of the Amorites, before the Israelites took it (Numbers 21:13–26). However, Judges presents this land as initially Ammonite territory, which the Israelites took from Sihon.(Judges 11:18).

Mesha, king of Moab, mentioned it on the Mesha Stele, translated as "I made a road in the Arnon" or "I have made the highway at the Arnon".

== Flora and fauna ==
Its diverse elevations support over 300 plant species. Among these are:

- umbrella thorn
- helleborine
- crocus
- moringa
- white willow
- terebinth
- tamarisk
- boxthorn
- giant horsetail

Migratory birds who stop here include:

- white stork
- black stork
- buzzard
- honey buzzard
- lesser kestrel
- Levant sparrowhawk

Mammals include:

- Nubian ibex
- rock hyrax
- Eurasian badger
- caracal
