= Wadi Mujib =

River in Jordan, near the Dead Sea

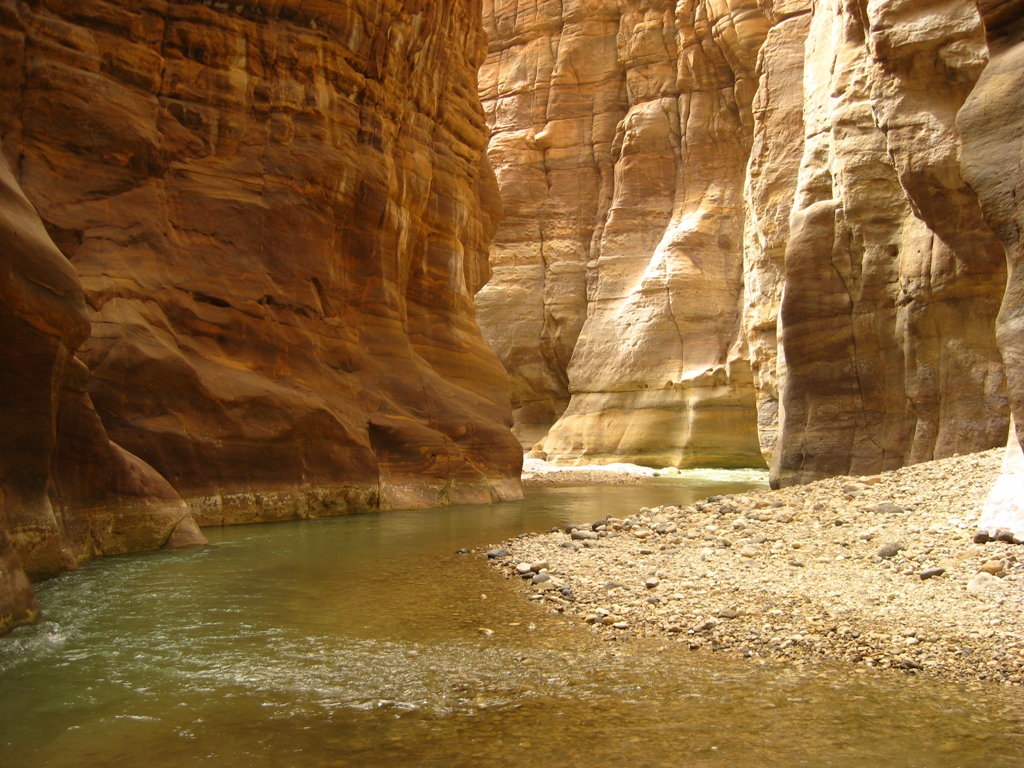
- Slot canyon of Wadi Mujib

- Location, at south of map, marked "R. Arnon"
- Coordinates: 31°27′57″N 35°34′24″E
- Area: 212 square kilometres (81.9 sq mi)
- Established: 1987
- Governing body: Royal Society for the Conservation of Nature

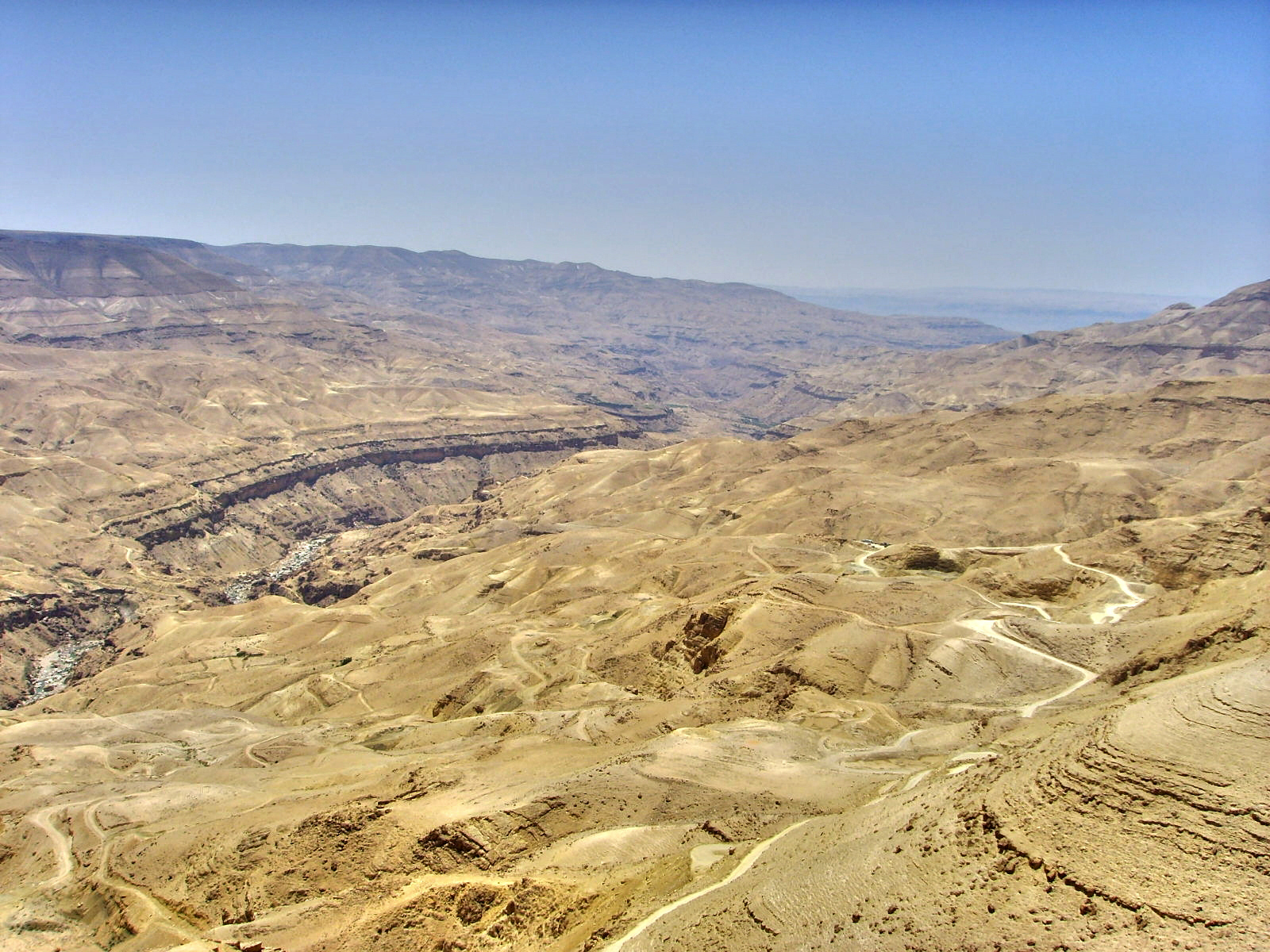

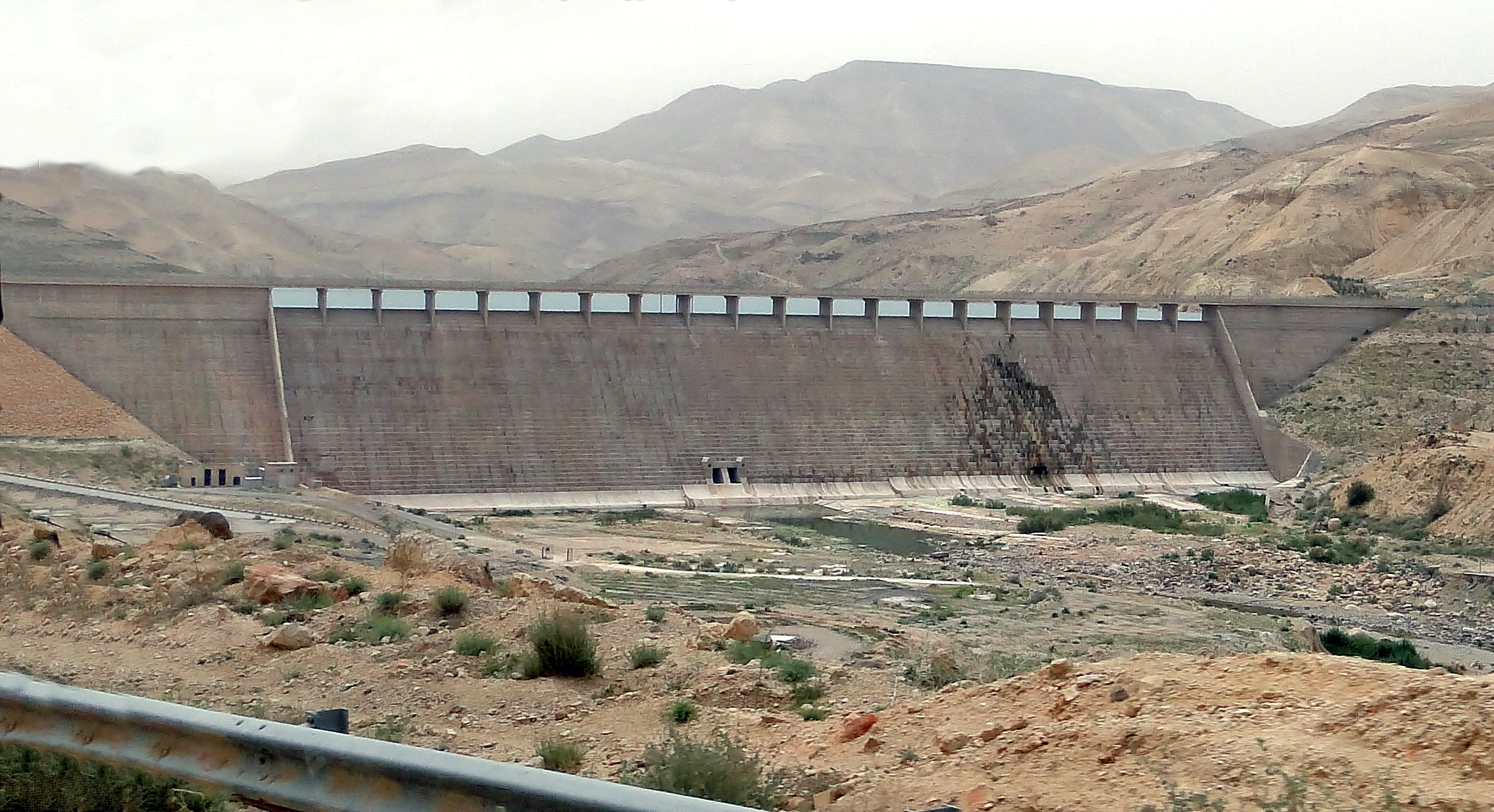
Al Mujib dam

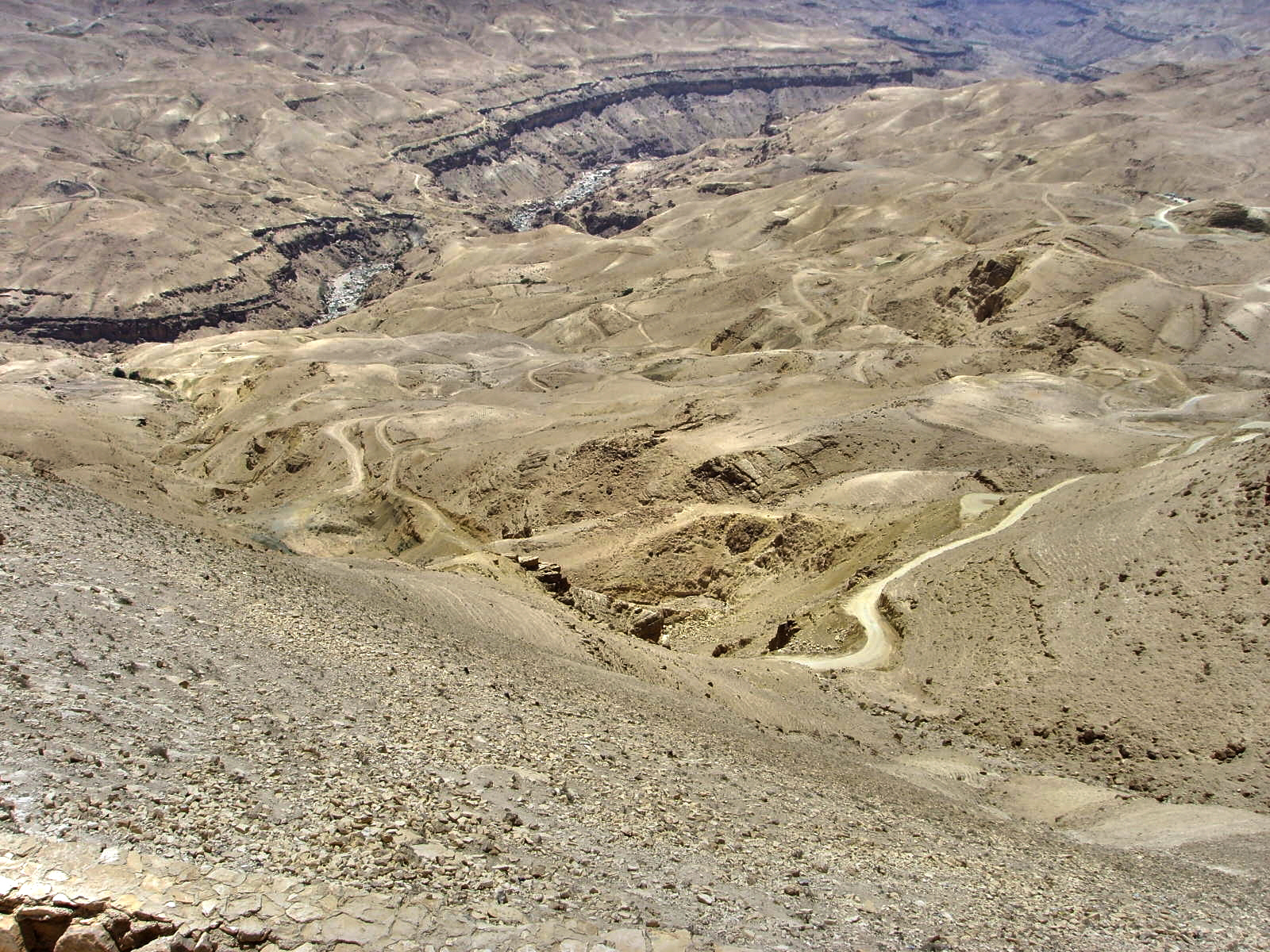

The Wadi Mujib (Arabic: وادي الموجب, romanized: Wādī al-Mūjib), is a river in Jordan. The river empties into the Dead Sea circa 420 metres (1,380 ft) below sea level.

In ancient times, the river served as the northern boundary of the kingdom of Moab.

Today, the Wadi Mujib is fed by seven tributaries. The western part of the river is the site of the Mujib Biosphere Reserve, popular for hikes and canyoning amid dramatic rock formations.

== Geography ==
Wadi Mujib looking east in summertime

During the last ice age the water level of the Dead Sea reached 180 metres (590 ft) below sea level, about 240 metres (790 ft) higher than it is today. It flooded the lower areas of the canyons along its banks, which became bays and begun to accumulate sediments. As the climatic conditions changed, about 20,000 years ago, the water level of the lake dropped, leaving the re-emergent canyons blocked with lake marl. Most canyons managed to cut through their plugged outlets and to resume their lower courses; but Wadi Mujib abandoned its former outlet by breaking through a cleft in the sandstone. This narrow cleft became the bottleneck of an enormous drainage basin of 6,571 km^{2} (2,537 sq mi) with a huge discharge and annual sediment yield of 143,780 tonnes. During the years the cleft was scoured deeper and the gorge of Wadi Mujib was formed.

The Mujib Dam was completed in 2004 at the bottom of the wadi, where the modern road crosses the river. As a result, a large lake has formed.

=== Mujib Reserve ===
The Mujib Reserve of Wadi Mujib is located in the mountainous landscape to the east of the Dead Sea, in the southern part of Jordan valley, approximately 90 kilometres (56 mi) south of Amman. A 212 km^{2} (82 sq mi) reserve was created in 1985 by the Royal Society for the Conservation of Nature and is regionally and internationally important, particularly for the bird life that the reserve supports. In 2011, UNESCO declared Mujib a biosphere reserve. It extends to the Kerak and Madaba mountains to the north and south, reaching 1,277 metres (4,190 ft) above sea level in some places. This 1,708-metre (5,604 ft) variation in elevation of its drainage basin, combined with the valley's year-round water flow from seven tributaries, means that Wadi Mujib enjoys magnificent biodiversity that is still being explored and documented. The reserve consists of mountainous, rocky, and sparsely vegetated desert (up to 800 metres (2,600 ft)), with cliffs and gorges cutting through plateaus. Perennial, spring-fed streams flow to the Dead Sea.

Over 300 species of plants, 10 species of carnivores and numerous species of permanent and migratory birds have been recorded. Some of the remote mountain and valley areas are difficult to reach, and thus offer safe haven for rare species of cats, goats and other mountain animals.

The slopes of the mountainous land are very sparsely vegetated, with a steppe-type vegetation on plateaus. Groundwater seepage does occur in places along the Dead Sea shore, for example at the hot springs of Zara, which support a luxuriant thicket of Acacia, Tamarix, Phoenix and Nerium, and a small marsh. The less severe slopes of the reserve are used by pastoralists for the grazing of sheep and goats.

The hot springs of Hammamat Ma'in lie close to the borders of the reserve and popular for tourism and recreation.

The Jordanian military have a temporary camp in the south of the reserve.

== Biology and ecology ==
=== Fauna ===
The reserve is strategically important as a safe stop-over for the huge number of migratory birds which fly annually along the Great Rift Valley between Africa and northeast Europe.

It is possible to see the following birds in Wadi Mujib:

- Lammergeier (Gypaetus barbatus)
- Egyptian vulture (Neophron percnopterus)
- Eurasian griffon (Gyps fulvus)
- Levant sparrowhawk (Accipiter brevipes)
- Lesser kestrel (Falco naumanni)
- Sooty falcon (Falco concolor)
- Sand partridge (Ammoperdix heyi)
- Hume's owl (Strix butleri)
- Hooded wheatear (Oenanthe monacha)
- Blackstart (Cercomela melanura)
- Arabian babbler (Turdoides squamiceps)
- Striolated bunting (Emberiza striolata)
- Trumpeter finch (Bucanetes githagineus)
- Dead Sea sparrow (Passer moabiticus)
- Tristram's starling (Onychognathus tristramii)

Many carnivores also inhabit the various vegetation zones in Mujib, such as the striped hyena and the Syrian wolf.

Another common animal in Mujib is the Nubian ibex, a large mountain goat which became threatened as a result of over-hunting.

== History ==
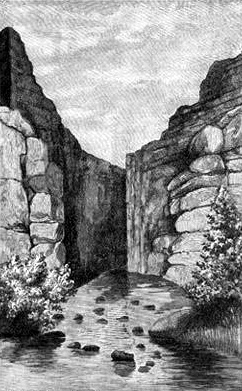
Gorge of the River Arnon Near Its Mouth. From Stade, "Geschichte des Volkes Israel."

=== Iron Age and biblical narrative ===
Wadi Mujib, or the Arnon Stream as it was known in biblical times, has always been an important boundary-line. Bible scholars have noticed a seeming contradiction in the Hebrew Bible regarding the ownership of the area between the Arnon and Jabbok rivers. According to Numbers, that area originally belonged to the Moabites and was later conquered by Sihon, king of the Amorites, before the Israelites took it (Numbers 21:13–26). However, Judges presents this land as initially Ammonite territory, which the Israelites took from Sihon.(Judges 11:18).

Following the Israelite settlement the stream divided, theoretically at least, Moab from the tribes of Reuben and Gad (Deuteronomy 3:12–16). But Moab, in fact, lay as much to the north as it did to the south of the Arnon. To the north, for example, were Aroer, Dibon, Medeba, and other Moabite towns. Even under Omri and Ahab, who held part of the Moabite territory, Israel did not hold sway farther south than Ataroth, about ten miles north of the Arnon.

Mesha, King of Moab, in his inscription (Mesha Stele, line 10) says that the Gadites (not the Reubenites) formerly occupied Ataroth, whence he in turn expelled the people of Israel. He mentions (line 26) his having constructed a road along the Arnon. The ancient importance of the river and of the towns in its vicinity is attested by the numerous ruins of bridges, forts, and buildings found upon or near it. Its fords are alluded to by the Book of Isaiah (16:2). Its "heights," crowned with the castles of chiefs, were also celebrated in verse (Numbers 21:28).

=== Hellenistic and Roman periods ===
Wadi Mujib has been identified as a possible location of the Forest of Jardes, mentioned by the first-century historian Josephus in connection with the later stages of the First Jewish Revolt. In 71 CE, one year after the fall of Jerusalem and shortly after the surrender of the fortress at Machaerus, Roman legate Sextus Lucilius Bassus pursued and killed Jewish rebels in the area.

In Roman times, a fort garrisoned by Cohors III Alpinorum, known as Apud Arnona, was situated close to the point where the Via Nova route crossed the Arnon river. One of the river's confluents, Seil Heidan, was known in Roman times as Aidonas.

== Panorama ==
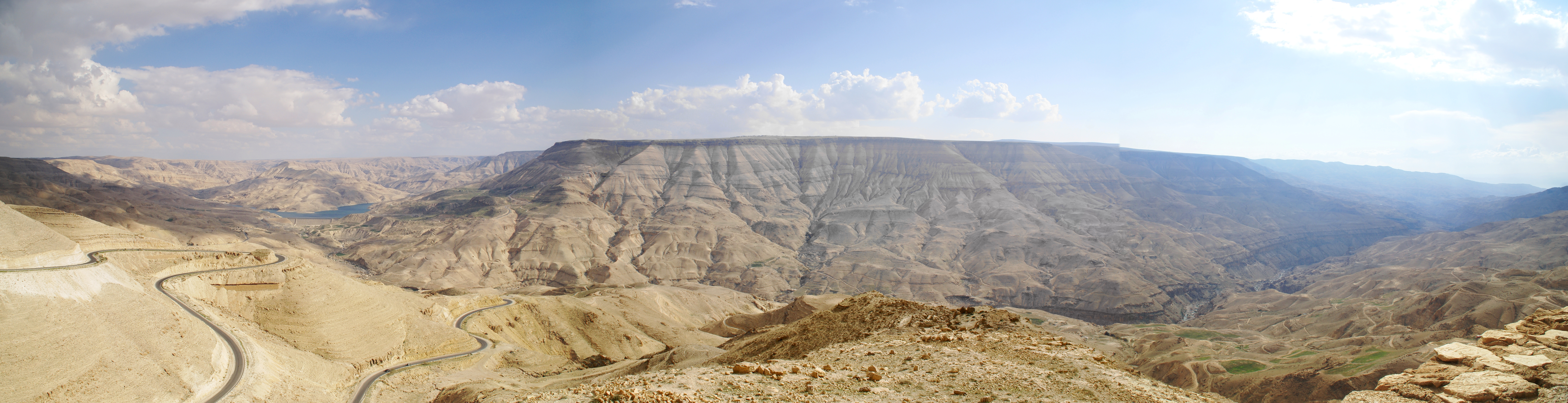
View from a look-out north of the Wadi: 180° panorama image of Wadi Mujib: To the left is the Al Mujib dam (in the background), to the right the Wadi continues towards the Dead Sea. Note the individual sediment layers visible on the walls.

== See also ==
- Dana Biosphere Reserve
- Azraq Wetland Reserve
- Nature Reserves in Jordan
- Wadi Zarqa
