= Tribe of Reuben =

One of the twelve Tribes of Israel

- Map of the twelve tribes of Israel; Reuben's supposed territory is shaded pale green. However, archeological scholars generally agree that Joshua is not a reliable source for reconstructing the history of the period it describes.
- Alternative names: Hebrew: רְאוּבֵן
- Preceded by: New Kingdom of Egypt
- Followed by: Kingdom of Israel (united monarchy)

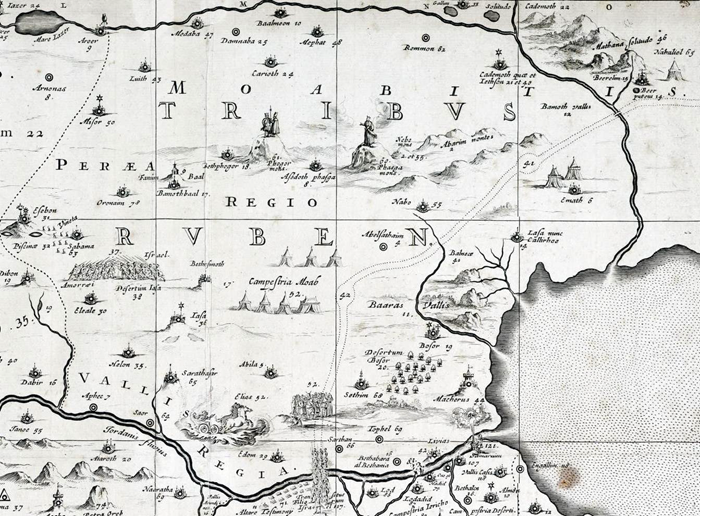
Detailed map of Reuben (Thomas Fuller, 1869; east is at the top)

According to the Hebrew Bible, the Tribe of Reuben (Hebrew: רְאוּבֵן, Modern: Rəʼūven, Tiberian: Rəʼūḇēn) was one of the twelve tribes of Israel. Unlike the majority of the tribes, the land of Reuben, along with that of Gad and half of Manasseh, was on the eastern side of the Jordan and shared a border with Moab. According to the biblical narrative, the Tribe of Reuben descended from Reuben, the eldest son of the patriarch Jacob. Reuben, along with nine other tribes, is reckoned by the Bible as part of the northern kingdom of Israel, and disappears from history with the demise of that kingdom in c. 723 BC.

== Tribal territory ==
The Book of Joshua records that the tribes of Reuben, Gad and half of Manasseh were allocated land by Moses on the eastern side of the Jordan River and the Dead Sea. The Tribe of Reuben was allocated the territory immediately east of the Dead Sea, reaching from the Arnon river in the south, and as far north as the Dead Sea stretched, with an eastern border vaguely defined by the land dissolving into desert; the territory included the plain of Madaba.

The exact border between Reuben and the Tribe of Gad, generally considered to have been situated to the north of Reuben, is somewhat inconsistently specified in the Bible, with Dibon and Aroer being part of Gad according to Numbers 32:34, but part of Reuben according to Joshua 13:15–16. On that basis, the Jewish Encyclopedia (1906) claimed that the territory of Reuben was an enclave in the territory of Gad.

The territories described in Joshua 13 depict Gad as being to the north of Reuben, while the description in Numbers 32 and 34 has Reubenites living near Heshbon, surrounded by Gadites. Yohanan Aharoni interpreted the description in Numbers as referring to the actual distribution of Reubenites and Gadites around the time of David, and the description in Joshua 13 as reflecting administrative districts set up in the time of Solomon, but not reflecting actual tribal settlement patterns. By 900 BC, some of the territory of Reuben and Gad had been captured by the Moabite kingdom.

== Biblical narrative ==
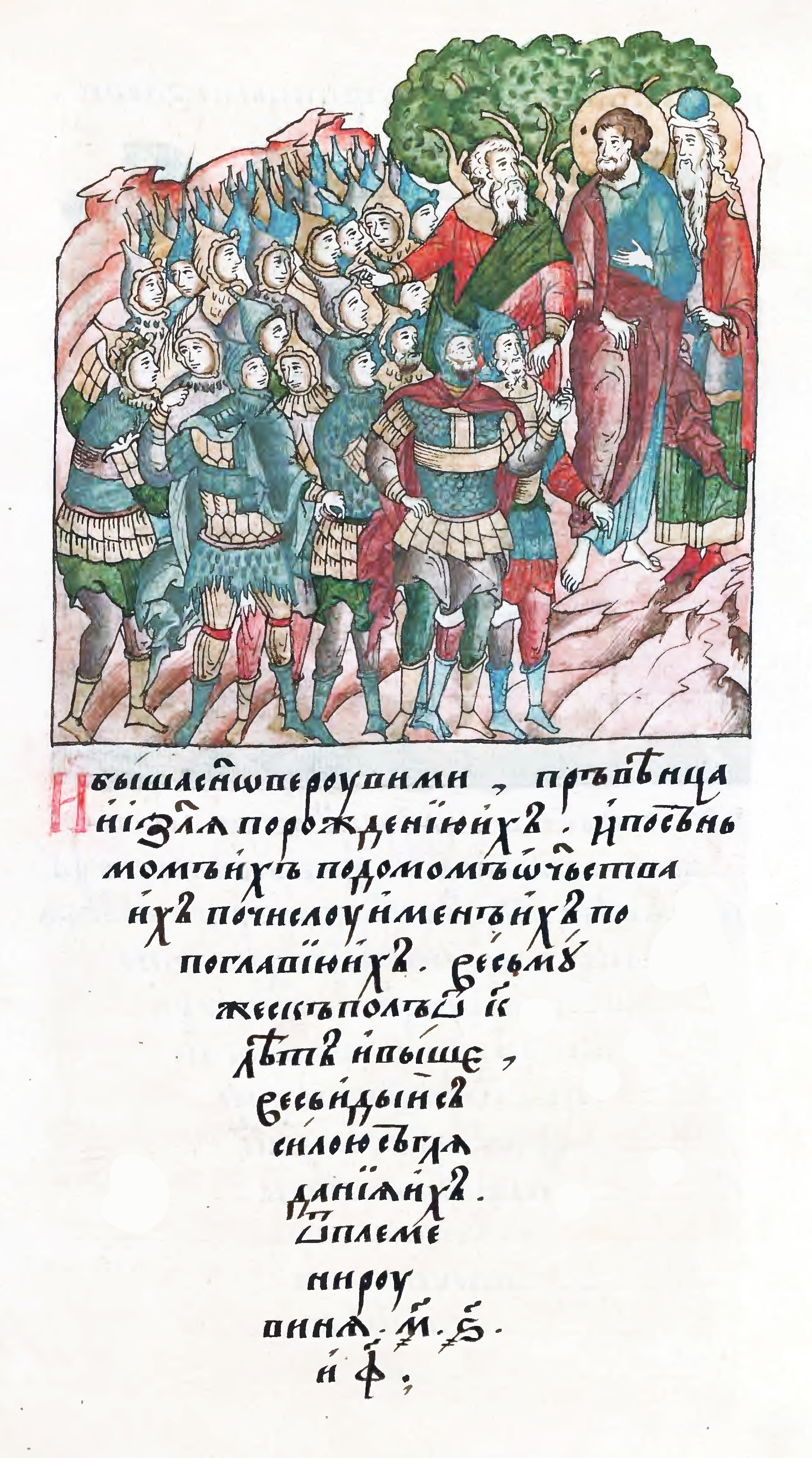
Reuben's family

=== Origins ===
According to the Torah, the tribe consisted of descendants of Reuben, the first son of Jacob, and a son of Leah, from whom it took its name. Modern scholarship views the events described in Genesis and Exodus, which contain the early stories about Jacob and his immediate descendants, as non-historical.

The Bible divides the tribe of Reuben into four clans or families, the Hanochites, Palluites, Hezronites, and Carmites, which according to the Bible were descended from Reuben's sons Hanoch, Pallu, Hazron, and Carmi.

Genesis 49 contains the Blessing of Jacob, a series of predictions which the Bible presents as delivered by the patriarch Jacob about the future fate of the tribes descended from his twelve sons. Some textual scholars date it substantially later than these events. Reuben is characterised as fickle, "unstable as water", and condemned to no longer "have ... the excellency" due to Reuben's crime of having sexual relations with his father's concubine Bilhah.

The Bible relates that Jacob and his twelve sons, along with their sons, went down into Egypt as a group of about seventy persons, including Reuben and his four sons. According to the account in Exodus, the Israelites stayed in Egypt for 430 years, and their numbers grew to include about 600,000 men, not counting women or children. At this point they left Egypt (see The Exodus) and wandered for forty years in the wilderness between Egypt and the promised land of Canaan.

As the tribes prepared to enter Canaan by crossing over to the west side of the Jordan, the Book of Numbers records that the Israelites defeated Sihon and Og, kings east of the Jordan. The tribes of Reuben and Gad requested that they be given land in the territory east of Jordan, because it was suitable for their needs as livestock grazers. In exchange for their promise to help with the conquest of the land west of the Jordan, Moses accepted their request and granted to them and half of Manasseh land east of the Jordan. Following the death of Moses, Joshua became the leader of the Israelites, and with the help of these eastern tribes including Reuben, conquered some of Canaan and assigned the land of Israel to the various twelve tribes.

According to Kenneth Kitchen, this conquest occurred around 1200 BC, but "almost all" scholars have abandoned the idea that Joshua carried out a conquest of Canaan similar to that described in the Book of Joshua. Israel Finkelstein et al., have claimed that lack of evidence for a systematic conquest or the abrupt appearance of a new culture indicates that the Israelites simply arose as a subculture within Canaanite society. The territory of Reuben encapsulated the territory of the earlier kingdom of Sihon.

==== Family tree ====
	Reuben	Eliuram
Hanok	Pallu	Hezron	Karmi

=== Tribal history ===
In this period, according to the ancient Song of Deborah, Reuben declined to take part in the war against Sisera, the people instead idly resting among their flocks as if it were a time of peace, though the decision to do so was taken with a heavy heart.

Nahash appears abruptly as the attacker of Jabesh-Gilead, which lay outside the territory he laid claim to. Having subjected the occupants to a siege, the population sought terms for surrender, and were told by Nahash that they had a choice of death (by the sword) or having their right eyes gouged out. The population obtained seven days' grace from Nahash, during which they would be allowed to seek help from the Israelites, after which they would have to submit to the terms of surrender. The occupants sought help from the people of Israel, sending messengers throughout the whole territory, and Saul, a herdsman at this time, responded by raising an army which decisively defeated Nahash and his cohorts at Bezek.

The strangely cruel terms given by Nahash for surrender were explained by Josephus as being the usual practice of Nahash. A more complete explanation came to light with the discovery of the Dead Sea Scrolls: although not present in either the Septuagint or Masoretic Text, an introductory passage, preceding this narrative, was found in a copy of the Books of Samuel among the scrolls found in cave 4:

[N]ahash, king of Ammonites would put hard pressure on the descendants of Gad and the descendants of Ruben and would gouge everyone's right eye out, but no res(cuer) would be provided for Israel and there was not left anyone among the children of Israel in the Tr(ans Jordan) whose right eye Nahash the king of Ammonites did not gouge out but be(hold) seven thousand men (escaped the power of) Ammonites and they arrived at (Ya)besh Gilead. About a month later Nahash the Ammonite went up and besieged Jabesh-Gilead.

According to the Book of Chronicles, Adina and thirty Reubenites aided David as members of his mighty warriors in conquering the City of David. Also according to Chronicles, during the reign of King Saul Reuben instigated a war with the Hagarites, and was victorious; in another portion of the same text, Reuben is said to have been assisted in this war by Gad and the eastern half of Manasseh.

According to 1 Chronicles 5:26, Tiglath-Pileser III of Assyria (ruled 745–727 BC) deported the Reubenites, Gadites, and the half-tribe of Manasseh to "Halah, Habor, Hara, and the Gozan River."

According to the Moabite Mesha Stele (ca. 840 BCE) the Moabites reclaimed many territories in the second part of the 9th century BCE (only recently conquered by Omri and Ahab according to the Stele). The stele does mention fighting against the tribe of Gad but not the tribe of Reuben, even though taking Nebo and Jahaz which were in the centre in their designated homeland. This would suggest that the tribe of Reuben at this time was no longer recognizable as a separate force in this area. Even if still present at the outbreak of this war, the outcome of this war would have left them without a territory of their own, just like the tribes of Simeon and Levi. This is, according to Richard Elliott Friedman in Who Wrote the Bible?, the reason why these three tribes are passed over in favour of Judah in the J-version of the Jacob's deathbed blessing (composed in Judah before the fall of Israel).

=== Banner ===
The Tribes of Israel had banners described by the Book of Numbers, such the Lion of Judah. Jewish writers have diverged on whether the banner of Reuben bore the symbol of a man or male child (Aben Ezrah), a mandrake, or a child holding a mandrake in his hand.

== See also ==
- Israel
- The Making of the Pentateuch
- Palestine
