= Rujm ash Shara'irah =

Rujm ash Shara'irah رجم الشرائرة
- Location in Jordan
- Coordinates: 32°0′N 35°50′E
- Country: Jordan
- Governorate: Amman Governorate
- Time zone: UTC + 2

Rujm ash Shara'irah is a town in the Amman Governorate of northwestern Jordan. It is located northwest of the capital Amman and off Highway 25.

== See also ==
- Rujm
