= Gilead =

Northern part of the region of Transjordan, also the name of several biblical figures

Gilead: גִּלְעָד; جلعاد; Gilad
- Region
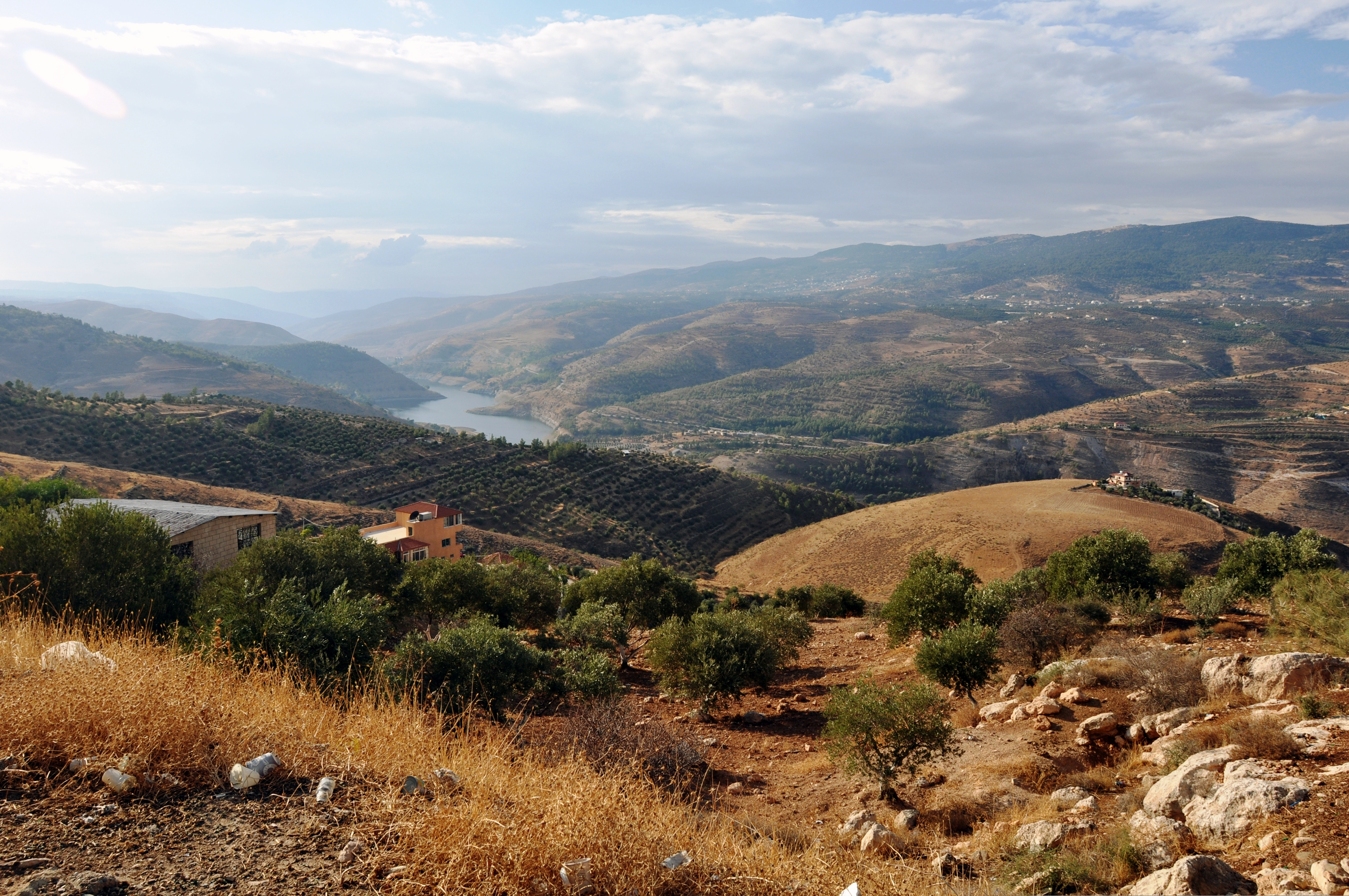
- Gilead around River Zarqa (biblical River Jabbok)

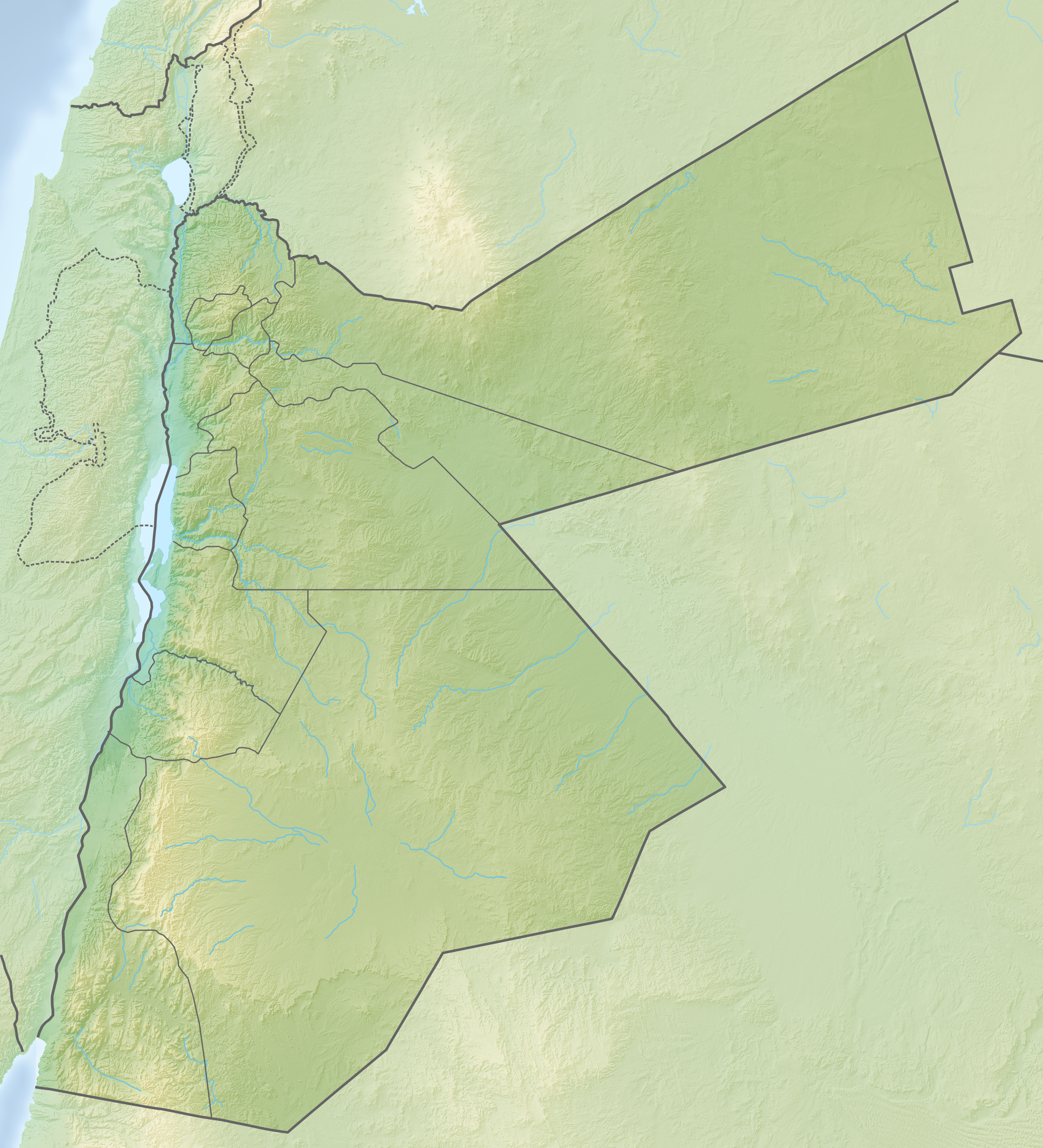
- Location within Jordan
- Coordinates: 32°33′N 35°51′E
- Location: Irbid Governorate, Jordan
- Highest elevation: 1,200 m (3,900 ft) (Maqta' al Qurmeya, Jabal Ajlun)

Gilead (Note: UK: /ˈɡɪliæd/ GHIL-ee-ad, US: /ˈɡɪliəd/ GHIL-ee-əd; Hebrew: גִּלְעָד, romanized: Gilʿāḏ; Arabic: جلعاد, romanized: Jalʿād.) or Gilad is the ancient, historic, biblical name of the mountainous northern part of the region of Transjordan, present-day Jordan. The region is bounded in the west by the Jordan River, in the north by the deep ravine of the river Yarmouk and the region of Bashan, and in the southwest by what were known during antiquity as the "plains of Moab", with no definite boundary to the east. In some cases, "Gilead" is used in the Bible to refer to all the region east of the Jordan River. Gilead is situated in modern-day Jordan, corresponding roughly to the Irbid, Ajloun, Jerash and Balqa Governorates.

== Etymology ==
Gilead is explained in the Hebrew Bible as derived from the Hebrew word גַּלְעֵד galʿêḏ ('cairn'), which in turn comes from gal ('heap, mound, hill') and ʿêḏ ('witness, testimony'). If that is the case, Gilead means 'heap [of stones] of testimony'. There is also an alternative theory that it means 'rocky region'.

From its mountainous character, it is called the Mount or hill-country of Gilead (Genesis 31:25; Song 4:1). It is called also the Land of Gilead (Numbers 32:1, Judges 10:4) in many translations, and sometimes simply Gilead (Genesis 37:25; Judges 10:8; Psalm 60:7), also mentioned in Micah 7:14–15.

== History of the term Gilead ==
=== Hebrew Bible ===
The name Gilead first appears in the biblical account of the final meeting of Jacob and Laban in the Book of Genesis. Laban's entourage camped on Gilead, while Jacob and his family, fleeing from Laban, camped in unnamed hill-country, presumably a neighbouring location. (Note: The Latin Vulgate reads "in eodem monte", meaning "on the same mountain".) Gilead was also referred to by the Aramaic name Yegar-Sahadutha, which carries the same meaning as the Hebrew Gilead, namely "heap [of stones] of testimony".

Later in the biblical narrative, during the Exodus, "half Gilead" was possessed by Sihon, and the other half, separated from it by the river Jabbok, by Og, king of Bashan. After the two Amorite kings were defeated, the region of Gilead was allotted by Moses to the tribes of Gad, Reuben, and the eastern half of Manasseh.

In the Book of Judges, the thirty sons of the biblical judge Jair controlled the thirty towns of Gilead (Judges 10:4), and later the biblical judge Jephthah defeated the Ammonites attempting to retake the former Ammonite territory in Gilead conquered by Moses (Judges 11). In the First Book of Chronicles, Segub controlled twenty-three towns in Gilead (1 Chronicles 2:21–22). It was bounded on the north by Bashan, and on the south by Moab and Ammon (Genesis 31:21; Deuteronomy 3:12–17).

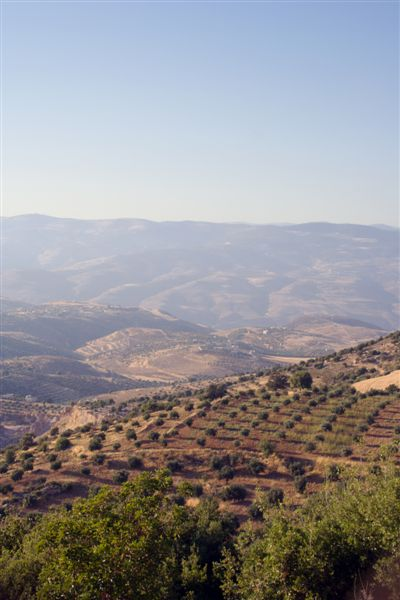
The hills of Gilead, Jordan

"Gilead" mentioned in the Book of Hosea may refer to the cities of Ramoth-Gilead, Jabesh-Gilead, or the whole Gilead region; "Gilead is a city of those who work iniquity; it is stained with blood" (Hosea 6:8).

The kingdoms Ammon and Moab sometimes expanded to include southern Gilead. King David fled to Mahanaim in Gilead during the rebellion of Absalom. Gilead is later mentioned as the homeplace of the prophet Elijah.

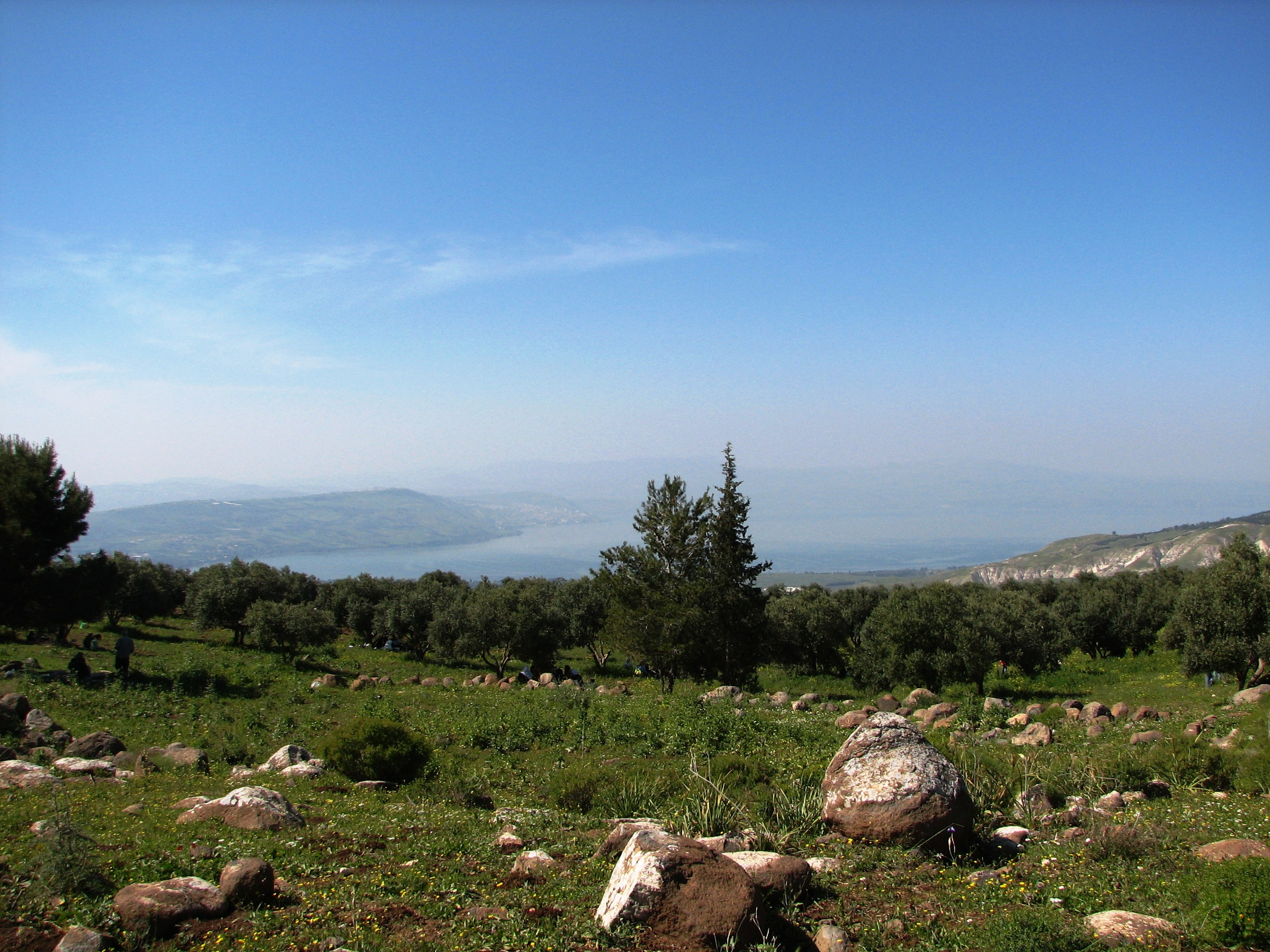
Sea of Galilee as seen from Gilead near Irbid

=== Neo-Assyrian province ===
King Tiglath-Pileser III of Assyria established the province of Gal'azu (Gilead) c. 733 BCE.

=== Arabic ===
In Arabic, "Gilead" (جلعاد, Jalʿād) is a term used to refer to the mountainous land extending north and south of Jabbok. It was used more generally for the entire region east of the Jordan River. It corresponds today to the northwestern part of the Kingdom of Jordan. The region appears in the ancient Safaitic inscriptions.

== More information ==
- Balm of Gilead
- Machir
- Machir (tribal group)
- Shibboleth
- Tribe of Manasseh
- Perea
- Balqa
- Republic of Gilead
