= Aroer =

Biblical town in present-day Jordan

Coordinates: 31.4672°N 35.5633°E

Aroer (Hebrew: עֲרוֹעֵר, עֲרֹעֵר) is the name of two biblical cities in the Transjordan, in what is today the Kingdom of Jordan.

One is Areor on the Arnon, which is located on the north bank of the River Arnon to the east of the Dead Sea, in present-day Jordan. The town was an ancient Moabite settlement, and is mentioned in the Bible. Aroer is identified with the modern village of 'Ara'ir in Jordan.

The second Aroer is an Ammonite town which, according to the Book of Joshua, was located on the border between the Israelite Tribe of Gad and the kingdom of Ammon. However, its precise location has been lost to history.

== Aroer on the Arnon ==
=== Location ===
Henry Baker Tristram suggested that "Aroer, which is on the edge of the valley of Arnon" (Deuteronomy 2:36) is the place of modern 'Ara'ir on the north bank of the Wadi Mujib ravine, the biblical Arnon stream, about 11 miles (18 km) from the mouth of the river. The city was still standing in the time of Eusebius. This place was usually described by its situation, in order to distinguish it from other localities of the same name.

=== Biblical mentions ===
It appears first as having been captured from Moab by the Amorite king Sihon. After the Israelite attack on the Amorites, it was assigned as part of the territory of the tribe of Reuben, whose southern frontier it marked. This is the city mentioned in Numbers 32:34, with the southern towns, as having been built by the Tribe of Gad before the Tribal allotments of Israel. When Hazael of Aram Damascus took the Transjordan territory from the Kingdom of Israel, Aroer is given as its southern limit. It is clear, from Jeremiah 48:19, that the Moabites ultimately recovered it from Israel.

In Joshua 15:22, an Adadah is mentioned. According to Cheyne and Black, arguing partially on the basis of a Septuagint reading of Arouel, this Adadah may in fact be the result of a scribal error, with the text originally reading Ararah, meaning Aroer.

According to a prophecy in the Book of Isaiah, "the cities of Aroer" will become forsaken; however, the Septuagint relates this verse to Damascus in Syria, translating as "deserted for ever" (see Isaiah 17:2).

=== Extra-biblical mention ===
In the Mesha inscription, line 26, it is mentioned as having been built by the Moabites.

== References and sources ==
Sources

- Aroer, Jewish Encyclopædia
