= Mizpah (Moab) =

Mizpah ('watchtower') was either a royal city or fortress in Moab to which David removed his parents for safety during his persecution by Saul (1 Sam. 22:3). Modern day sites suggested as its possible location include Kerak (Kir-Moab) and Rujm el-Meshrefeh in Jordan.

== Bibliography ==
- Walton, John H.; Matthews, Victor Harold; Chavalas, Mark William (8 November 2000). The IVP Bible background commentary: Old Testament (6th, illustrated ed.). InterVarsity Press. ISBN 9780830814190.
