= Rujm =

Arabic place name

Rujm (Arabic: رجم, rûjm; p. rûjûm) is an Arabic word that appears as an element in numerous place names. It can be translated as 'mound, cairn, hill, spur', and also as 'stone heap' or 'tumulus'. The following is a list of place names that include Rujm as an element:

- Kanân Rujm Kûddâh, "the peaks of the cairn of the potter", or of "the flint stone for striking fir"
- Khirbat er Rujm, "the ruin of the stone heap"
- Rujm Abu Ḥashabe
- Rujm Abu Helal, "the cairn of Abu Helal"
- Rujm Abu Meheir (Rujm Abu Muheir), "the cairn of Abu Meheir"
- Rujm Abu Shuweikeh, "the cairn of the thistles"
- Rujm Abu Zumeiter, "the cairn of Abu Zumeiter"
- Rujm Afâneh, "the cairn of rottenness"
- Rujm el 'Ajamy, "the cairn of the Persian"
- Rujm 'Alei, "the cairn of the high place"
- Rujm 'Atîyeh, "the cairn of 'Atiyeh"
- Rujm el 'Azâzimeh, "the cairn of the Azazimeh Arabs"
- Rujm el Bahr, "the cairn of the sea"; a site by the name is on the Dead Sea shore near Jericho
- Rujm el Bakarah "the cairn of the cow"
- Rujm el Bârish, "the cairn of the ground covered with variegated herbiage"
- Rujm Bâruk, "the cairn of Baruk"
- Rujm Beni Yasser, "rujm of the sons of Yasser" (a fortlet of Nabataean origin)
- Rujm Birjis (on the Kerak plateau)
- Rujm ed Debbâbeh, "the cairn of the moveable hut"
- Rujm ed Deir, "the cairn of the monastery"
- Rujm ed Derbi, "the cairn of the roadster"
- Rujm edh Dhib, "the cairn of the wolf"
- Rujm ed Dîr
- Rujm ed Dûribeh, "the cairn of the little road"
- Rujm el Fahjeh, "the cairn of el Fahjeh"
- Rujm el-Farideyyeh
- Rujm Heleiseh, "the cairn of the verdure"
- Rujm Handhal, "the cairn of colocynth"
- Rujm el Heik, "the cairn of the spindle"
- Rujm el-Hamiri, (southeast of Hebron)
- Rujm al-Henu, (Jordan)
- Rujm el Heri, (southeast of Madaba)
- Rujm el-Hiri, "the stone heap of the wild cat"
- Rujm el Humeitah, "the cairn of the mountain fig"
- Rujm el Hummûs, "the cairn of the chick-pea"
- Rujm el Humra, "the red cairn"
- Rujm Ibn Basma, "the cairn of Ibn Basma"
- Rujm Jemảh, "the cairn of the gathering"
- Rujm Jîz, "the cairn on the valley side"
- Rujm Jureideh, "the cairn of the troop"
- Rujm el Kahakîr, "the cairn of the stone heaps"
- Rujm el Kandôl, "the cairn of the thorn tree"
- Rujm el-Khadar
- Rujm el Kherâzmîyeh, "the cairn of the Kharezinians"
- Rujm el Khiâri, "the cairn of the cucumber"
- Rujm el Kurrât, "the stone of the attacks"
- Rujm Kuteit, "the cairn of the cat" or "the cairn of the crag"
- Rujm el Lukâr, "the cairn of Lukâr"
- Rujm Al-Malfouf, "circular towers"
- Rujm (el Mehawâfet) el Kibliyyeh, "the southern cairn (of the boundary)"
- Rujm (el Mehawâfet) esh Shemaliyyeh, "the northern cairn (of the boundary)"
- Rujm el-Merih, (a Nabataean or Late Roman era watchtower located 6 kilometers (3.7 mi) south of Lajjun)
- Rujm el-Meshreferh (in Jordan, associated with Mizpah)
- Rujm el Mogheifir, "the cairn of the pardoned"
- Rujm el Mutukh, "the cairn of the debris"
- Rujm en Nâkeh, (Rujm en-Naqa) "the cairn of the she-camel"
- Rujm en Niâs, "the cairn of en Niyâs
- Rujm en Nûeita, "the cairn of the sailors"
- Rujm en Nūkb, "the cairn of the pass"
- Rujm er Refeif, "the glittering cairn"
- Rujm Reheif, "the sharp-pointed cairn"
- Rujm Reiya, "the cairn of quenching thirst", or "the cairn of sweet fragrance"
- Rujm es S'â, "the cairn of the tax-gatherers"
- Rujm es Sâîgh (Rujm as-Sayigh), "the cairn of the goldsmith"
- Rujm es-Sebit
- Rujm ash Shami
- Rujm ash Shara'irah
- Rujm esh Sheikh Suleimân, "the cairn of Sheikh Suleimân"
- Rujm Shummer, "the cairn of wild fennel"
- Rujm es Sûeif, "the cairn of the little sword"
- Rujm at Tarûd, "the cairn of the projection", or "the cairn of the prominent peak"
- Rujm Umm el 'Arâis, "the cairn of the mother of brides"
- Rujm Umm Kheir, "the cairn of Umm Kheir"
- Rujm Umm es Sata, "the cairn of the mother of the assault"
- Rujm el Waîr, "the cairn of rugged rocks"
- Rujm el Yaklûm, "the cairn of Yaklûm"
- Rujm az-Zuwaira (in Zuwaira al-Fauqa, or Upper Zohar)
- Rŭjûm el Behîmeh, "the cairns of the beast"
- Rujûm Umm Kharrûbeh, "the cairns by the locust tree" (Ceratonia siliqua) (or, "the cairns of the mother of the carob tree")

== See also ==
- Glossary of Arabic toponyms
- Place names of Palestine

== Bibliography ==
- Carter, Charles E. (1999). The emergence of Yehud in the Persian period: a social and demographic study (Illustrated ed.). Continuum International Publishing Group. ISBN 978-1-84127-012-8.
- Lapp, Paul W.; Schaub, R. Thomas; Rast, Walter E. (1989). Bāb edh-Dhrāʻ: excavations in the cemetery directed by Paul W. Lapp (1965-67). EISENBRAUNS. ISBN 978-0-931464-51-5.
- Heinzeller, Thomas; Nebelsick, J. H. (2004). Echinoderms: München (Illustrated ed.). CRC Press. ISBN 978-0-415-36481-2.
- Magness, Jodi (2004). Debating Qumran: collected essays on its archaeology (Illustrated, annotated ed.). Peeters Publishers. ISBN 978-90-429-1314-1.
- Mann, Joel F. (2005). An international glossary of place name elements. Scarecrow Press. ISBN 978-0-8108-5040-8.
- McGovern, Patrick E.; Brown, Robin (1986). The late bronze and early iron ages of central Transjordan, the Baqʻah Valley project, 1977-1981 (Illustrated ed.). UPenn Museum of Archaeology. ISBN 978-0-934718-75-2.
- Negev, Avraham; Gibson, Shimon (2005). Archaeological encyclopedia of the Holy Land (4th, revised, illustrated ed.). Continuum International Publishing Group. ISBN 978-0-8264-8571-7.
- Parker, Samuel Thomas; Betlyon, John Wilson (2006). The Roman frontier in central Jordan: final report on the Limes Arabicus Project, 1980-1989 (Illustrated ed.). Dumbarton Oaks. ISBN 978-0-88402-298-5.
- Pringle, D. (1997). Secular buildings in the Crusader Kingdom of Jerusalem: an archaeological gazetteer, Part 183 (Illustrated ed.). Cambridge University Press. ISBN 978-0-521-46010-1.
- Shatzman, Israel (1991). The armies of the Hasmonaeans and Herod: from Hellenistic to Roman frameworks. Mohr Siebeck. ISBN 978-3-16-145617-6.
- Palestine Exploration Fund (PEF); Stewardson, Henry C. (1838). The Survey of Western Palestine. Printed for the Committee of the Palestine Exploration Fund by Harrison & Sons.
- Stewardson, Henry C. (1888). The Survey of Western Palestine: A General Index (Electronic edition, 2005 ed.).
- Talbert, Richard J. A. (2000). Barrington atlas of the Greek and Roman world: map-by-map directory, Volume 1 (Illustrated ed.). Princeton University Press. ISBN 978-0-691-04945-8.
- Walton, John H.; Matthews, Victor Harold; Chavalas, Mark William (2000). The IVP Bible background commentary: Old Testament (6th, illustrated ed.). InterVarsity Press. ISBN 978-0-8308-1419-0.
