= Rujm el-Hiri =

Stone-age monument in the Golan Heights

- رُجم الهِرّي (Arabic) גלגל רפאים (Hebrew)
- Gilgal Refaim, Galgal Refaim, Rogem Hiri
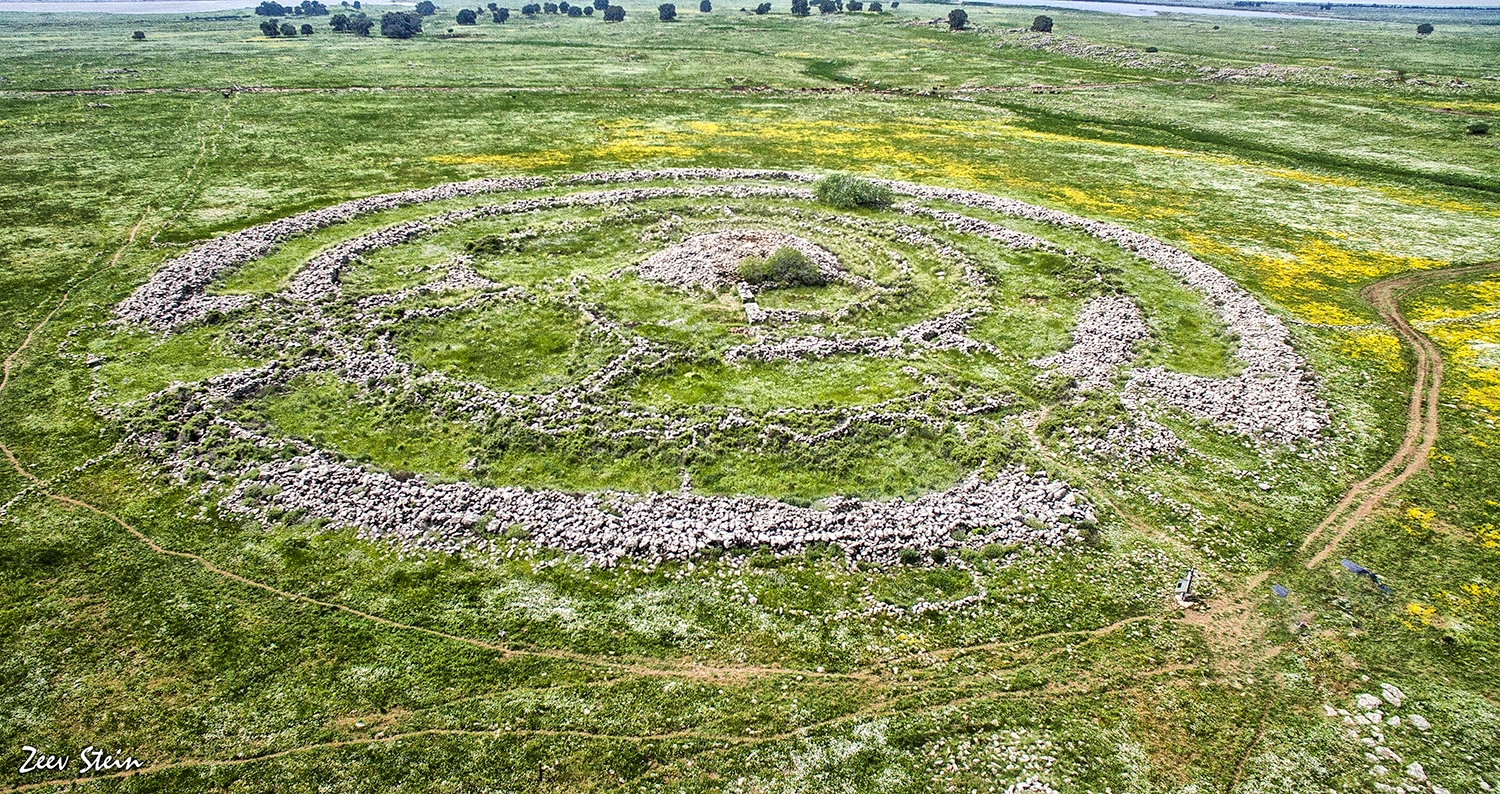
- View of the site

- Location within the Golan Heights
- 32°54′31″N 35°48′04″E
- Location: Golan Heights

Site notes
- Public access: yes

Rujm el-Hiri (Arabic: رجم الهري, romanized: Rujm al-Hīrī) or Gilgal Refaim (Hebrew: גלגל רפאים, romanized: Gilgal Refaʾim), and also known as the Wheel of Giants, is an ancient stone, or megalithic, structure consisting of concentric circles of stone with a tumulus, a mound of earth and stone, at its center. It is located in the Golan Heights some 16 kilometres (9.9 mi) east of the coast of the Sea of Galilee, in the middle of a large plateau covered with hundreds of dolmens, single chamber tombs of stone.

Made up of more than 42,000 basalt rocks arranged in concentric circles, Rujm al-Hiri has a mound 15 feet (4.6 m) tall at its center. Some circles are complete, others incomplete. The outermost wall is 520 feet (160 m) in diameter and 8 feet (2.4 m) high. The establishment of the site, and other nearby ancient settlements, is dated by archaeologists to the Early Bronze Age II period (3000–2700 BCE).

Since excavations have yielded very few material remains, Israeli archeologists theorize that the site was not a defensive position or a residential quarter but most likely a ritual center featuring ritual activity to placate the gods, or possibly linked to the cult of the dead. However, there is no consensus regarding its function, as no similar structure has been found in the Near East.

== Etymology ==
The name Rujm el-Hiri, "stone heap of the wildcat", was originally taken from Syrian maps. The term rujm in Arabic (pl. rujum; Hebrew: rogem) can also refer to a tumulus, a heap of stones underneath which human burial space was located. The name is sometimes romanized as Rujm Hiri or Rujum al-Hiri.

Rogem Hiri is a Modern Hebrew phonetic adaptation of the Arabic name Rujm el-Hiri. A modern Hebrew name used for the site is Gilgal Refaʾim, "Wheel of Spirits" or "Wheel of Ghosts", as refa'im means "ghosts" or "spirits".

== Structure and description ==
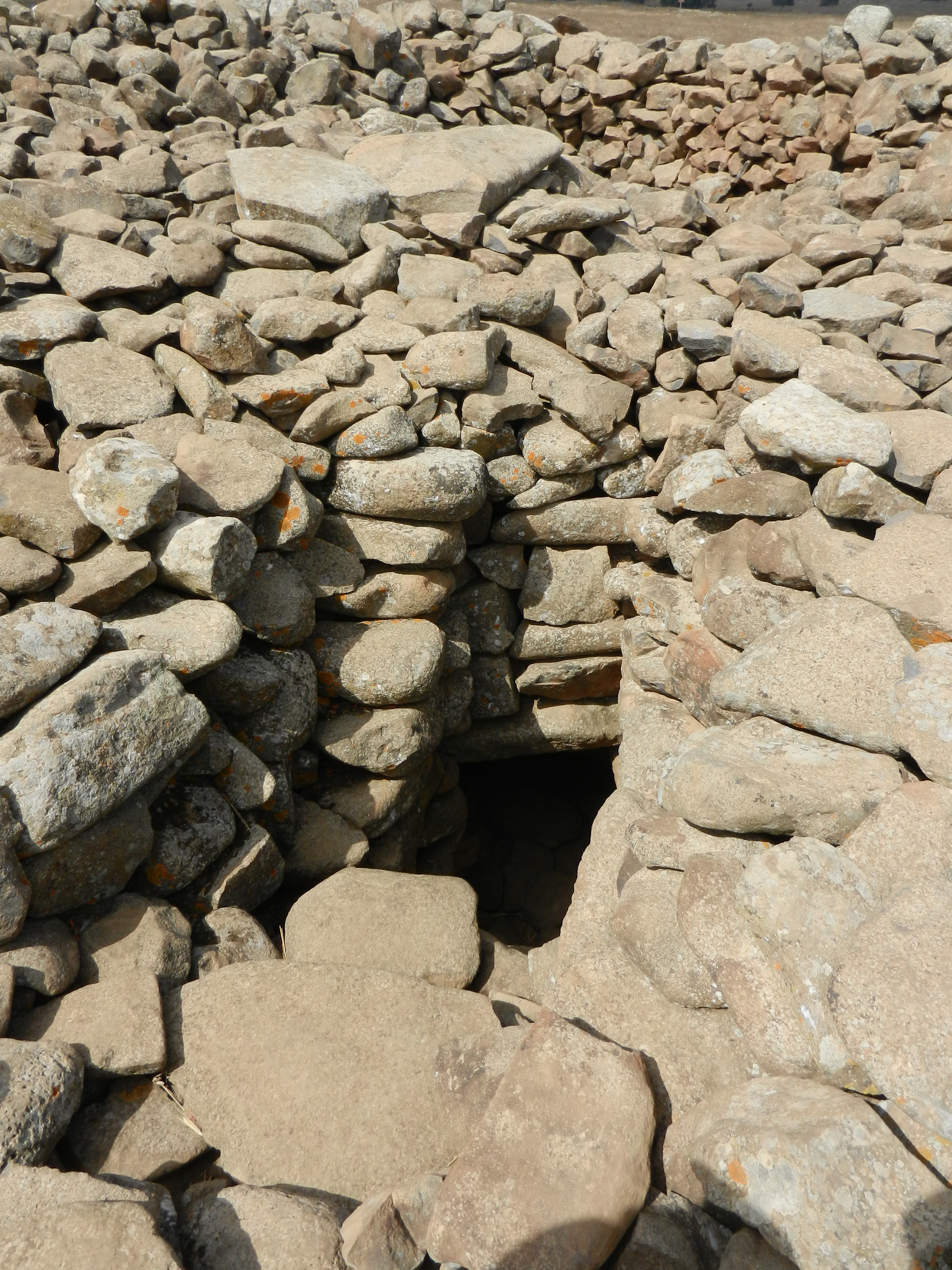
Entrance to burial chamber

The site's size and location, on a wide plateau which is also scattered with hundreds of dolmens, means that an aerial perspective is necessary to see the complete layout. The site was made from basalt rocks, common in the Golan Heights due to the region's history of volcanic activity. It is made from 37,500–40,000 tons of partly worked stone stacked up to 2 meters (6.6 ft) high. M. Freikman estimates that the massive monument would have required more than 25,000 working days to build.

The remains consist of a large circle (slightly oval) of basalt rocks containing four smaller concentric circles, each getting progressively thinner; some are complete, others incomplete. The walls of the circles are connected by irregularly placed smaller stone walls perpendicular to the circles.

The central tumulus is built from smaller rocks and is thought to have been constructed after the surrounding walls. Connecting to it are four main stone walls. The first wall, shaped like a semicircle, is 50 m in diameter and 1.5 m wide. That wall is connected to a second one, an almost complete circle 90 m in diameter. The third wall is a full circle, 110 m in diameter and 2.6 m wide. The fourth and outermost wall is the largest: 150 m in diameter and 3.2 m wide.

A central tumulus 65 feet (20 m) in diameter and 15 feet (4.6 m) high is surrounded by concentric circles, the outermost of which is 520 feet (160 m) in diameter and 8 feet (2.4 m) high. Two entrances to the site face the northeast (29 meters (95 ft) wide) and southeast (26 meters (85 ft) wide). The northeast entrance leads to an accessway 20 feet (6.1 m) long leading to the center of the circle which seems to point in the general direction of the June solstice sunrise. The axis of the tomb discovered at the site's center is similarly aligned.

== Exploration and interpretation ==
=== 1967-1980s ===
The site was cataloged during an archaeological survey carried out in 1967–1968 by Shmarya Guttman and Claire Epstein. The surveyors used Syrian maps, and a Syrian triangulation post was found on top of its cairn. After this initial study, serious archaeological excavations commenced in the 1980s under Israeli professors Moshe Kochavi and Yoni Mizrachi, as part of the Land of Geshur Archaeological Project.

=== After 2000 ===
In 2007, the site was excavated by Yosef Garfinkel and Michael Freikman of the Hebrew University of Jerusalem. Freikman returned in the summer of 2010 for further investigation of the site's date and function.

Freikman believes that the tomb in the center was built at the same time as the rings. Tomb robbers looted the remains, which included jewelry and weapons, but based on the discovery of one Chalcolithic pin dropped in a passageway, Freikman's theory is that the tomb was the centerpiece of the rings.

== Purpose ==
Any astronomical use of the site has been refuted by a study published in November 2024. By disproving any alignment of the structure with important astronomical phenomena such as sun solstices and equinoxes at the time of its construction, this study excludes previous interpretations based on such hypotheses.

=== Legends ===
The site is probably the source of the legends about "a remnant of the giants" or Rephaim of Og.

=== Burial site ===
Ruggles and others wrote that what appeared to them to have been an astronomy-based place of worship (see next paragraph), has later become a burial site for leaders or other important individuals. Supporting this theory was the tomb in the dolmen. However, no human remains were found, only objects pointing to its function as a tomb. They considered at the time that, even if it were a tomb, that was not the site's original function, as they were dating the tomb as being 1,000 years newer than the other structures at the site.

Archaeologist Rami Arav suggests the site was used like the excarnation structures or dakhmas of the Zoroastrians, in which dead persons were laid out for birds to remove the flesh from their bones.

=== Astronomical observation and worship ===
Before the publication of the 2024 study, which refuted any astronomical use of the site (see introduction of this section), several interpretations of Rujm el-Hiri's purpose were based on a presumed alignment of the structure with the sun solstice and equinox.

According to one hypothesis, the site was used for special ceremonies during the longest and shortest days of the year (sun solstices). Until the 2024 study, it was thought that in the year 3000 BCE, on the longest day, the first rays of the sun shone through the opening in the north-east gate, which is 20 by 29 meters. However, they did not shine in a perfect angle. It was assumed this is because the builders did not have sufficiently accurate architectural tools. This interpretation suggests that the residents probably used the site to worship Tammuz and Ishtar, the gods of fertility, to thank them for the good harvest during the year. It was further presumed that after the erection of the tomb in the center, the rays' path was blocked.

Some believe the site was used as an ancient calendar. At the times of the two equinoxes, the sun's rays would pass between two rocks, 2 m in height, 5 m in width, at the eastern edge of the compound. According to an older interpretation presented by Anthony Aveni and Yonatan Mizrachi, the entrance to the center opens on sunrise of the summer solstice. Other notches in the walls indicate the spring and fall equinoxes.

There are also suggestions that the site was used for astronomical observations of the constellations, probably for religious calculations. Researchers found the site was built with dimensions and scales common for other period structures, and partly based on the stars' positions.

== Hiking ==
The Golan Trail, a marked 130-kilometer walking trail that stretches along the whole length of the Golan Heights, passes Gilgal Refa'im.

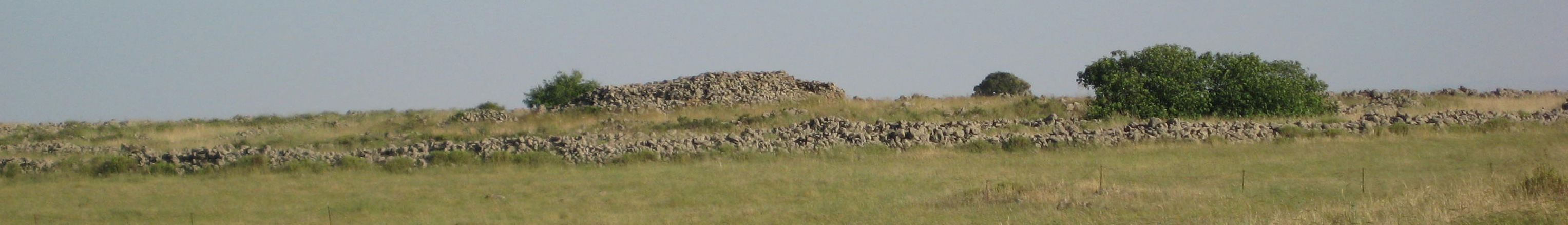
Rujm el-Hiri viewed from ground level

== New Age approach ==
New Age movements advocating a return to nature gather at the site on the June solstice and on the equinoxes to view the first rays of sunlight shine through the rocks.

== See also ==
- Anak
- Atlit Yam, which contains a semi-circle of megaliths, today submerged, with a 6700~6270 BCE destruction date.
- Carahunge
- Levantine archaeology
- Stonehenge
