= Nodab =

Nodab was a Biblical tribe among the Hagarites mentioned only in 1 Chronicles 5:19. They were mentioned as having been conquered by Reuben, Gad and half-Manessah, and little else is known of them.

== See also ==
- Hagarite
