= Tribe of Gad =

One of the twelve Tribes of Israel

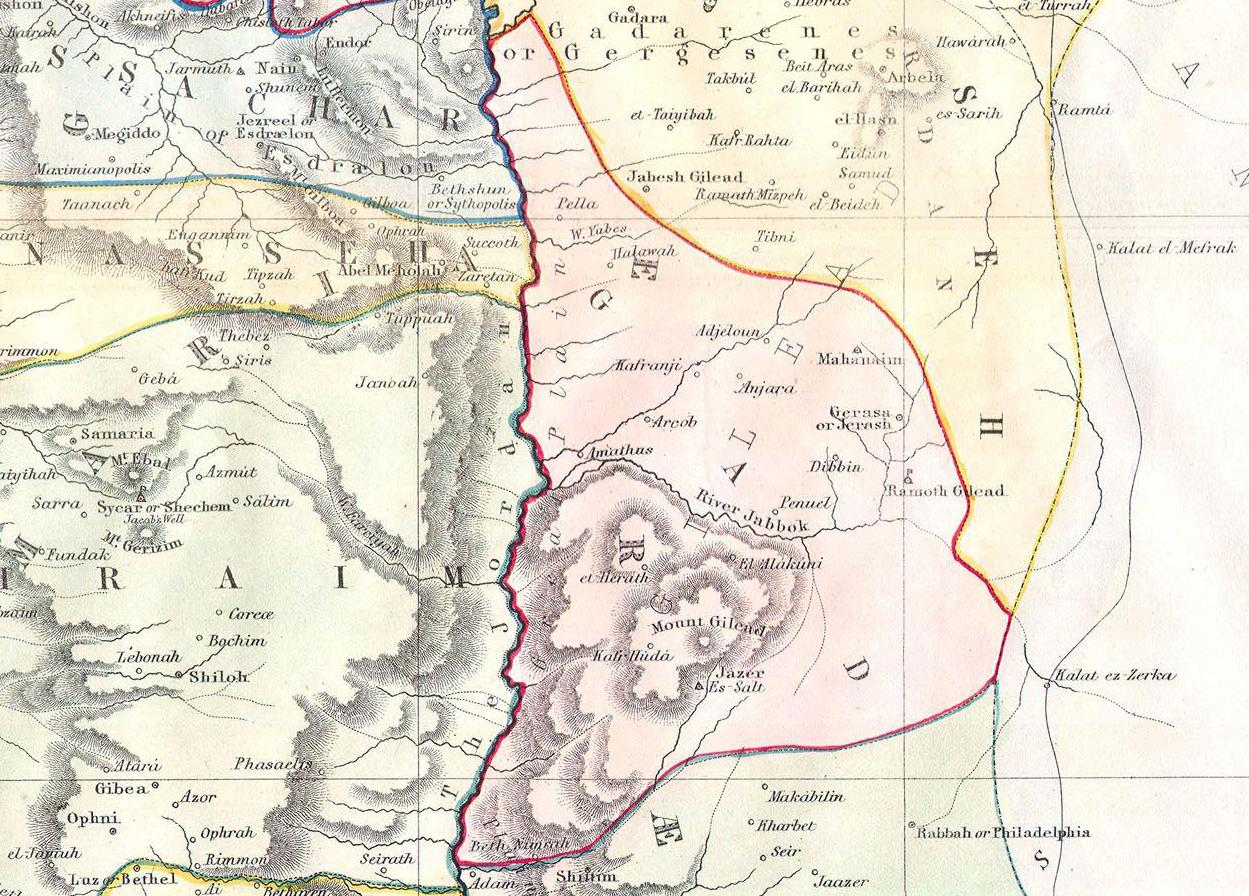
Territory of Gad on an 1852 map

According to the Bible, the Tribe of Gad (Hebrew: גָּד, Modern: Gad, Tiberian: Gāḏ, "soldier" or "luck") was one of the Twelve Tribes of Israel who, after the Exodus from Egypt, settled on the eastern side of the Jordan River. It is one of the ten lost tribes.

== Biblical narrative ==
After the conquest of the land by Joshua until the formation of the first Kingdom of Israel in c. 1050 BC, the Tribe of Gad was a part of a loose confederation of Israelite tribes. No central government existed, and in times of crisis the people were led by ad hoc leaders known as Judges (see the Book of Judges). In the First Book of Samuel, King Nahash of Ammon appears abruptly as the attacker of Jabesh-Gilead, which lay outside the territory he laid claim to. Having subjected the occupants to a siege, the population sought terms for surrender, and were told by Nahash that they had a choice of death (by the sword) or having their right eyes gouged out. The population obtained seven days' grace from Nahash, during which they would be allowed to seek help from the Israelites, after which they would have to submit to the terms of surrender. The occupants sought help from the people of Israel, sending messengers throughout the whole territory, and Saul, a herdsman at this time, responded by raising an army which decisively defeated Nahash and his cohorts at Bezek.

The strangely cruel terms given by Nahash for surrender were explained by Josephus as being the usual practice of Nahash. A more complete explanation came to light with the discovery of the Dead Sea Scrolls: although not present in either the Septuagint or Masoretic Text, an introductory passage, preceding this narrative, was found in a copy of the Books of Samuel among the scrolls found in cave 4:

[N]ahash, king of Ammonites would put hard pressure on the descendants of Gad and the descendants of Ruben and would gouge everyone's right eye out, but no res(cuer) would be provided for Israel and there was not left anyone among the children of Israel in the Tr(ans Jordan) whose right eye Nahash the king of Ammonites did not gouge out but be(hold) seven thousand men (escaped the power of) Ammonites and they arrived at (Ya)besh Gilead. About a month later Nahash the Ammonite went up and besieged Jabesh-Gilead.

With the growth of the threat from Philistine incursions, the Israelite tribes decided to form a strong centralised monarchy to meet the challenge, and the Tribe of Gad joined the new kingdom with Saul as the first king. After the death of Saul, all the tribes other than Judah remained loyal to the House of Saul, but after the death of Saul's son Ish-bosheth, successor to the throne of Israel, the Tribe of Gad joined the other northern Israelite tribes in making Judah's king David the king of a re-united Kingdom of Israel. However, on the accession of David's grandson Rehoboam, in c. 930 BC the northern tribes split from the House of David and from Saul's tribe Benjamin to reform Israel as the Northern Kingdom. Gad was a member of the Northern Kingdom until the kingdom was conquered by Assyria in c. 723 BC and the population deported.

From that time onwards, the Tribe of Gad has been counted as one of the Ten Lost Tribes of Israel.

A genealogy of the "children of Gad" is set out in 1 Chronicles 5:11–17.

=== Tribal territory ===
Map of the tribes of Israel, with Gad shaded green, in the east

Following the completion of the conquest of Canaan by the Israelite tribes after about 1200 BCE, Joshua allocated the land among the twelve tribes. However, in the case of the Tribes of Gad, Reuben and half of Manasseh, Moses allocated land to them on the eastern side of the Jordan River and the Dead Sea (Joshua 13:24–28). The Tribe of Gad was allocated the central region of the three, east of Ephraim and West Manasseh, though the exact location is ambiguous.

"The border was Jazer, and all the cities of Gilead, and half the land of the children of Ammon, unto Aroer that is before Rabbah; and from Heshbon unto Ramath-mizpeh, and Betonim; and from Mahanaim unto the border of Lidbir and in the valley, Beth-haram, and Beth-nimrah, and Succoth, and Zaphon, the rest of the kingdom of Sihon king of Heshbon, the Jordan being the border thereof, unto the uttermost part of the sea of Chinnereth beyond the Jordan eastward."

Among the cities mentioned in Numbers 32:34 as having at some point been part of territory of the Tribe of Gad were Ramoth, Jaezer, Aroer, and Dibon, though some of these are marked in Joshua 13:15–16 as belonging to Reuben.

The location was never secure from invasion and attacks, since to the south it was exposed to the Moabites, and like the other tribes east of the Jordan was exposed on the north and east to Aram-Damascus and later the Assyrians.

== Archaeological evidence ==
Gad is mentioned in the Mesha Stele (ca 840 BCE), where the Moabite king Mesha boast about his conquest of Atoroth (very probably Khirbat Ataruz): "And the men of Gad dwelled in the country of Ataroth from ancient times, and the king of Israel fortified Ataroth". Also Mesha calls his father "Chemosh-gad, king of Moab, the Dibonite", indicating that Dibon was already a major Moabite settlement for a long time (his father having been king for thirty years before him). This shows that in the middle of the 9th century BCE the Moabites still recognized Gad as a separate tribe, and as a part of the kingdom of Israel, but had been pushing them north for a long while (with apparently Dibon taken in the 10th century BCE).

== Origin ==
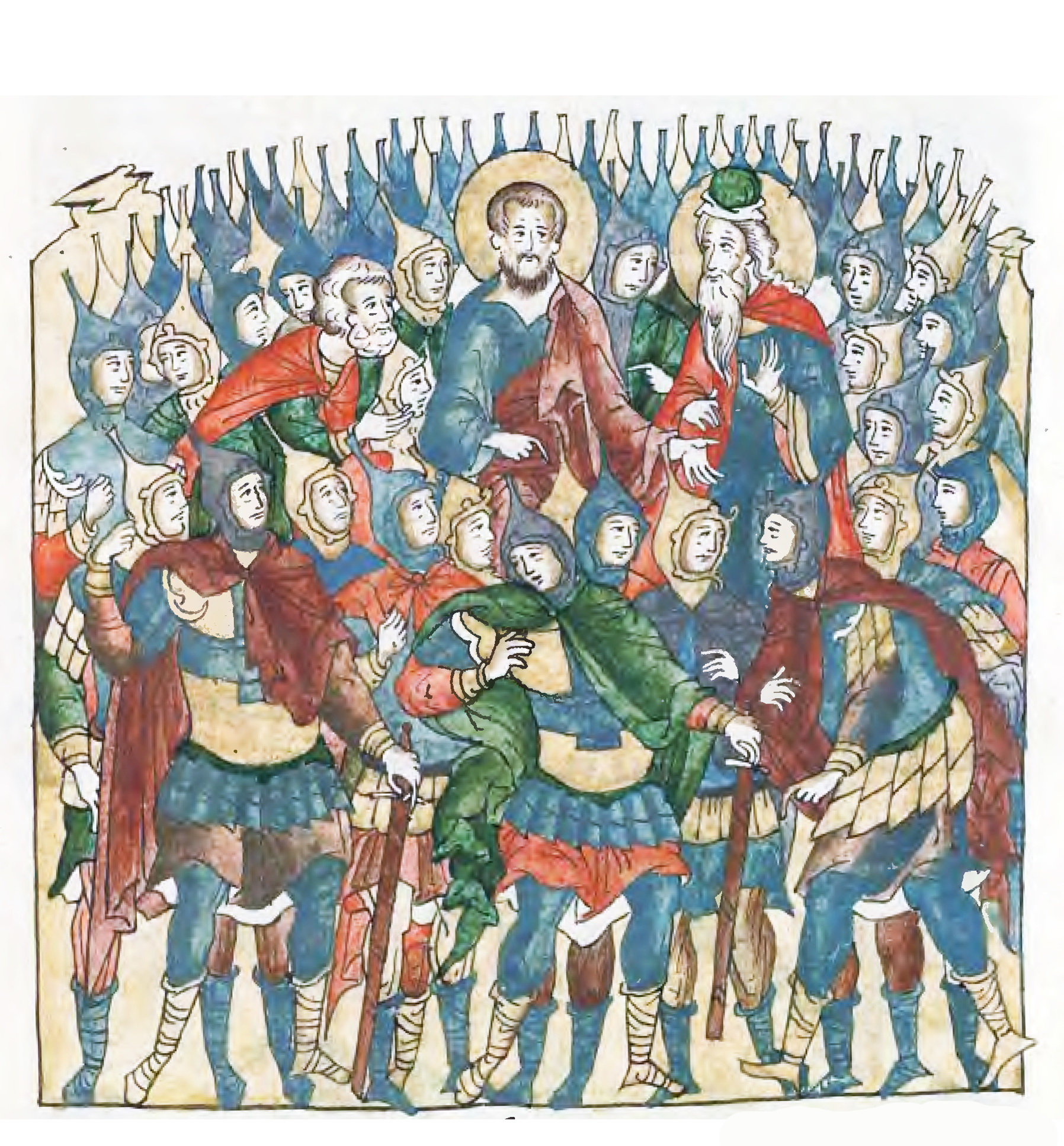
Moses counting Gad's kin

According to the Torah, the tribe consisted of descendants of Gad the seventh son of Jacob, from whom it took its name. However, some Biblical scholars view this also as a postdiction, an eponymous metaphor providing an aetiology of the connectedness of the tribe to others in the Israelite confederation. In the Biblical account, Gad is one of the two descendants of Zilpah, a handmaid of Jacob, the other descendant being Asher; scholars see this as indicating that the authors saw Gad and Asher as being not of entirely Israelite origin (hence descendants of handmaids rather than of full wives). In common with Asher is the possibility that the tribal name derives from a deity worshipped by the tribe, Gad being thought by scholars to be likely to have taken its name from Gad, the semitic god of fortune;

Like Asher, Gad's geographic details are diverse and divergent, with cities sometimes indicated as being part of Gad, and sometimes as part of other tribes, and with inconsistent boundaries, with Gilead sometimes including Gad and sometimes not. Furthermore, the Moabite Stone seemingly differentiates between the kingdom of Israel and the tribe of Gad, saying "the men of Gad dwelled in the country of Ataroth from ancient times, and the king of Israel fortified Ataroth", implicitly presenting Gad as predating Israel in the lands east of the Jordan. These details seems to indicate that Gad was originally a northwards-migrating nomadic tribe, at a time when the other tribes were quite settled in Canaan.

In the biblical account, Gad's presence on the east of the Jordan is explained as a matter of the tribe desiring the land as soon as they saw it, before they had even crossed the Jordan under Joshua, and conquered Canaan. Classical rabbinical literature regards this selection of the other side by Gad as something for which they should be blamed, remarking that, as mentioned in Ecclesiastes, the full stomach of the rich denies them sleep. When they arrived at the Jordan and saw the fertility of the land, they said: "One handful of enjoyment on this side is better than two on the other" (Lev. R. 3:1). However, because they crossed the river to help their brethren in the conquest of Palestine, just as Simeon did when he took his sword and warred against the men of Shechem, they were found worthy to follow the tribe of Simeon at the sacrifices on the occasion of the dedication of the Tabernacle (Num. R. 13. 19). Moses was buried in the territory of Gad (Sotah 13b; Yalkut Shimoni, Vezot Habrachah, sec. 961). According to some, Elijah was a descendant of Gad (Gen. R. 71). The tribes of Gad and Reuben were the first that went into exile (Lam. R. 1:5).

== Fate ==
Though initially forming part of the Kingdom of Israel, from the biblical account it appears that under Uzziah and Jotham the tribe of Gad joined with the kingdom of Judah instead. Nevertheless, when Tiglath-Pileser III annexed the kingdom of Israel in about 733–731 BC, Gad also fell victim to the actions of the Assyrians, and the tribe were exiled; in the Talmud, it is Gad, along with the tribe of Reuben, that are portrayed as being the first victims of this fate. The manner of the exile led to the further history of the tribe being lost, and according to the Book of Jeremiah, their former lands were (re)conquered by the Ammonites.

Ethiopian Jews, also known as Beta Israel, claim descent from the Tribe of Dan, whose members migrated south along with members of the tribes of Gad, Asher, and Naphtali, into the Kingdom of Kush, now Ethiopia and Sudan, during the destruction of the First Temple. The Igbo in Nigeria claim descent from Gad through his son Eri, also the name of their first king.

== See also ==
- Gad (son of Jacob)
