= Sihon =

Amorite king mentioned in the Hebrew Bible

Sihon was an Amorite king mentioned in the Hebrew Bible, king of Ashtaroth, who refused to let the Israelites pass through his country. Chronicled in Numbers, he was defeated by Moses and the Israelites at the battle of Jahaz. He and Og were said to be the two kings Moses defeated on the east side of the Jordan river.

== Biblical accounts ==
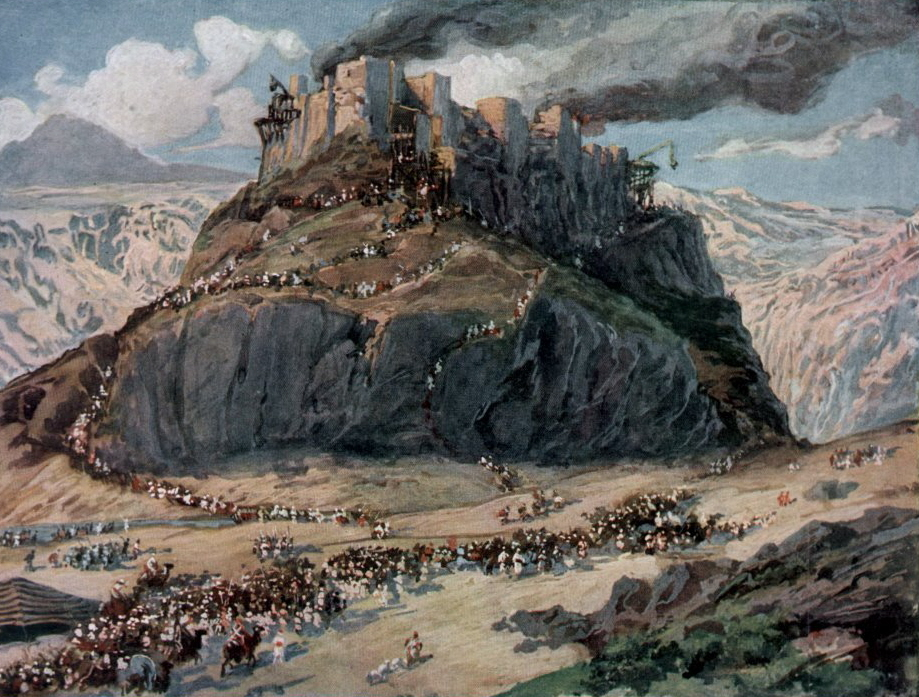
The Conquest of the Amorites (watercolor circa 1896–1902 by James Tissot)

The Book of Numbers recounts that as the Israelites making their the Exodus came to the Transjordan, the country east of the Jordan, near Heshbon, King Siḥon of the Amorites refused to let them pass through his land:

But Sihon would not allow Israel to pass through his territory. So Sihon gathered all his people together and went out against Israel in the wilderness, and he came to Jahaz and fought against Israel. Then Israel defeated him with the edge of the sword, and took possession of his land from the Arnon to the Jabbok, as far as the people of Ammon. (Numbers 21:23-24)

Moses allocated the land of Sihon, the king of Heshbon, to the Tribe of Gad in the allocation of land to the Israelite tribes in Joshua 13:24-28.

In a similar way, the Israelites took the country of Og, and these two victories gave them possession of continuous land in the Transjordan, from the Arnon (Wadi Mujib) to the foot of Mount Hermon. These victories, among the earliest successful campaigns of the Israelites, became legendary among them, and are referred to numerous times in the Hebrew Bible as prototypical examples of God-given victory—for example, in Psalm 135:11 and Psalm 136:19-20.

== Analysis ==
Biblical historian Joel S. Baden has discussed the similarities between the encounter with Sihon and the earlier encounter with the king of Edom (Numbers 20:14–21), as well as a later parallel passage (Deuteronomy 2:2–3:11).
