= Joshua 19 =

Book of Joshua, chapter 19

- ← chapter 18 chapter 20 →
- The pages containing the Book of Joshua in Leningrad Codex (1008 CE).
- Book: Book of Joshua
- Hebrew Bible part: Nevi'im
- Order in the Hebrew part: 1
- Category: Former Prophets
- Christian Bible part: Old Testament
- Order in the Christian part: 6

Joshua 19 is the nineteenth chapter of the Book of Joshua in the Hebrew Bible or in the Old Testament of the Christian Bible. According to Jewish tradition the book was attributed to Joshua, with additions by the high priests Eleazar and Phinehas, but modern scholars view it as part of the Deuteronomistic History, which spans the books of Deuteronomy to 2 Kings, attributed to nationalistic and devotedly Yahwistic writers during the time of the reformer Judean king Josiah in the 7th century BCE. This chapter records the further allotment of land for the tribes of Israel, especially the tribes of Simeon, Zebulun, Issachar, Asher, Naphtali and Dan, as well as Joshua's Inheritance, a part of a section comprising Joshua 13:1–21:45 about the Israelites allotting the land of Canaan.

== Text ==
This chapter was originally written in the Hebrew language. It is divided into 51 verses.

=== Textual witnesses ===
Some early manuscripts containing the text of this chapter in Hebrew are of the Masoretic Text tradition, which includes the Codex Cairensis (895), Aleppo Codex (10th century), and Codex Leningradensis (1008).

Extant ancient manuscripts of a translation into Koine Greek known as the Septuagint (originally was made in the last few centuries BCE) include Codex Vaticanus (B; $\mathfrak{G}$^{B}; 4th century) and Codex Alexandrinus (A; $\mathfrak{G}$^{A}; 5th century). (Note: The whole book of Joshua is missing from the extant Codex Sinaiticus.)

== Analysis ==
Map of the land allotment of the tribes of Israel at the time of Joshua

The narrative of Israelites allotting the land of Canaan comprising verses 13:1 to 21:45 of the Book of Joshua and has the following outline:

A. Preparations for Distributing the Land (13:1–14:15)
B. The Allotment for Judah (15:1–63)
C. The Allotment for Joseph (16:1–17:18)
D. Land Distribution at Shiloh (18:1–19:51)

1. Directions for the Remaining Allotment (18:1–10)
2. Tribal Inheritances (18:11–19:48)

a. Benjamin (18:11–28)
b. Simeon (19:1–9)
c. Zebulun (19:10–16)
d. Issachar (19:17–23)
e. Asher (19:24–31)
f. Naphtali (19:32–39)
g. Dan (19:40–48)

3. Joshua's Inheritance (19:49–50)
4. Summary Statement (19:51)

E. Levitical Distribution and Conclusion (20:1–21:45)

The pattern of the narrative places the distribution to Judah and Joseph preceded by the grant of land to Caleb (14:6–15), while the remaining distribution is followed by an account of an inheritance for Joshua (19:49–50), so the accounts of rewards for the two faithful spies are carefully woven into the story of the land allotments.

There are three key elements in the report of the allotments for the nine and a haf tribes in the land of Canaan as follows:

Tribe	Boundary List	City List	Indigenous Population Comment
Judah	X	X	X
Ephraim	X		X
Manasseh	X		X
Benjamin	X	X	
Simeon		X	
Zebulun	X		
Issachar	X		
Asher	X		
Naphtali	X	X	
Dan		X	X

== Allotment for Simeon (19:1–9) ==
Map of the land allotment of the tribes of Israel at the time of Joshua

The territory of Simeon lay in the semi-arid Negeb, in the south, without a boundary description within the territory of Judah. Even some of its towns also appear in Judah's list (15:21–32). Apparently, the tribal identity of Simeon was lost early in Israel's life, just as the condemnation in Jacob's blessing (Genesis 49:7), pairing Simeon with Levi to be scattered within Israel. The tribe is not mentioned in the Blessing of Moses (Deuteronomy 33) nor in the Song of Deborah (Judges 5), perhaps because of its early failure to settle.

== Allotment for Zebulun, Issachar, Asher, Naphtali (19:10–39) ==
The next allotments are for the tribes of Zebulun, Issachar, Asher, and Naphtali, which form a cluster between the Sea of Galilee and the Mediterranean Sea. From east to west, Issachar, Zebulun, and Asher have southern borders with Manasseh along the line of the Carmel range and the plain of Esdraelon, whereas Naphtali is to the north of Issachar and Zebulun. Among the place names, Mount Tabor appears as a reference point for three of the tribes (verses 12, 22, 34).

=== Verse 15 ===

And Kattath, and Nahallal, and Shimron, and Idalah, and Bethlehem: twelve cities with their villages.

- "Bethlehem": This is a place within the territory of Zebulun in Galilee, not the 'city of David' south of Jerusalem.

== Allotment for Dan (19:40–48) ==
The allotment for the tribe of Dan stands apart from those of the preceding tribes, because here the Danites was originally allotted land in the south, to the west of Judah, running down to the Mediterranean Sea at Joppa (Tel-Aviv), and including certain Philistine territory (Ekron), with some of the place names here are also mentioned in the stories of Samson, a Danite judge, who clashed with the Philistines on the edges of the Shephelah (low hills) and their coastal areas (cf. Judges 13:2, 25; 14:1). The Danites could never have had a strong foothold in this debatable region between the Philistines and Judah, so they finally settled in the extreme north — perhaps the reason for their inclusion here with the Galilean tribes. The 'conquest' of Leshem by this tribe is not grouped as part of Joshua's conquest, and is described more fully in Judges 18, where the slaughter of inhabitants of Leshem (Laish) is implicitly criticized (Judges 18:27). The summary in 19:48 apparently refers to the places enumerated in the original territory (nothing in verse 47 would correspond to 'these towns with their villages'), so Dan's 'inheritance' was not actually 'inherited'.

== Joshua's inheritance and summary of allotments (19:49–51) ==
Joshua's personal inheritance (19:49–50) at the end of land distribution corresponds to that of Caleb the other courageous spy at the start of the distribution (Joshua 14:6–15). There is also an equilibrium that Caleb inherits in (southern) Judah, while Joshua inherits in (northern) Ephraim. The conclusion (19:51) returns to Shiloh and the tent of meeting, again emphasizing the place as the spiritual center of the land, representing God's hand in the distribution. Once more Joshua and Eleazar are named as jointly responsible for the execution (cf. 14:1; cf. Numbers 26:1–4; 52–56).

== See also ==
- Canaanites
- Children of Israel
- Jordan River
- Levite
- Tribe of Asher
- Tribe of Benjamin
- Tribe of Dan
- Tribe of Ephraim
- Tribe of Issachar
- Tribe of Joseph
- Tribe of Judah
- Tribe of Manasseh
- Tribe of Naphtali
- Tribe of Simeon
- Tribe of Zebulun
- Tribal allotments of Israel
- Related Bible parts: Deuteronomy 12, Joshua 11, Joshua 15, Joshua 16, 1 Samuel 1

== Sources ==
- Beal, Lissa M. Wray (2019). Longman, Tremper III; McKnight, Scot (eds.). Joshua. The Story of God Bible Commentary. Zondervan Academic. ISBN 978-0310490838.
- Coogan, Michael David (2007). Coogan, Michael David; Brettler, Marc Zvi; Newsom, Carol Ann; Perkins, Pheme (eds.). The New Oxford Annotated Bible with the Apocryphal/Deuterocanonical Books: New Revised Standard Version, Issue 48 (Augmented 3rd ed.). Oxford University Press. ISBN 978-0195288810.
- Firth, David G. (2021). Joshua: Evangelical Biblical Theology Commentary. Evangelical Biblical Theology Commentary (EBTC) (illustrated ed.). Lexham Press. ISBN 9781683594406.
- Halley, Henry H. (1965). Halley's Bible Handbook: an abbreviated Bible commentary (24th (revised) ed.). Zondervan Publishing House. ISBN 0-310-25720-4.
- Harstad, Adolph L. (2004). Joshua. Concordia Publishing House. ISBN 978-0570063193.
- Hayes, Christine (2015). Introduction to the Bible. Yale University Press. ISBN 978-0300188271.
- Hubbard, Robert L (2009). Joshua. The NIV Application Commentary. Zondervan. ISBN 978-0310209348.
- McConville, Gordon (2007). "9. Joshua". In Barton, John; Muddiman, John (eds.). The Oxford Bible Commentary (first (paperback) ed.). Oxford University Press. pp. 158–176. ISBN 978-0199277186.
- Rösel, Hartmut N. (2011). Joshua. Historical commentary on the Old Testament. Vol. 6 (illustrated ed.). Peeters. ISBN 978-9042925922.
- Webb, Barry G. (2012). The Book of Judges. New International Commentary on the Old Testament. Eerdmans Publishing Company. ISBN 9780802826282.
- Würthwein, Ernst (1995). The Text of the Old Testament. Translated by Rhodes, Erroll F. Grand Rapids, MI: Wm. B. Eerdmans. ISBN 0-8028-0788-7.
