= Joshua 18 =

Book of Joshua, chapter 18

- ← chapter 17 chapter 19 →
- The pages containing the Book of Joshua in Leningrad Codex (1008 CE).
- Book: Book of Joshua
- Hebrew Bible part: Nevi'im
- Order in the Hebrew part: 1
- Category: Former Prophets
- Christian Bible part: Old Testament
- Order in the Christian part: 6

Joshua 18 is the eighteenth chapter of the Book of Joshua in the Hebrew Bible or in the Old Testament of the Christian Bible. According to Jewish tradition the book was attributed to Joshua, with additions by the high priests Eleazar and Phinehas, but modern scholars view it as part of the Deuteronomistic History, which spans the books of Deuteronomy to 2 Kings, attributed to nationalistic and devotedly Yahwistic writers during the time of the reformer Judean king Josiah in 7th century BCE. This chapter records the further allotment of land for the tribes of Israel, especially the tribe of Benjamin, a part of a section comprising Joshua 13:1–21:45 about the Israelites allotting the land of Canaan.

== Text ==
This chapter was originally written in the Hebrew language. It is divided into 28 verses.

=== Textual witnesses ===
Some early manuscripts containing the text of this chapter in Hebrew are of the Masoretic Text tradition, which includes the Codex Cairensis (895), Aleppo Codex (10th century), and Codex Leningradensis (1008).

Extant ancient manuscripts of a translation into Koine Greek known as the Septuagint (originally was made in the last few centuries BCE) include Codex Vaticanus (B; $\mathfrak{G}$^{B}; 4th century) and Codex Alexandrinus (A; $\mathfrak{G}$^{A}; 5th century). (Note: The whole book of Joshua is missing from the extant Codex Sinaiticus.)

== Analysis ==
Map of the land allotment of the tribes of Israel at the time of Joshua

The narrative of Israelites allotting the land of Canaan comprising verses 13:1 to 21:45 of the Book of Joshua and has the following outline:

A. Preparations for Distributing the Land (13:1–14:15)
B. The Allotment for Judah (15:1–63)
C. The Allotment for Joseph (16:1–17:18)
D. Land Distribution at Shiloh (18:1–19:51)

1. Directions for the Remaining Allotment (18:1–10)
2. Tribal Inheritances (18:11–19:48)

a. Benjamin (18:11–28)
b. Simeon (19:1–9)
c. Zebulun (19:10–16)
d. Issachar (19:17–23)
e. Asher (19:24–31)
f. Naphtali (19:32–39)
g. Dan (19:40–48)

3. Joshua's Inheritance (19:49–50)
4. Summary Statement (19:51)

E. Levitical Distribution and Conclusion (20:1–21:45)

The pattern of the narrative places the distribution to Judah and Joseph preceded by the grant of land to Caleb (14:6–15), while the remaining distribution is followed by an account of an inheritance for Joshua (19:49–50), so the accounts of rewards for the two faithful spies are carefully woven into the story of the land allotments.

There are three key elements in the report of the allotments for the nine and a half tribes in the land of Canaan as follows:

Tribe	Boundary List	City List	Indigenous Population Comment
Judah	X	X	X
Ephraim	X		X
Manasseh	X		X
Benjamin	X	X	
Simeon		X	
Zebulun	X		
Issachar	X		
Asher	X		
Naphtali	X	X	
Dan		X	X

== Directions for the remaining allotment (18:1–10) ==
Map of the land allotment of the tribes of Israel at the time of Joshua

In the beginning of this chapter it is reported that the Tabernacle or "tent of meeting" was set up in Shiloh (18:1). Thus, it replaced Gilgal and Shechem which were the gathering centers for Israel until this time. The introduction of Shiloh at this point is not incidental, as its centrality is indicated in an artistic way by placing the text between the allotments of land to Judah and Joseph on the one side, and the remaining tribes on the other. Shiloh also lies within the territory of Joseph tribes, which are recorded in the previous chapters. The central worship place has not been mentioned much until now (only a reference to the 'altar of the LORD' and 'the place that he would choose' in Joshua 9:27), so the setting up of the Tabernacle in Shiloh becomes an important concept of the narrative as the fulfilment of the promise-command that God would be among Israel in the land he was giving them (Leviticus 26:11–12: 'place my dwelling [tent, tabernacle] in your midst': Deuteronomy 12:5). Shiloh starts to play important role in the distribution of the remaining land (verses 2–9; and reappears in 19:51) and thus binding up with Israel's religious life. After the completion of allotments for the tribes of Reuben, Gad, Judah, Ephraim, and Manasseh (the division of Joseph into Ephraim and Manasseh compensates for the Levi who has no territorial inheritance; Joshua 18:7), seven tribes were still to receive their land (verse 2). This stage of the allocation is preceded by a survey (literary, "writing"; verse 4), then in Shiloh, Joshua presided over the allocation by means of the sacred lot, 'before the LORD our God' (verse 6, cf. verses 8, 10, Joshua 14:1.

=== Verse 1 ===
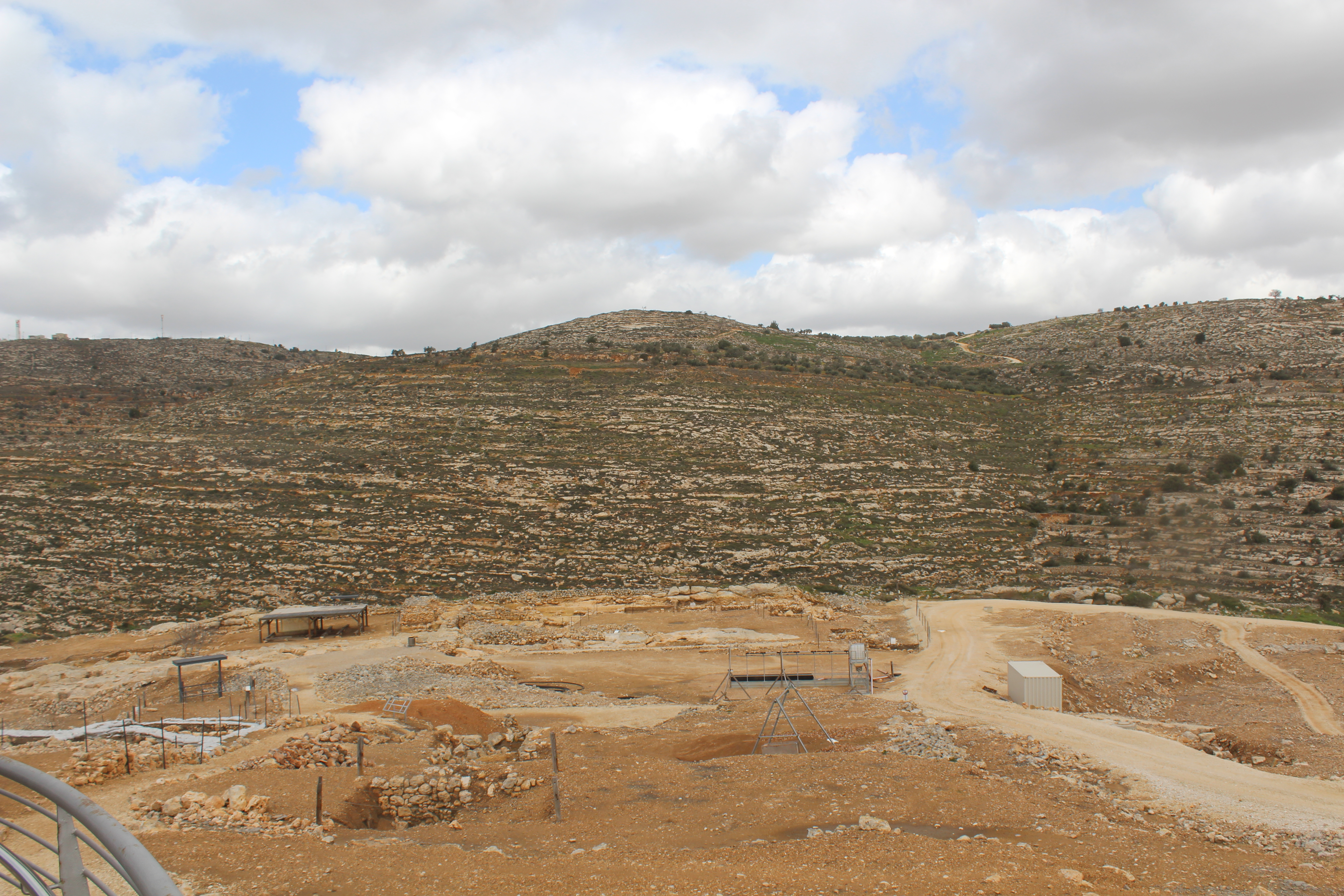
Presumed location of the Tabernacle at Shiloh

And the whole congregation of the children of Israel assembled together at Shiloh, and set up the tabernacle of the congregation there.
And the land was subdued before them.

Passages throughout the Hebrew Bible confirm that Shiloh was once an important sanctuary for Israel before the temple was built in Jerusalem, such as in 1 Samuel 1–2 ('house of the LORD', 1 Samuel 1:24, and the 'tent of meeting' ('tabernacle of the congregation'), 1 Samuel 2:22, as in here); and also named as 'the place of God's choice' in Jeremiah 7:12, following Deuteronomy 12 (cf. Joshua 22).

== Allotment for Benjamin (18:11–28) ==
The territory of Benjamin was allotted between those of Ephraim (in its north; 18:12–14; cf. 16:1-3), and Judah (in its south; 18:15–19; cf. 15:8–11). The list of towns in the allotment (verses 21–28) includes Jebus (Jerusalem), although it was clearly stated that the city did not fall to Joshua (Joshua 15:63). It also includes Gibeon and its satellites (cf. 9:17), without mentioning their special status (Joshua 9) or Israel's battle to defend it (Joshua 10).

== See also ==
- Canaanites
- Children of Israel
- Jebusite
- Jericho
- Jordan River
- Kohen
- Levite
- Moses
- Tabernacle
- Tribe of Benjamin
- Tribe of Ephraim
- Tribe of Gad
- Tribe of Joseph
- Tribe of Judah
- Tribe of Manasseh
- Tribe of Reuben
- Tribal allotments of Israel
- Related Bible parts: Deuteronomy 12, Joshua 11, Joshua 15, Joshua 16, 1 Samuel 1

== Sources ==
- Beal, Lissa M. Wray (2019). Longman, Tremper III; McKnight, Scot (eds.). Joshua. The Story of God Bible Commentary. Zondervan Academic. ISBN 978-0310490838.
- Coogan, Michael David (2007). Coogan, Michael David; Brettler, Marc Zvi; Newsom, Carol Ann; Perkins, Pheme (eds.). The New Oxford Annotated Bible with the Apocryphal/Deuterocanonical Books: New Revised Standard Version, Issue 48 (Augmented 3rd ed.). Oxford University Press. ISBN 978-0195288810.
- Firth, David G. (2021). Joshua: Evangelical Biblical Theology Commentary. Evangelical Biblical Theology Commentary (EBTC) (illustrated ed.). Lexham Press. ISBN 9781683594406.
- Halley, Henry H. (1965). Halley's Bible Handbook: an abbreviated Bible commentary (24th (revised) ed.). Zondervan Publishing House. ISBN 0-310-25720-4.
- Harstad, Adolph L. (2004). Joshua. Concordia Publishing House. ISBN 978-0570063193.
- Hayes, Christine (2015). Introduction to the Bible. Yale University Press. ISBN 978-0300188271.
- Hubbard, Robert L (2009). Joshua. The NIV Application Commentary. Zondervan. ISBN 978-0310209348.
- McConville, Gordon (2007). "9. Joshua". In Barton, John; Muddiman, John (eds.). The Oxford Bible Commentary (first (paperback) ed.). Oxford University Press. pp. 158–176. ISBN 978-0199277186.
- Rösel, Hartmut N. (2011). Joshua. Historical commentary on the Old Testament. Vol. 6 (illustrated ed.). Peeters. ISBN 978-9042925922.
- Webb, Barry G. (2012). The Book of Judges. New International Commentary on the Old Testament. Eerdmans Publishing Company. ISBN 9780802826282.
- Würthwein, Ernst (1995). The Text of the Old Testament. Translated by Rhodes, Erroll F. Grand Rapids, MI: Wm. B. Eerdmans. ISBN 0-8028-0788-7.
