= Blessing of Moses =

Prophetic poem in the Hebrew Bible

The Blessing of Moses is the name given to a prophetic poem that appears in Deuteronomy 33:2–27, where it is presented as a blessing of the Tribes of Israel by Moses. The poem thus shares its theme with the Blessing of Jacob. The Blessing of Moses contains few blessings, most of the verses describing the condition of the tribes at a later time.

Verse 33:2 is often referred to as "one of the most difficult cruces in the Bible."

== Biblical narrative ==
Moses begins with praise of YHWH, who had revealed himself to his beloved nation, and then passes on to the blessing of the different tribes. He mentions first the tribes of the south, beginning with Reuben and Judah, and then those of the north, Dan, Naphtali, and Asher. Regarding the tribe of Reuben, there is only a prayer: "May Reuben live and not die, / Though few be his numbers." (verse 6). The tribe of Simeon seems to be omitted, but this is explained by Joshua 19:1: "The portion of the tribe of the Simeonites, by their clans, lay inside the portion of the Judahites." For Judah, Moses prays that the Lord may hear his voice, and aid him against his enemies (verse 7).

Next comes a lengthy laudation of the tribe of Levi. After a reference to himself with the words "Who said of his father and mother, / 'I consider them not.'", cf. Exodus 32:26–30, Moses declares that this tribe shall be the teachers of the Law and the priestly representatives of Israel before YHWH. The tribe of Benjamin is next blessed as the beloved of YHWH, "He rests securely beside [God], / Who protects him always, / As he rests between God’s shoulders." (verse 12).

By far the greatest attention is given to the tribe of Joseph:

Blessed of יהוה be his land

With the bounty of dew from heaven,
And of the deep that couches below;
With the bounteous yield of the sun,
And the bounteous crop of the moons;
With the best from the ancient mountains,
And the bounty of hills immemorial;
With the bounty of earth and its fullness,
And the favor of the Presence in the Bush.
May these rest on the head of Joseph,
On the crown of the elect of his brothers.
Like a firstling bull in his majesty,
He has horns like the horns of the wild-ox;
With them he gores the peoples,

The ends of the earth one and all.

Mount Tabor and the sandy shore and seacoast figure forth the happiness of the tribes of Issachar and Zebulun (verses 18–19). Gad is as strong as a lion; he selected the land which was to be the last home of the legislator of Israel (verses 20–21; cf. Numbers 32).

Moses then mentions the northern and the last three tribes of Israel. Dan is the lion which leaps from Bashan (verse 22; see Judges 18:1–3, 27, 29; Joshua 19:47–48). Naphtali, whose possessions are to the west and the south, is filled with the blessing of YHWH (comp. Joshua 19:32–39). Last of all comes Asher: "May he be the favorite of his brothers, / May he dip his foot in oil. / May your doorbolts be iron and copper, / And your security last all your days." (verses 24–25).

Finally is the Jeshurun, protected by the chariot-riding YHWH. Here the prophet returns to the opening words of the blessing, praising YHWH and proclaiming the glory and honor of Israel.

== Critical view ==
According to the modern documentary hypothesis the poem was an originally separate text, that was inserted by the Deuteronomist into the second edition (of two) of the text which became Deuteronomy (i.e. was an addition in 'Dtr2').

The poem notably does not describe Simeon, which may provide a date for the composition of the poem, as Simeon are believed to have gradually lost their tribal identity, since its traditional territory was wholly within that of Judah. The poem also only mentions each tribe briefly, except for the tribes of Joseph and Levi, which may indicate both that the poem originated within the Levite priesthood, within the territory of the Joseph tribes, or more generally the northern kingdom of Israel where Ephraim, part of the Joseph tribe, was the most prominent.

It is difficult to establish the connection of the blessing of Moses with that of Jacob. Most authorities maintain that the former depended directly upon the latter; and their chief argument is based on the passage on Joseph, part of which is contained also in Jacob's blessing. But there can hardly be a doubt (says the JE) that the passage on Joseph in Jacob's blessing was amplified from the material contained in the blessing of Moses. Otherwise a similar argument might be based upon the same arrangement in each blessing of the tribes of Zebulun and Issachar, and upon other points of agreement which, however, indicate a similarity of the matter rather than any direct connection.

=== Dubious verses ===
The blessing of Moses, like Jacob's blessing, contains only a few benedictions, most of the verses describing the condition of the tribes at the time of the author. Like the text of Jacob's blessing, the text of these verses is not intact: the beginning (verses 2 and 3) has suffered "much mutilation"; and even with the help of the versions it is impossible to fill the gap. Perhaps the introduction and the conclusion were not written by the author of the blessing itself. Steuernagel, in his commentary on Deuteronomy, points out that the transition from verse 5 to verse 6 and from verse 25 to verse 26 is very abrupt, and that the contents of the introduction and the conclusion are of an entirely different nature from that of the other verses. Verses 26 et seq. seem to connect with verse 5; and the assumption is natural that the benedictory verses were later insertions. Verses 9 and 10 presumably were also the work of a later author.

=== Probable date of origin ===
Scholars have reached no agreement as to when the Blessing of Moses was written: proposals range from the eleventh century at the earliest to as late as the sixth century.

The Jewish Encyclopedia (1906) calls it certain that the blessing of Moses is of later date than the kernel of Jacob's blessing. While in the latter Simeon and Levi (compare Genesis 34) are censured on account of their sin and are threatened with dispersion in Israel (Gen. 49:5-7), the blessing of Moses does not mention Simeon at all; and in it Levi appears as the tribe of priests, although not yet assured of the sacerdotal office, nor respected for holding it. Rather he meets with persecutions, and these probably from the persons who dispute his right to the priesthood (Deuteronomy 33:8ff). While in Jacob's blessing Reuben is threatened with the loss of his birthright, the wish is expressed in the other blessing: "May Reuben live, and not die; and may not his men be few." This is a clear indication that Reuben before this time had sunk into a state of absolute insignificance. And while again the passage on Joseph in the one designates a period in which this tribe successfully defended itself against its enemies, the corresponding passage in the other (Gen. 49:22ff) points to a time when Ephraim maintained his power undiminished and defeated his enemies on all sides: "His [Joseph's] glory is like the firstling of his bullock, and his horns are like the horns of unicorns: with them he shall push the people together to the ends of the earth" (Deut. 33:17). This verse certainly refers to a later time than the Syrian wars under Ahab. It more probably refers to the time of Jeroboam II, who was more successful than any of his predecessors in defeating Israel's enemies. It is likely that the passage on Gad alludes to the same period, in which this tribe successfully withstood the Syrians.

August Dillmann's statement (in his Commentary on Numbers and Deuteronomy, p. 415) that the blessing of Judah points to the period immediately after the separation of the two kingdoms is "hardly correct" (JE). He bases his opinion on the fact that the praise of Levi and Benjamin, together with what is said about Judah and Joseph, could apply only to this period. Steuernagel suggests that the allusion might be to the victory of the Edomites (II Kings 14:7), which perhaps put a stop to the distress caused Judah by Edom. Perhaps, also, the allusion might be to the situation described in II Kings 12:18ff. At all events, without stretching a point, such passages as those on Benjamin and Levi may be assumed to refer to the beginning of the eighth century BC, and the passage on Joseph hardly presupposes the period of Jeroboam I. Hence Reuss (Geschichte der Heiligen Schriften des Alten Testaments, p. 213), Cornill ("Einleitung in das Alte Testament," p. 72), and others are justified in considering the blessing of Moses to have originated in the eighth century BC. In any case, none of the verses indicates the authorship of Moses; this tradition is not implied in any feature of the blessing itself, and is merely referred to in the introductory and closing verses (31:30, 32:44a), which are intended to furnish a setting to the poem and to establish the connection between its various sections.
