= Diestel =

Diestel is a German-language surname. Notable people with the surname include:

- Arnold Diestel (1857–1924), German politician, First Mayor of Hamburg
- Erich Diestel (1892–1973), Wehrmacht general during World War II
- Joseph Diestel (1943–2017), American mathematician
- Ludwig Diestel (1825–1879), German Protestant theologian
- Peter-Michael Diestel (born 1952), German lawyer and politician, last East German Minister of the Interior
- Reinhard Diestel, German mathematician
- Kate Diestel, Ukrainian philosopher
