= Blessing of Jacob =

Prophetic poem in Genesis 49:1–27

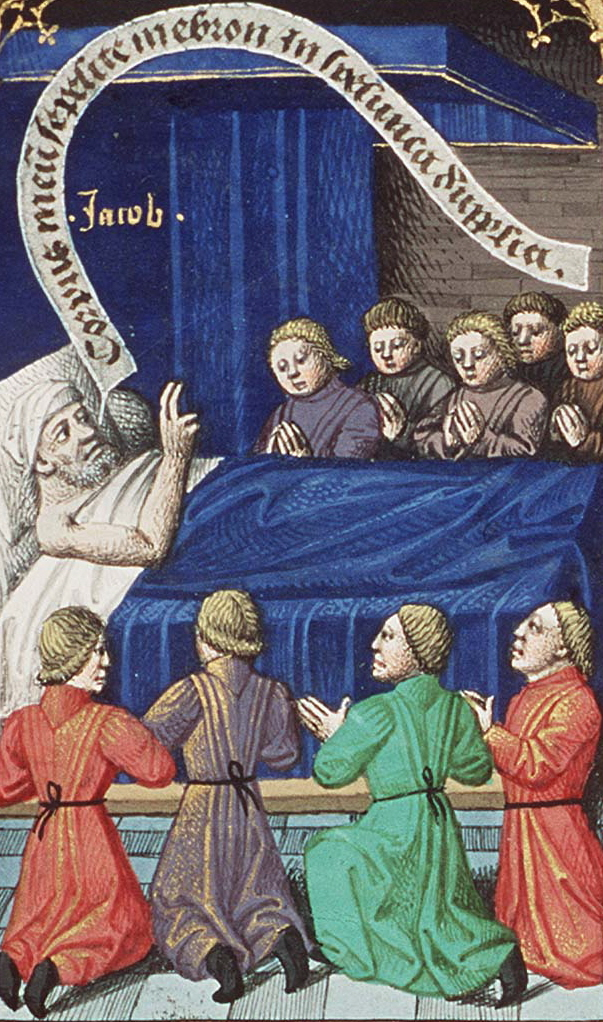
Jacob Blessing His Sons by François Maitre. The mention of a bed in Genesis 49:33 indicates that this is a deathbed speech.

The Blessing of Jacob is a prophetic poem that appears written in Genesis at 49:1–27 and mentions each of Jacob's twelve sons. Genesis presents the poem to be the words of Jacob himself to his sons when he is about to die. Linguistically, it is dated to the Archaic Hebrew period, one of the several oldest pieces of the Bible.

Like the Blessing of Moses, Genesis 49 assesses the Tribes of Israel, but there is little in common between the poems, except for describing one of the tribes as a judge, and another as a lion's cub. In the Blessing of Jacob, it is Dan that is the judge and Judah the cub, whereas in that of Moses, it is Gad that is the judge and Dan the cub.

Unlike Moses, Jacob is not afraid to castigate some of the tribes, in particular, Reuben, Simeon, and Levi. The poem appears to aim to describe why each of the tribes suffered the fate they did, explaining that the small territory of Reuben, the firstborn, compared to Judah's, is due to Reuben's incest with Bilhah, his father's concubine (mentioned at Genesis 35:22 and 49:3-4). Simeon's territory was located completely within that of Judah, and Levi only had a few scattered cities; their fates were attributed to their corresponding wickedness. Other tribes have an ascribed characteristic, whether it be seafaring or beautiful princesses.

Judah and the Joseph tribes both receive extensive blessings suited to their pre-eminence; Judah's as the major component of the Kingdom of Judah, and the Joseph tribes, in particular Ephraim, as the pre-eminent group in the Kingdom of Israel. In particular, Joseph is described as mighty, and thus as conquering, but consequently, it arguably suits the southern (i.e. Judah) bias of the source (Jahwist), according to the Documentary hypothesis.

== Source criticism ==
Although presented at face value as a cohesive unit, some scholars claim that some verses came from disparate sources. Verses 10, 25, 26, and probably verse 18, are regarded as interpolations, or in other words, written by another author.

== Date of composition ==
Because the unity of the passage is questionable, it is difficult to determine an exact date of composition. The first to dispute its unity was Ernest Renan (Histoire Générale des Langues Sémitiques, p. iii.) and the conjecture that the song consists of sayings originating in different periods gained more and more credence (J. P. N. Land, Disputatio de Carmine Jacobi, 1857; Kuenen, Holzinger, and others). The great variety of forms in the song supports this theory: while the language of one part is smooth and clear, another part is obscure. The determination of the correctness of this theory involves an investigation of the age of each verse; and in several instances this cannot be ascertained, since the verses indicate nothing concerning the time of their origin (see verses on Zebulun, Gad, Asher, and Naphtali). The verses on Issachar refer to the period after the struggles of Deborah (Judges 5); the verses on Dan, describing his battles in the north, where in his conflicts with the surrounding nations he maintained the old Israelitish custom of making an insidious rear attack instead of offering a bold challenge, refer to the time after Judges chapters 17 and following; and the verses on Judah (8, 11) presuppose the kingdom of Judah. The comparison of Judah to a lion's whelp seems to characterize him as a rising power. This may apply to different periods, not necessarily to the time of David.

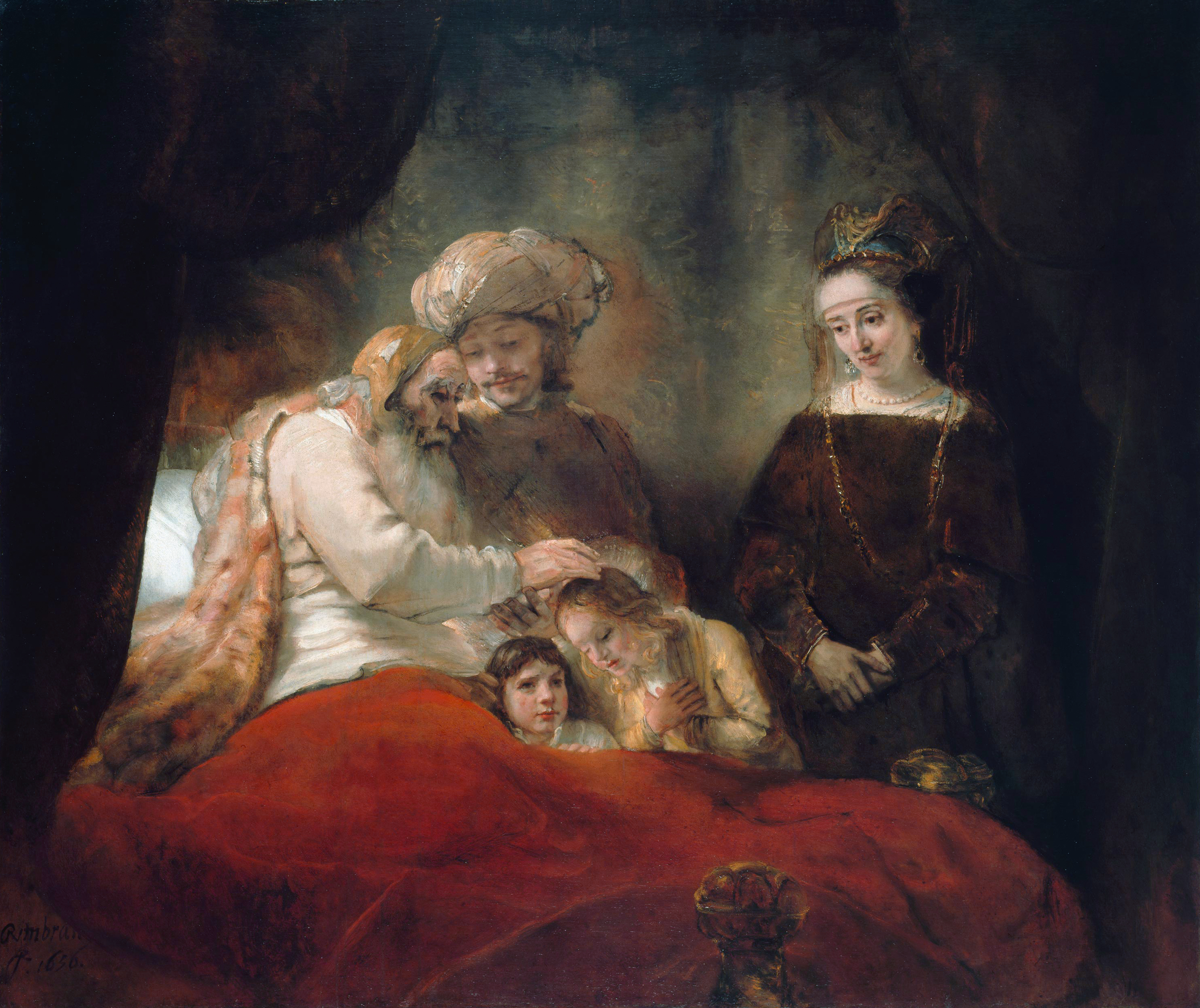
Jacob Blessing the Children of Joseph by Rembrandt, 1656

The verses on Joseph (22–27) allude to a defensive war, in which Joseph was successful. Since the text refers to archers, and the Arabs were excellent marksmen, August Dillmann thinks that the war was with the Arabs. The authors of the Jewish Encyclopedia regard his conjecture as erroneous; for the conflicts with the Arabs were confined to the portion of Manasseh east of the Jordan, and the term "Joseph" designates the portion of the tribe of Joseph dwelling west of the Jordan. The JE states that, moreover, the reference could not have been to the Philistines, by whom the tribe was occasionally subdued, the verse alludes to the Arameans of Damascus, with whom the conflicts were of long duration, often threatening the safety of the tribe of Joseph—that is, of the Northern Kingdom. Verse 24, however, bears no testimony of times following the glorious period of Jeroboam II; consequently the passage on Joseph points to the ninth century. The JE asserts that it was probably in the second half of this century, at all events before the conquests of Jeroboam, and evidently in the Southern Kingdom, that the collection of these pithy descriptions of the tribes was completed. If verses 25 and 26 are interpolations, this is the only interpretation that the JE authors hold would also explain both the esteem felt for Judah, expressed in the passage on him, and the silence concerning the Benjamite kingdom and possibly even the Northern Kingdom.

Dillmann endeavored to arrive at the same conclusion by the supposed sequence in the enumeration of the minor tribes, proceeding from south to north. But this supposition, according to the JE, is not tenable; for the very first tribe mentioned is the most northerly, and, furthermore, the sequence is broken by Gad. However, even if there were an exact geographical succession of tribes from south to north, it would prove nothing concerning the home of the collector of the passages, since the same order would have been natural for an Ephraimite (compare Holzinger ad loc.).

Zimmern's attempt (in "Zeit. für Assyriologie," 1892, pp. 161 et seq.) to connect Jacob's blessing with the Babylonian representation of the zodiac, specifically with the Gilgamesh epic, can not be regarded as successful. Ball has given some important and well-founded arguments against this theory (Commentary on Genesis in "S. B. O. T." pp. 114 et seq.). Zimmern himself does not assume that the poet or collector of the song was aware of the original significance of each passage.

Historically, Jacob's blessing is of great value, both because it is the only source of information for certain tribes in ancient times, and because it is an aid in rendering the sources (for example, Gen. 34) more intelligible.

== See also ==
- Vaychi#Fourth reading—Genesis 49:1–18

== Sources ==
Besides the commentaries on Genesis of Dillmann, Merx, Knobel, Delitzsch, Holzinger, Ball, and Gunkel see also:

- Ludwig Diestel, Segen Jakobs, 1853;
- Ernst Heinrich Meier, Geschichte der Poetischen Nationalliteratur, 1858;
- Kaufmann Kohler, Der Segen Jakobs, 1867;
- Augustus Newton Obbard, The Prophecy of Jacob, Cambridge 1867.
