= Ephraim and Judah =

In the Hebrew Scriptures (Tanakh), the reference of "Ephraim and Judah" (when employed together) are merely figurative terms used for the two ancient Kingdoms of Israel. See History of Ancient Israel and Judah.

The reference of "Ephraim and Judah" is employed most frequently by the Prophets (Nevi'im) of the Hebrew Scriptures. The phrases "Israel and Judah" and "Joseph and Judah" Zechariah 10:6 are used in similar fashion, referencing the same two respective Israelite Kingdoms.

== Tribes and Kingdoms ==
Since "Ephraim" was a specific tribe of Israel, the Tribe of Ephraim, careful contextual analysis should be used when distinguishing the differences in tribal and figurative kingdom identifications within the Tanakh. The prophets used the terms "Ephraim", "Joseph", and "Israel" interchangeably, speaking of the same entity, the Northern Kingdom of Israel, the House of Israel, or the House of Joseph. Zechariah 10:6

"Judah", likewise was a name used for both a tribe and kingdom (the tribe of Judah, the Kingdom of Judah, the House of Judah, and even the House of David (King David being a descendant of Judah)).
