= Joshua 17 =

Book of Joshua, chapter 17

- ← chapter 16 chapter 18 →
- The pages containing the Book of Joshua in Leningrad Codex (1008 CE).
- Book: Book of Joshua
- Hebrew Bible part: Nevi'im
- Order in the Hebrew part: 1
- Category: Former Prophets
- Christian Bible part: Old Testament
- Order in the Christian part: 6

Joshua 17 is the seventeenth chapter of the Book of Joshua in the Hebrew Bible or in the Old Testament of the Christian Bible. According to Jewish tradition the book was attributed to Joshua, with additions by the high priests Eleazar and Phinehas, but modern scholars view it as part of the Deuteronomistic History, which spans the books of Deuteronomy to 2 Kings, attributed to nationalistic and devotedly Yahwistic writers during the time of the reformer Judean king Josiah in 7th century BCE. This chapter records the allotment of land for the tribe of Joseph, especially the tribe of Manasseh, a part of a section comprising Joshua 13:1–21:45 about the Israelites allotting the land of Canaan.

== Text ==
This chapter was originally written in the Hebrew language. It is divided into 18 verses.

=== Textual witnesses ===
Some early manuscripts containing the text of this chapter in Hebrew are of the Masoretic Text tradition, which includes the Codex Cairensis (895), Aleppo Codex (10th century), and Codex Leningradensis (1008). Fragments containing parts of this chapter in Hebrew were found among the Dead Sea Scrolls including 4Q48 (4QJosh^{b}; 100–50 BCE) with extant verses 1–5, 11–15.

Extant ancient manuscripts of a translation into Koine Greek known as the Septuagint (originally was made in the last few centuries BCE) include Codex Vaticanus (B; $\mathfrak{G}$^{B}; 4th century) and Codex Alexandrinus (A; $\mathfrak{G}$^{A}; 5th century). (Note: The whole book of Joshua is missing from the extant Codex Sinaiticus.)

== Analysis ==
Map of the land allotment of the tribes of Israel at the time of Joshua

The narrative of Israelites allotting the land of Canaan comprising verses 13:1 to 21:45 of the Book of Joshua and has the following outline:

A. Preparations for Distributing the Land (13:1–14:15)
B. The Allotment for Judah (15:1–63)
C. The Allotment for Joseph (16:1–17:18)

1. Joseph's Allotment (16:1–4)
2. Ephraim's Inheritance (16:5–10)
3. Manasseh's Inheritance (17:1–13)
4. Additional Land for Joseph (17:14–18)

D. Land Distribution at Shiloh (18:1–19:51)
E. Levitical Distribution and Conclusion (20:1–21:45)

There are three key elements in the report of the allotments for the nine and a half tribes in the land of Canaan as follows:

Tribe	Boundary List	City List	Indigenous Population Comment
Judah	X	X	X
Ephraim	X		X
Manasseh	X		X
Benjamin	X	X	
Simeon		X	
Zebulun	X		
Issachar	X		
Asher	X		
Naphtali	X	X	
Dan		X	X

== Allotment for Manasseh (17:1–13) ==
Map of the land allotment of the tribes of Israel at the time of Joshua

The tribe of Joseph is allotted with subdivision into Ephraim and Manasseh (Joshua 14:4), overall covering a huge area of land in Canaan between the Jordan River and the Mediterranean Sea from just north of the Dead Sea to Mount Carmel in the north-west, in addition to the Transjordan lands allotted the other half of Manasseh. The allotment for the tribe of Manasseh as a whole include the Transjordan territory (17:1–6), containing genealogical information closely related to Numbers 26:29–34. Machir and Gilead appear in Judges 5 (verses 14, 17), where Machir appears to occupy lands west of the Jordan, while Gilead has the eastern part of Jordan, with six clans named in the Book of Numbers. The story of Zelophehad's daughters concludes a narrative from Numbers 27, 36, that the right of inheritance for female descendants, to protect family property in the absence of male ones, was established by Moses, with a requirement that the daughters should marry within the tribe (Numbers 36). Now the provisions were respected, and the five daughters of Zelophehad, son of Hepher, along with the five Gileadite clans (in place of Hepher), making 'ten portions' (verse 5) within the territory of Manasseh in west of Jordan (the other sons of Gilead already received lands in east of Jordan). Western Manasseh's allotment stretches from the north, bordering the land of Asher, to Michmethath, on the border with the land of Ephraim to the south (verse 7, cf. 16:6). There were still enclaves of the Canaanites (verse 11–12, cf. Judges 1:27–28), that the people of Manasseh failed to expel, but put them as forced labor.

=== Verses 2–3 ===
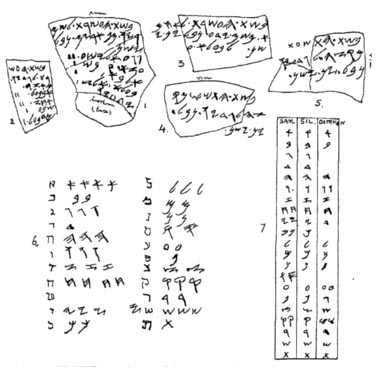
Sketch of a selection of Samaria Ostraca (850–750 BCE)

^{2} And allotments were made to the rest of the people of Manasseh by their clans, Abiezer, Helek, Asriel, Shechem, Hepher, and Shemida. These were the male descendants of Manasseh the son of Joseph, by their clans.
^{3} Now Zelophehad the son of Hepher, son of Gilead, son of Machir, son of Manasseh, had no sons, but only daughters, and these are the names of his daughters: Mahlah, Noah, Hoglah, Milcah, and Tirzah.

Of the eleven names (six sons of Gilead and five daughters of Zelophehad) six appear on ostraca (potsherds) found at Samaria, as place-names. These "Samaria Ostraca" were found in the site of king Ahab's palace, containing inscription written in the paleo-Hebrew alphabet, which is very similar to the Siloam Inscription.

== Additional land for Joseph (17:14–18) ==
The request from the tribe of Joseph (that is, the tribes of Manasseh and Ephraim) for more land is accepted by Joshua on the basis of the tribe's large population, that 'they should clear the hill country of trees and make it habitable'. This is evidenced in the history of agricultural deforestation in the hill country. Actually, the sense of constriction in the tribe of Joseph is related to their inability to expel the Canaanites of the plain, who have iron chariots. Thus, Joshua challenged the tribe of Joseph (with their great numbers) that they must drive the Canaanites out in spite of their chariots.

== See also ==
- Canaanites
- Tribe of Ephraim
- Tribe of Joseph
- Tribe of Manasseh
- Tribal allotments of Israel
- Related Bible parts: Numbers 26, Numbers 27, Numbers 36, Joshua 11, Joshua 14, Joshua 16

== Sources ==
- Beal, Lissa M. Wray (2019). Longman, Tremper III; McKnight, Scot (eds.). Joshua. The Story of God Bible Commentary. Zondervan Academic. ISBN 978-0310490838.
- Coogan, Michael David (2007). Coogan, Michael David; Brettler, Marc Zvi; Newsom, Carol Ann; Perkins, Pheme (eds.). The New Oxford Annotated Bible with the Apocryphal/Deuterocanonical Books: New Revised Standard Version, Issue 48 (Augmented 3rd ed.). Oxford University Press. ISBN 978-0195288810.
- Firth, David G. (2021). Joshua: Evangelical Biblical Theology Commentary. Evangelical Biblical Theology Commentary (EBTC) (illustrated ed.). Lexham Press. ISBN 9781683594406.
- Fitzmyer, Joseph A. (2008). A Guide to the Dead Sea Scrolls and Related Literature. Grand Rapids, MI: William B. Eerdmans Publishing Company. ISBN 9780802862419.
- Halley, Henry H. (1965). Halley's Bible Handbook: an abbreviated Bible commentary (24th (revised) ed.). Zondervan Publishing House. ISBN 0-310-25720-4.
- Harstad, Adolph L. (2004). Joshua. Concordia Publishing House. ISBN 978-0570063193.
- Hayes, Christine (2015). Introduction to the Bible. Yale University Press. ISBN 978-0300188271.
- Hubbard, Robert L (2009). Joshua. The NIV Application Commentary. Zondervan. ISBN 978-0310209348.
- McConville, Gordon (2007). "9. Joshua". In Barton, John; Muddiman, John (eds.). The Oxford Bible Commentary (first (paperback) ed.). Oxford University Press. pp. 158–176. ISBN 978-0199277186.
- Rösel, Hartmut N. (2011). Joshua. Historical commentary on the Old Testament. Vol. 6 (illustrated ed.). Peeters. ISBN 978-9042925922.
- Ulrich, Eugene, ed. (2010). The Biblical Qumran Scrolls: Transcriptions and Textual Variants. Brill.
- Webb, Barry G. (2012). The Book of Judges. New International Commentary on the Old Testament. Eerdmans Publishing Company. ISBN 9780802826282.
- Würthwein, Ernst (1995). The Text of the Old Testament. Translated by Rhodes, Erroll F. Grand Rapids, MI: Wm. B. Eerdmans. ISBN 0-8028-0788-7.
