= Ludwig Diestel =

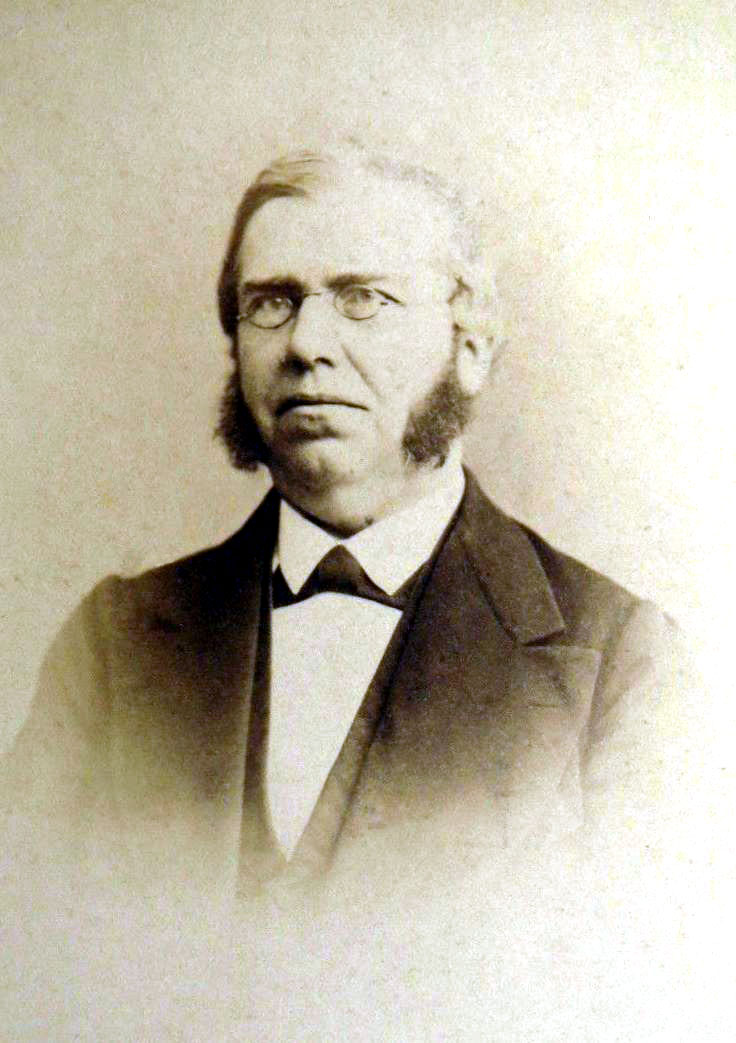
- Born: 28 September 1825; Königsberg, Kingdom of Prussia
- Died: 15 May 1879 (aged 53)
- Occupations: Theologian, professor
- Spouse: Sophie Henriette Emmy Antonie Delius
- Children: 6

Ludwig Diestel (28 September 1825 – 15 May 1879) was a German Protestant theologian born in Königsberg.

Diestel’s father died young and Diestel was raised by his mother and his uncle, who was a pastor.

He studied at several universities and in 1851 became a lecturer at the University of Bonn. In 1858 at Bonn he became an associate professor of theology. Later on, he served as a professor at the universities of Greifswald (1862), Jena (1867) and Tübingen (1872). He worked closely with the theologian Albrecht Ritschl.

Diestel was known for his liberal-minded theological views. He specialized in Old Testament exegesis and was the author the highly acclaimed Geschichte des Alten Testamentes in der christlichen Kirche ("History of the Old Testament in the Christian Church"), (1868). Other noted works by Diestel include:

- Der Segen Jakob's in Genesis, xlix historisch erläutert. (Jacob's Blessing in Genesis, historically explained); CA Schwetschke & Son, Brunswick, 1853
- Die Sintflut und die Flutsagen des Alterthums (The deluge and flood legends of ancient times); C. Habel, 1871
- Der Prophet Jesaia (with August Wilhelm Knobel)

== Family ==
His wife was Sophie Henriette Emmy Antonie Delius (1844 – 1923); the couple had three daughters and three sons. His daughter Meta was a well-known German oratorio and cantata singer.
