= Joshua 16 =

Book of Joshua, chapter 16

- ← chapter 15 chapter 17 →
- The pages containing the Book of Joshua in Leningrad Codex (1008 CE).
- Book: Book of Joshua
- Hebrew Bible part: Nevi'im
- Order in the Hebrew part: 1
- Category: Former Prophets
- Christian Bible part: Old Testament
- Order in the Christian part: 6

Joshua 16 is the sixteenth chapter of the Book of Joshua in the Hebrew Bible or in the Old Testament of the Christian Bible. According to Jewish tradition the book was attributed to Joshua, with additions by the high priests Eleazar and Phinehas, but modern scholars view it as part of the Deuteronomistic History, which spans the books of Deuteronomy to 2 Kings, attributed to nationalistic and devotedly Yahwistic writers during the time of the reformer Judean king Josiah in 7th century BCE. This chapter records the allotment of land for the tribe of Joseph, especially the tribe of Ephraim, a part of a section comprising Joshua 13:1–21:45 about the Israelites allotting the land of Canaan.

== Text ==
This chapter was originally written in the Hebrew language. It is divided into 10 verses.

=== Textual witnesses ===
Some early manuscripts containing the text of this chapter in Hebrew are of the Masoretic Text tradition, which includes the Codex Cairensis (895), Aleppo Codex (10th century), and Codex Leningradensis (1008).

Extant ancient manuscripts of a translation into Koine Greek known as the Septuagint (originally was made in the last few centuries BCE) include Codex Vaticanus (B; $\mathfrak{G}$^{B}; 4th century) and Codex Alexandrinus (A; $\mathfrak{G}$^{A}; 5th century). (Note: The whole book of Joshua is missing from the extant Codex Sinaiticus.)

== Analysis ==
Map of the land allotment of the tribes of Israel at the time of Joshua

The narrative of Israelites allotting the land of Canaan comprising verses 13:1 to 21:45 of the Book of Joshua and has the following outline:

A. Preparations for Distributing the Land (13:1–14:15)
B. The Allotment for Judah (15:1–63)
C. The Allotment for Joseph (16:1–17:18)

1. Joseph's Allotment (16:1–4)
2. Ephraim's Inheritance (16:5–10)
3. Manasseh's Inheritance (17:1–13)
4. Additional Land for Joseph (17:14–18)

D. Land Distribution at Shiloh (18:1–19:51)
E. Levitical Distribution and Conclusion (20:1–21:45)

There are three key elements in the report of the allotments for the nine and a haf tribes in the land of Canaan as follows:

Tribe	Boundary List	City List	Indigenous Population Comment
Judah	X	X	X
Ephraim	X		X
Manasseh	X		X
Benjamin	X	X	
Simeon		X	
Zebulun	X		
Issachar	X		
Asher	X		
Naphtali	X	X	
Dan		X	X

== Joseph's Allotment (16:1–4) ==
Map of the land allotment of the tribes of Israel at the time of Joshua

The tribe of Joseph is next to be allotted after Judah (cf. the space devoted to each tribe in Jacob's blessing, Genesis 49:8–12, 22–26) and with subdivision into Ephraim and Manasseh (Joshua 14:4), overall it covers a huge area of land in Canaan between the Jordan River and the Mediterranean Sea from just north of the Dead Sea to Mount Carmel in the north-west, in addition to the Transjordan lands allotted the other half of Manasseh. The southern boundary (verses 1–3) borders Benjamin to the south (16:2–3 parallel 18:12–13), running from Jericho (converging with both Judah and Benjamin there) up towards Bethel, along the route from Jericho to Ai, going past the important military outpost of Gezer, with a view of the entry to the hill country from the plain.

=== Verse 2 ===
Then going from Bethel to Luz, it passes along to Ataroth, the territory of the Archites.

- "Bethel": here is separated from Luz, whereas both are regarded as one in other verses (Joshua 18:13; Judges 1:23).
- "Archites": the residence or tribe of Hushai, David's advisor (cf. 2 Samuel 15:32; 2 Samuel 16:16; 1 Chronicles 27:33).

== Allotment for Ephraim (16:5–10) ==
The boundary of Ephraim is defined in detail on its northern and eastern borders with Manasseh (6b–7), and verse 9 seems to indicate a complex definition of the borders between them.

=== Verse 10 ===
However, they did not drive out the Canaanites who lived in Gezer, so the Canaanites have lived in the midst of Ephraim to this day but have been made to do forced labor.

- "Gezer": was later given to Israel by Pharaoh during the time of Solomon (1 Kings 9:16).

== See also ==
- Canaanites
- Tribe of Ephraim
- Tribe of Joseph
- Tribe of Manasseh
- Tribal allotments of Israel
- Related Bible parts: Joshua 11, Joshua 14, Joshua 17

== Sources ==
- Beal, Lissa M. Wray (2019). Longman, Tremper III; McKnight, Scot (eds.). Joshua. The Story of God Bible Commentary. Zondervan Academic. ISBN 978-0310490838.
- Coogan, Michael David (2007). Coogan, Michael David; Brettler, Marc Zvi; Newsom, Carol Ann; Perkins, Pheme (eds.). The New Oxford Annotated Bible with the Apocryphal/Deuterocanonical Books: New Revised Standard Version, Issue 48 (Augmented 3rd ed.). Oxford University Press. ISBN 978-0195288810.
- Firth, David G. (2021). Joshua: Evangelical Biblical Theology Commentary. Evangelical Biblical Theology Commentary (EBTC) (illustrated ed.). Lexham Press. ISBN 9781683594406.
- Halley, Henry H. (1965). Halley's Bible Handbook: an abbreviated Bible commentary (24th (revised) ed.). Zondervan Publishing House. ISBN 0-310-25720-4.
- Harstad, Adolph L. (2004). Joshua. Concordia Publishing House. ISBN 978-0570063193.
- Hayes, Christine (2015). Introduction to the Bible. Yale University Press. ISBN 978-0300188271.
- Hubbard, Robert L (2009). Joshua. The NIV Application Commentary. Zondervan. ISBN 978-0310209348.
- McConville, Gordon (2007). "9. Joshua". In Barton, John; Muddiman, John (eds.). The Oxford Bible Commentary (first (paperback) ed.). Oxford University Press. pp. 158–176. ISBN 978-0199277186.
- Rösel, Hartmut N. (2011). Joshua. Historical commentary on the Old Testament. Vol. 6 (illustrated ed.). Peeters. ISBN 978-9042925922.
- Webb, Barry G. (2012). The Book of Judges. New International Commentary on the Old Testament. Eerdmans Publishing Company. ISBN 9780802826282.
- Würthwein, Ernst (1995). The Text of the Old Testament. Translated by Rhodes, Erroll F. Grand Rapids, MI: Wm. B. Eerdmans. ISBN 0-8028-0788-7.
