= Twelve Tribes of Israel =

Descendants of Jacob in the Abrahamic religions

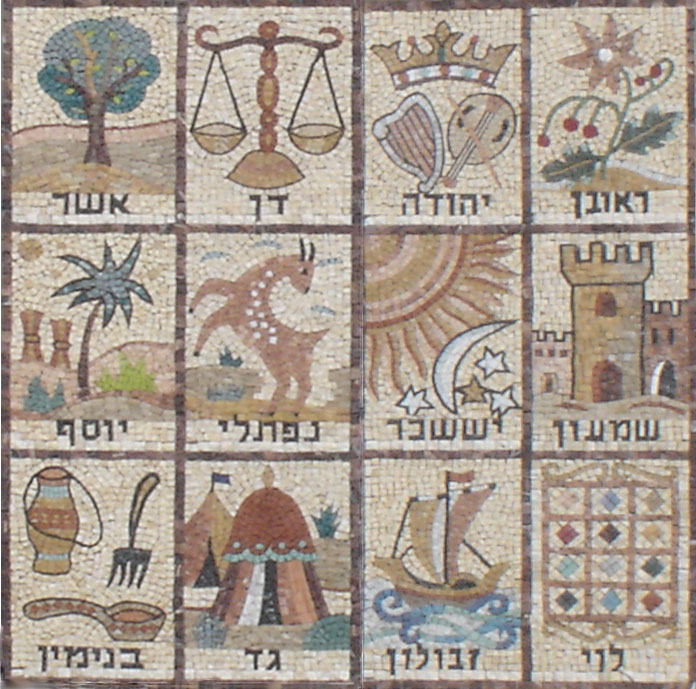
Mosaic depicting the 12 tribes and their Hebrew names, with symbolic images.: Asher: a tree; Dan: Scales of justice; Judah: Kinnor, cithara, and crown, symbolising King David; Reuben: Mandrake (Genesis 30:14); Joseph: Palm tree and sheaves of wheat, likely references to the dreams he received as a child (Genesis 37:7); Naphtali: gazelle (Genesis 49:21); Issachar: Sun, moon and stars (1 Chronicles 12:32); Simeon: towers and walls of the city of Shechem; Benjamin: jug, ladle, and fork; Gad: tents, symbolizing their itinerancy as cattle-herders; Zebulun: ship, due to their bordering the Sea of Galilee and Mediterranean; Levi: Priestly breastplate, symbolizing the Kohanim

The Twelve Tribes of Israel (Hebrew: שִׁבְטֵי־יִשְׂרָאֵל, romanized: Šiḇṭê Yiśrāʾēl, lit. 'Staffs of Israel') are described in the Hebrew Bible as being the descendants of Jacob, a Hebrew patriarch who was a son of Isaac and thereby a grandson of Abraham. Jacob, later known as Israel, had a total of 12 sons, from whom each tribe's ancestry and namesake is derived: Reuben, Simeon, Levi, Judah, Dan, Naphtali, Gad, Asher, Issachar, Zebulun, Joseph, and Benjamin. Collectively known as the Israelites, they inhabited a part of Canaan—the Land of Israel—during the Iron Age. Their history, society, culture, and politics feature heavily in the Abrahamic religions, especially Judaism.

In the biblical narrative, after Moses oversaw the Israelites' departure from Egypt, he died and was succeeded by Joshua, who led the conquest of Canaan and subsequently allotted territory for all but the Tribe of Levi, which was instead dedicated 48 cities. This development culminated in the establishment of Israel and Judah, purportedly beginning with a Kingdom of Israel and Judah before splitting into the Kingdom of Israel in the north and the Kingdom of Judah in the south.

Wars with neighbouring Near Eastern powers eventually resulted in the destruction of both Israel and Judah: the Assyrian conquest of Israel resulted in the mass displacement of most of the Israelites, giving rise to the legacy of the 10 Lost Tribes; and the Babylonian conquest of Judah resulted in the mass displacement of much of the remaining Israelites, who belonged to the Tribe of Judah and the Tribe of Benjamin.

In modern scholarship, there is skepticism as to whether the Twelve Tribes of Israel actually existed, with the use of "12" thought more likely to signify a symbolic tradition as part of a national founding myth, although some academics disagree with this view.

== Biblical narrative ==
=== Genealogy ===
Jacob, later called Israel, was the second-born son of Isaac and Rebecca, the younger twin brother of Esau, and the grandson of Abraham and Sarah. According to biblical texts, he was chosen by God to be the patriarch of the Israelite nation. From what is known of Jacob, he had two wives, sisters Leah and Rachel, and two concubines, Bilhah and Zilpah. The twelve sons form the basis for the twelve tribes of Israel, listed in the order from oldest to youngest: Reuben, Simeon, Levi, Judah, Dan, Naphtali, Gad, Asher, Issachar, Zebulun, Joseph, and Benjamin. Jacob was known to display favoritism among his children, particularly for Joseph and Benjamin, the sons of his favorite wife, Rachel, and so the tribes themselves were not treated equally in a divine sense. Joseph, despite being the second-youngest son, received double the inheritance of his brothers, treated as if he were the firstborn son instead of Reuben, and so his tribe was later split into two tribes, named after his sons, Ephraim and Manasseh.

=== Sons and tribes ===
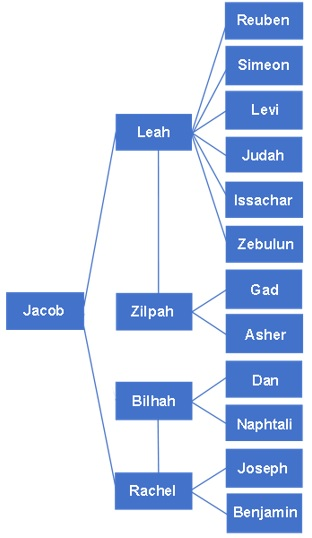
Parentage of Jacob's twelve sons, per Genesis 35

The Israelites were the descendants of twelve sons of the biblical patriarch Jacob. Jacob also had at least one daughter, Dinah, whose descendants were not recognized as a tribe. The sons of Jacob were born in Padan-aram from different mothers, as follows:

- The sons of Leah; Reuben (Jacob's firstborn), Simeon, Levi, Judah, Issachar, and Zebulun
- The sons of Rachel; Joseph and Benjamin (Jacob's last)
- The sons of Bilhah, Rachel's handmaid; Dan and Naphtali
- The sons of Zilpah, Leah's handmaid; Gad and Asher

Deuteronomy 27:12–13 lists the twelve tribes:

- Reuben (Hebrew רְאוּבֵן Rəʾûḇēn)
- Simeon (שִׁמְעוֹן Šimʿôn)
- Levi (לֵוִי Lēwî)
- Judah (יְהוּדָה Yəhûḏâ)
- Issachar (יִשָּׂשכָר Yiśśāḵār)
- Zebulun (זְבוּלֻן Zəḇûlūn)
- Dan (דָּן Dān)
- Naphtali (נַפְתָּלִי Nap̄tālî)
- Gad (גָּד Gāḏ)
- Asher (אָשֵׁר ʾĀšēr)
- Benjamin (בִּנְיָמִן Binyāmīn)
- Joseph (יוֹסֵף Yōsēp̄), later split into two tribes:
  - Ephraim (אֶפְרַיִם ʼEp̄ráyim)
  - Manasseh (מְנַשֶּׁה Mənaššeh)

Jacob elevated the descendants of Ephraim and Manasseh (the two sons of Joseph and his Egyptian wife Asenath) to the status of full tribes in their own right. Joseph received Reuben's birthright because of the latter's transgression with Bilhah.

In the biblical narrative, the period from the conquest of Canaan under the leadership of Joshua until the formation of the United Kingdom of Israel passed with the tribes forming a loose confederation, described in the Book of Judges. Modern scholarship has called into question the beginning, middle, and end of this picture and the account of the conquest under Joshua has largely been abandoned. The biblical depiction of the "period of the Judges" is widely considered doubtful. The extent to which a united Kingdom of Israel ever existed is also a matter of ongoing dispute.

Living in exile in the sixth century BCE, the prophet Ezekiel has a vision for the restoration of Israel, of a future in which the twelve tribes of Israel are living in their land again. In its account of the completion of the Second Temple in Jerusalem after the return of the exiles, the Book of Ezra states that the dedication of the temple was accompanied by the sacrifice of 12 he-goats as a sin offering for the twelve tribes.

=== Land allotment ===
Joshua's allotment of land to the Israelite tribes according to Joshua 13–19

According to Joshua 13–19, the Land of Israel was divided by lots into twelve sections corresponding to the twelve tribes of Israel. There is a contractual aspect to the division of the land according to the tribes. According to the Babylonian Talmud (Baba Bathra 106b), the lots did not actually function as a legal allocation of property but only clarified the division. Rather, the legal allocation of property took effect when the tribes actually settled on the land and worked the land.

The tribes receiving an allotment were:

- Reuben
- Simeon
- Judah
- Issachar
- Zebulun
- Dan
- Naphtali
- Gad
- Asher
- Joseph, divided into two tribes, receive two allotments:
  - Ephraim
  - Manasseh
- Benjamin

The Tribe of Levi received no land appropriation but had six Cities of Refuge under their administration.

== Descendants ==
- The Tribe of Reuben: Reuben was a member of the Northern Kingdom of Israel until the kingdom was conquered by Assyria. According to 1 Chronicles 5:26, Tiglath-Pileser III of Assyria (ruled 745–727 BCE) deported the Reubenites, Gadites, and the half-tribe of Manasseh to "Halah, Habor, Hara, and the Gozan River." According to the Moabite Mesha Stele (c. 840 BCE) the Moabites reclaimed many territories in the second part of the 9th century BCE (only recently conquered by Omri and Ahab according to the Stele). The stele does mention fighting against the tribe of Gad but not the tribe of Reuben, even though taking Nebo and Jahaz which were in the centre in their designated homeland. This would suggest that the tribe of Reuben at this time was no longer recognizable as a separate force in this area. Even if still present at the outbreak of this war, the outcome of this war would have left them without a territory of their own, just like the tribes of Simeon and Levi. This is, according to Richard Elliot Friedman in Who Wrote the Bible?, the reason why these three tribes are passed over in favour of Judah in the J-version of Jacob's deathbed blessing (composed in Judah before the fall of Israel).
- The Tribe of Simeon: An apocryphal midrash claims that the tribe was deported by the Babylonians to the Kingdom of Aksum (in what is now Ethiopia), to a place behind the dark mountains.
- The Tribe of Issachar: R' David Kimchi (ReDaK) to I Chronicles 9:1 expounds that there remained from the tribes of Ephraim, Manasseh, Issachar and Zebulun in the territory of Judah after the exile of the ten tribes. This remnant returned with the tribe of Judah after the Babylonian Exile.
- The Tribe of Judah: returned to their original land along with what remained from the tribes of Ephraim, Manasseh, Issachar, and Zebulun that had not been exiled elsewhere, after the Babylonian Exile.
- The Tribe of Zebulun: As part of the Kingdom of Israel, the territory of Zebulun was conquered by the Assyrians, and the tribe exiled; the manner of their exile led to their further history being lost. Israeli Knesset member Ayoob Kara speculated that the Druze are descended from one of the Lost Tribes of Israel, probably Zevulun. Kara stated that the Druze share many of the same beliefs as Jews, and that he has genetic evidence to prove that the Druze were descended from Jews.
- The Tribes of Dan; Gad; Asher and Naphtali: Ethiopian Jews, also known as Beta Israel, claim descent from the Tribe of Dan, whose members migrated south along with members of the tribes of Gad, Asher, and Naphtali, into the Kingdom of Kush, now Ethiopia and Sudan, during the destruction of the First Temple. As noted above the Tribe of Simeon was also deported to the Kingdom of Aksum (in what is now Ethiopia).
- The Tribe of Ephraim: As part of the Kingdom of Israel, the territory of Ephraim was conquered by the Assyrians, and the tribe exiled; the manner of their exile led to their further history being lost. However, several modern day groups claim descent, with varying levels of academic and rabbinical support. The Samaritans claim that some of their adherents are descended from this tribe, and many Persian Jews claim to be descendants of Ephraim. Further afield, in India the Telugu Jews claim descent from Ephraim, and call themselves Bene Ephraim, relating similar traditions to those of the Mizo Jews, whom the modern state of Israel regards as descendants of Manasseh.
- The Tribe of Manasseh: Part of the Kingdom of Israel, the territory of Manasseh was conquered by the Assyrians, and the tribe exiled; the manner of their exile led to their further history being lost. However, several modern day groups claim descent, with varying levels of academic and rabbinical support. Both the Bnei Menashe (the Mizo Jews, whom the modern state of Israel regards as descendants of Manasseh) and the Samaritans claim that some of their adherents are descended from this tribe.

== Symbols ==
Symbols have been attributed to the twelve tribes:

- Reuben: water (Genesis 49)
- Simeon: the gates of Shechem (Midrash BaMidbar Rabbah 2:7)
- Levi: Thummim and Urim (see Deut 33:8)
- Judah: lion (Genesis 49)
- Issachar: donkey (Genesis 49:14) or sun, moon, and stars (based on tradition of having created a calendar system)
- Zebulun: ship (Genesis 49)
- Dan: snake (Genesis 49)
- Naphtali: deer (Genesis 49)
- Gad: military encampment/tent (Genesis 49:19)
- Asher: oil or an olive tree (Deut 33)
- Benjamin: two hills (Deut 33)
- Joseph: bull (Deut 33)
  - Ephraim:
  - Manasseh:

== In the New Testament ==
The twelve tribes of Israel are referred to in the New Testament. In the gospels of Matthew (19:28) and Luke (22:30), Jesus anticipates that in the Kingdom of God his disciples will "sit on [twelve] thrones, judging the twelve tribes of Israel". The Epistle of James (1:1) addresses his audience as "the twelve tribes which are scattered abroad".

The Book of Revelation (7:1–8) gives a list of the twelve tribes, which omits Dan, includes Simeon and Levi and lists Joseph (in place of Ephraim) alongside Manasseh. In the vision of the Heavenly Jerusalem, the tribes' names (the names of the twelve sons of Jacob) are written on the city gates (Ezekiel 48:30–35 & Revelation 21:12–13).

== Latter-day Saints ==
In the Church of Jesus Christ of Latter-day Saints, a patriarchal blessing usually contains a declaration of the lineage of the recipient of blessing in relation to the twelve tribes of Israel.

== In Islam ==
The Quran (7th century CE) states that the people of Moses were split into twelve tribes. Surah 7 (Al-A'raf) verse 160 says:

"We split them up into twelve tribal communities, and We revealed to Moses, when his people asked him for water, [saying], 'Strike the rock with your cane,' whereat twelve fountains gushed forth from it. Every tribe came to know its drinking-place. And We shaded them with clouds, and We sent down to them manna and quails: 'Eat of the good things We have provided you.' And they did not wrong Us, but they used to wrong [only] themselves."

Surah 12 (Yusuf) describes the history of Joseph and mentions his brothers. Verses 3-4 say:

"When Joseph said to his father, ‘Father! I saw eleven planets (or stars), and the sun and the moon: I saw them prostrating themselves before me.’ He said, ‘My son, do not recount your dream to your brothers, lest they should devise schemes against you. Satan is indeed man’s manifest enemy."

== Historicity ==
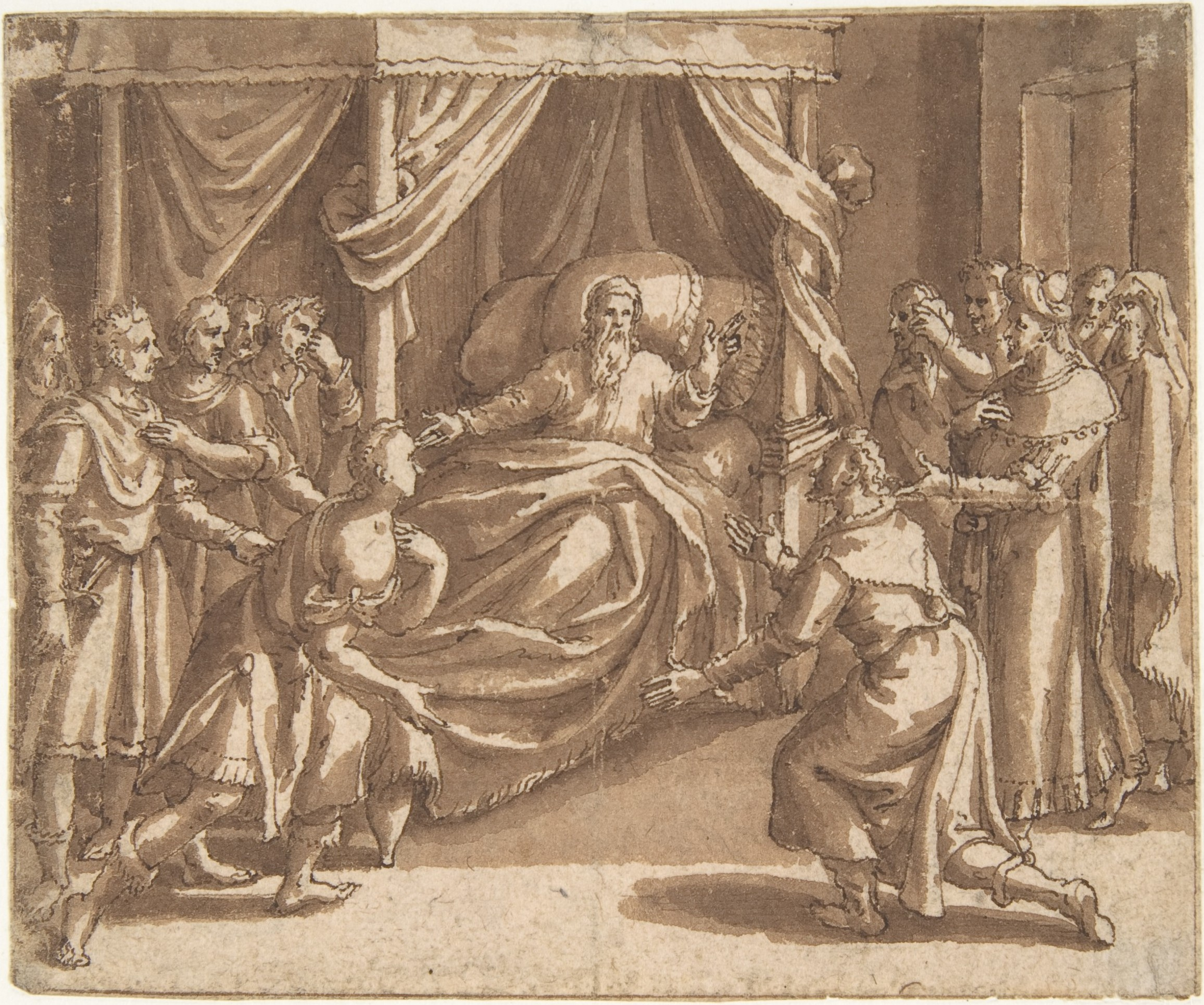
The dying Jacob blesses his twelve sons (Adam van Noort)

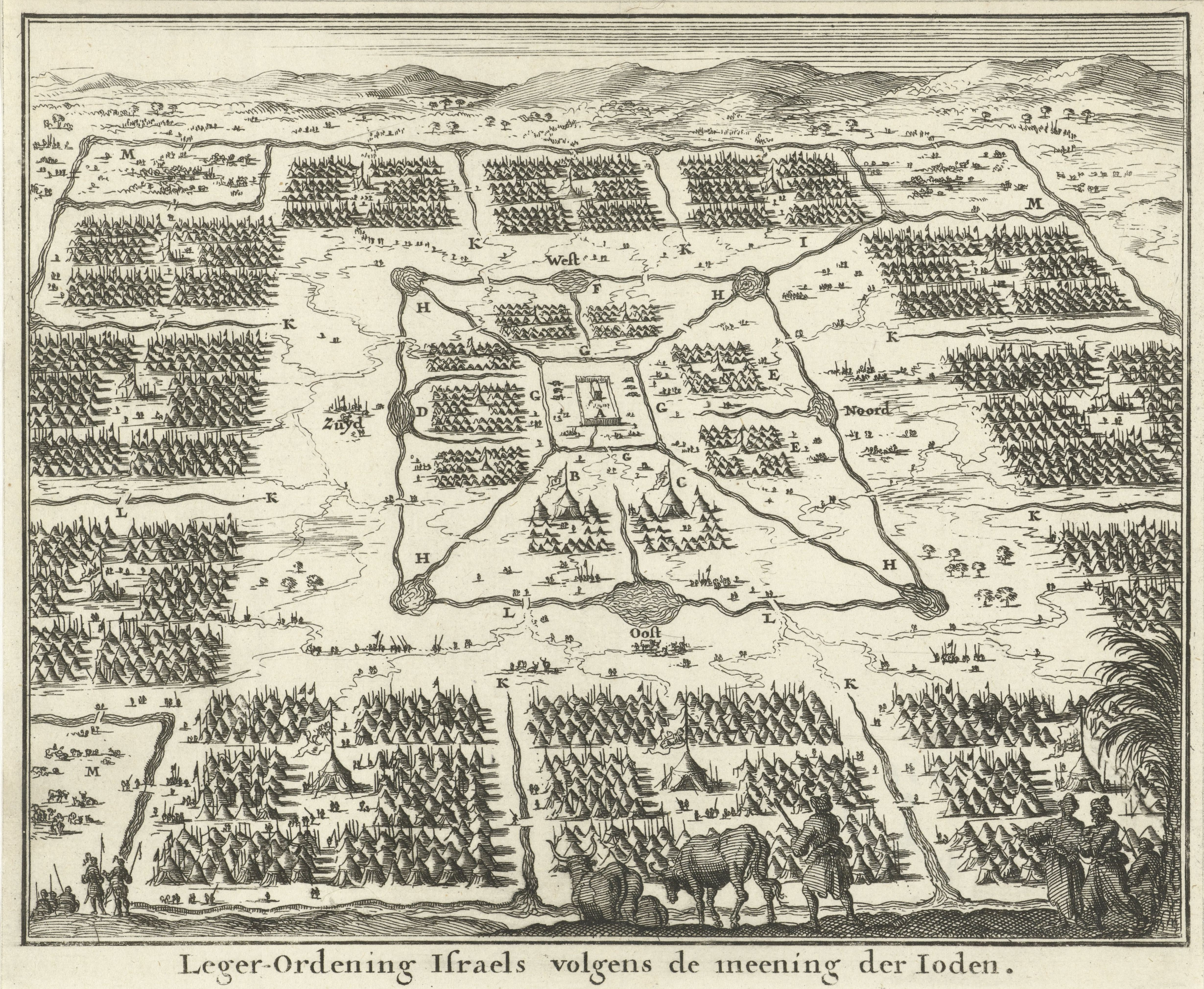
The twelve tribes of Israel camped around the tabernacle. (Jan Luyken, 1673)

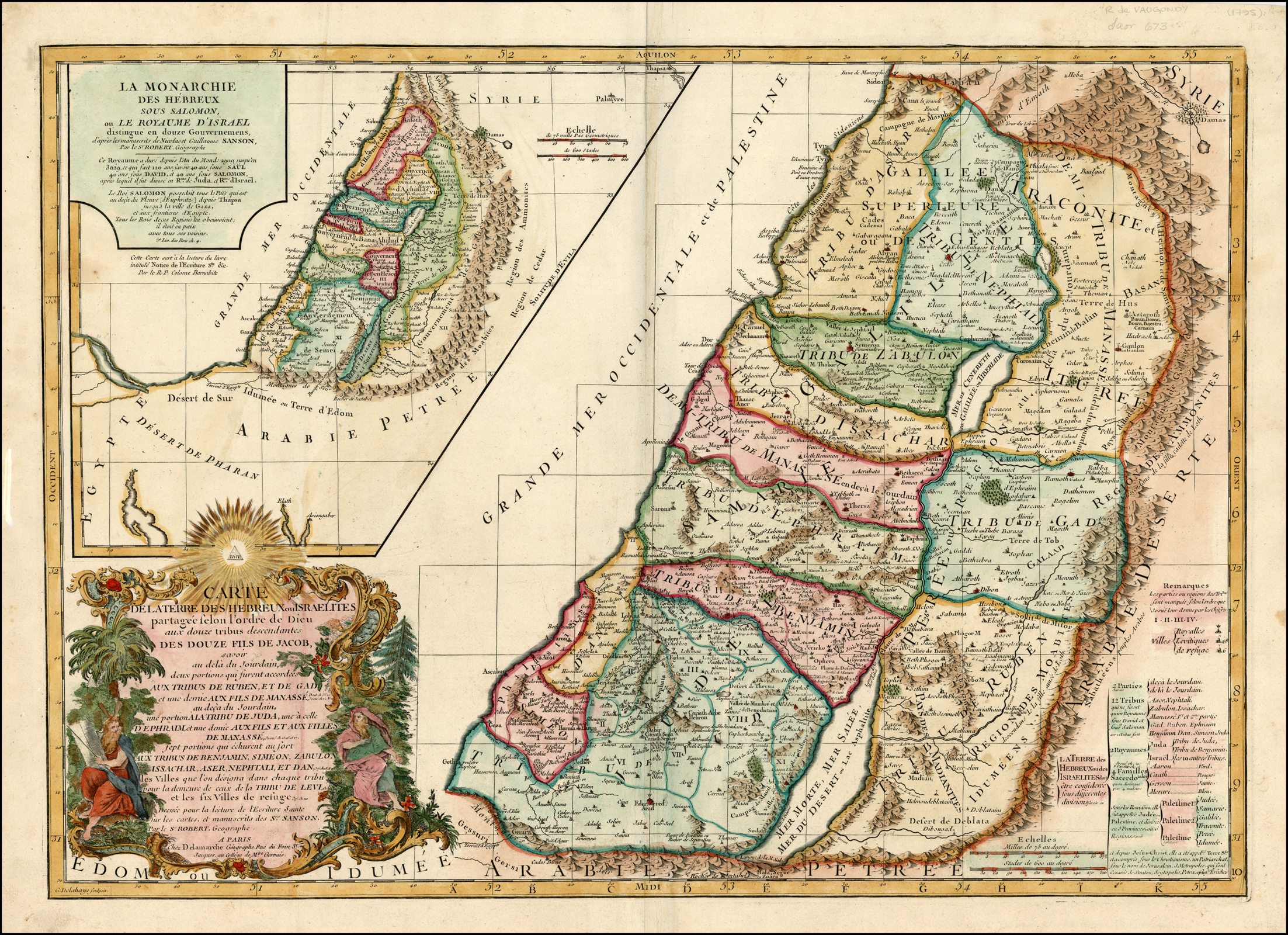
Map of tribal territories in the Land of Israel (Charles François Delamarche, 1797)

=== Scholarly examination ===
For thousands of years, Christians and Jews have accepted the history of the twelve tribes as fact. Since the 19th century, historical criticism has examined the veracity of the historical account; whether the twelve tribes ever existed as they are described, the historicity of the eponymous ancestors, and even whether the earliest version of this tradition assumes the existence of twelve tribes.

Biblical lists of tribes, not all of which number 12, include the following:

- The Blessing of Jacob (Genesis 49) mentions Reuben, Simeon, Levi, Judah, Zebulun, Issachar, Dan, Gad, Asher, Naphtali, Joseph, and Benjamin and especially extolls Joseph over his brothers.
- Blessing of Moses (Deuteronomy 33) mentions Benjamin, Joseph, Zebulun, Issachar, Gad, Dan, Naphtali, Asher, Reuben, Levi, and Judah, omitting Simeon.
- Judges 1 describes the conquest of Canaan; Benjamin and Simeon are mentioned in the section about Judah's exploits, and are listed alongside the Calebites and the Kenites, two Judahite clans. Joseph, Ephraim, Manasseh, Zebulun, Asher, Naphtali and Dan are mentioned, but Issachar, Reuben, Levi and Gad are not.
- the Song of Deborah (Judges 5:2–31), widely considered one of the oldest passages in the Bible, mentions eight of the tribes: Ephraim, Benjamin, Zebulun, Issachar, Reuben, Dan, Asher, and Naphtali. The people of the Gilead region, and Machir, a subsection of Manasseh, are also mentioned. The other five tribes (Simeon, Levi, Judah, Gad, and Joseph) are not mentioned.
- The Rechabites and the Jerahmeelites also appear as Israelite clans elsewhere in the Bible.

=== Theories of origin ===
Scholars such as Max Weber (in Ancient Judaism) and Ronald M. Glassman (2017) argued that there never was a fixed number of tribes and instead regarded the idea that there were always twelve tribes as part of the Israelite national founding myth: the number 12 was an ideal number, which had symbolic significance in Near Eastern cultures with duodecimal counting systems, from which, among other things, the modern 12-hour clock is derived.

Biblical scholar Arthur Peake saw the tribes originating as postdiction, as eponymous metaphor giving an aetiology of the connectedness of the tribe to others in the Israelite confederation.

Historian Immanuel Lewy in Commentary mentions "the Biblical habit of representing clans as persons. In the Bible, the twelve tribes of Israel are sons of a man called Jacob or Israel, as Edom or Esau is the brother of Jacob, and Ishmael and Isaac are the sons of Abraham. Elam and Ashur, names of two ancient nations, are sons of a man called Shem. Sidon, a Phoenician town, is the first-born of Canaan; the lands of Egypt and Abyssinia are the sons of Ham. This kind of mythological geography is widely known among all ancient peoples. Archaeology has found that many of these personal names of ancestors originally were the names of clans, tribes, localities, or nations. [...] if the names of the twelve tribes of Israel are those of mythological ancestors and not of historical persons, then many stories of the patriarchal and Mosaic age lose their historic validity. They may indeed partly reflect dim reminiscences of the Hebrews' tribal past, but in their specific detail they are fiction."

Norman Gottwald argued that the division into twelve tribes originated as an administrative scheme under King David.

Additionally, the Mesha Stele (carved c. 840 BCE) mentions Omri as King of Israel and also mentions "the men of Gad".

=== Levite Y-chromosome studies ===
Recent studies of genetic markers within Jewish populations strongly suggest that modern Ashkenazi Levites (Jewish males who claim patrilineal descent from the hereditary male Jewish lineage of Levitical priests) are descendants of a single Levite ancestor who came to Europe from the Middle East roughly 1,750 years ago. The growth of this specific lineage aligns with the expansion patterns seen in other founding groups of Ashkenazi Jews. This means that a relatively small number of original ancestors have had a large impact on the genetic makeup of today's Ashkenazi population.

== Attributed coats of arms ==
Attributed arms are Western European coats of arms given retrospectively to persons real or fictitious who died before the start of the age of heraldry in the latter half of the 12th century.

Attributed arms of the Twelve Tribes from the Portuguese Thesouro de Nobreza, 1675

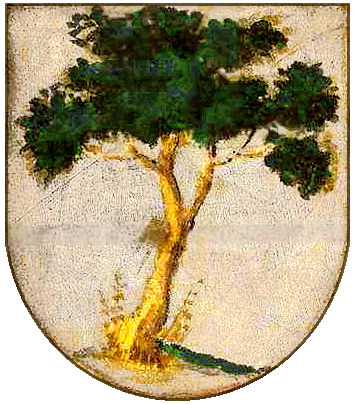
Asher

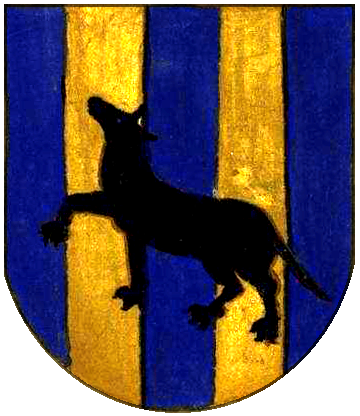
Benjamin

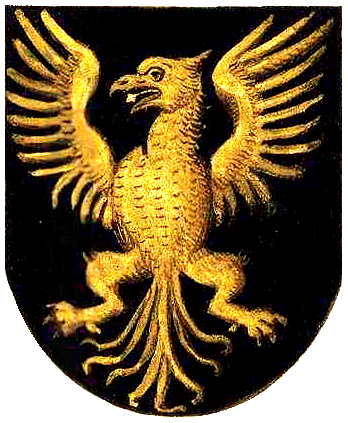
Dan

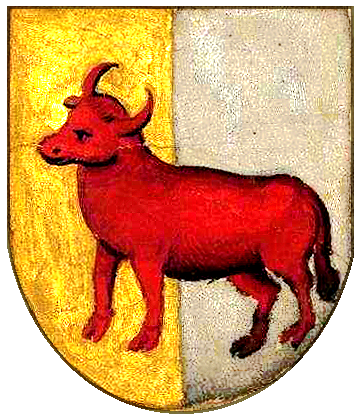
Ephraim

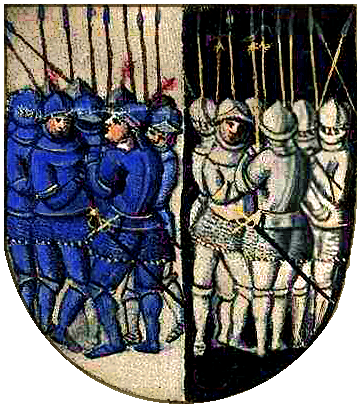
Gad

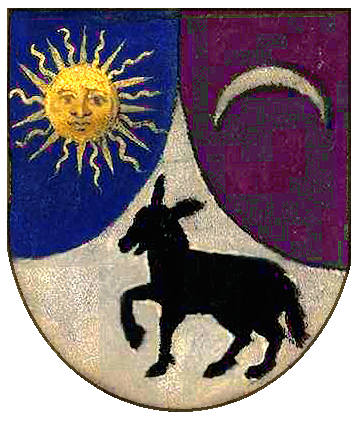
Issachar

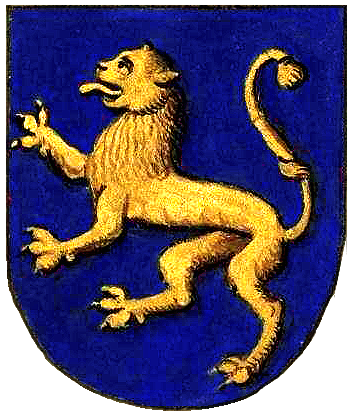
Judah

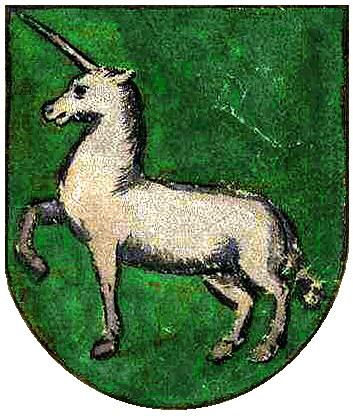
Manasseh

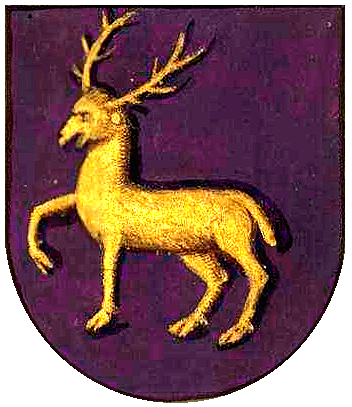
Naphtali

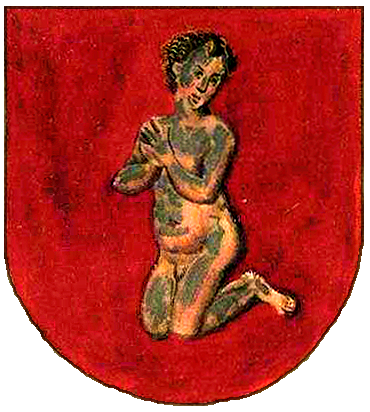
Reuben

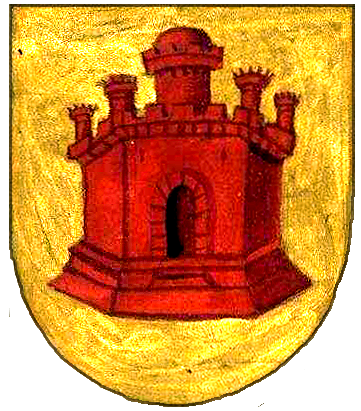
Simeon

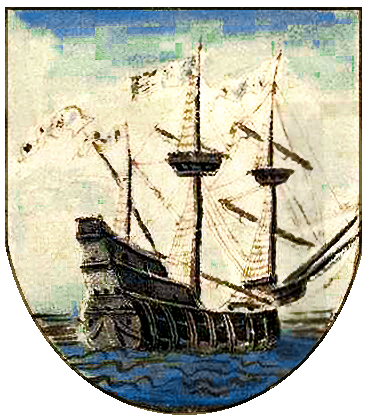
Zebulun

== See also ==
- Black Judaism
- Israel (the modern state, founded in 1948 CE)
- Israelite highland settlement
- Kingdom of Israel (the northern kingdom, according to scriptural accounts, it existed from 930 to 722 BCE)
- Kingdom of Judah (the southern kingdom, according to scriptural accounts, it existed from 930 to 586 BCE)
- List of Jewish states and dynasties
- Ten Lost Tribes
