= Tribe of Simeon =

One of the twelve Tribes of Israel

According to the Hebrew Bible, the Tribe of Simeon (/ˈsɪmiən/; Hebrew: שִׁמְעוֹן Šīm‘ōn, "hearkening/listening/understanding/empathizing") was one of the twelve tribes of Israel. The Book of Joshua locates its territory inside the boundaries of the Tribe of Judah (Joshua 19:9). It has been usually counted as one of the ten lost tribes, although its territory was surrounded by and gradually being absorbed by Judah from the start. For any Simeonites to be of the Northern Kingdom of Israel or to be affected by the Assyrian sack of the kingdom (future lost tribes) would imply a northward migration at some point in time, with support perhaps from 2 Chronicles (15:9 and 34:6,7).

The biblical narrative has it coming into the Land of Israel following the Exodus, while scholarly reconstructions have offered a variety of opinions as to its origins and early history. From the Book of Genesis until the Babylonian captivity, the Bible provides various details about its history, after which point it disappears from the record. A variety of extrabiblical traditional Jewish sources also provide additional material on the tribe.

== Territory ==
At its height, the territory occupied by the Tribe of Simeon was in the southwest of Canaan, bordered on the east and south by the tribe of Judah; the boundaries with the tribe of Judah are vague, and it seems that Simeon may have been an enclave within the west of the territory of the tribe of Judah. Simeon was one of the less significant tribes in the Kingdom of Judah.

Attempts to reconstruct the territory of Simeon work with three biblical lists: Book of Joshua 19:2-9, 1 Chronicles 4:28-32, which list towns belonging to Simeon, and Joshua 15:20-30, which lists these same towns as part of the territory of Judah. Nadav Na'aman divides scholarly work on the subject into two "schools of thought," which he calls "the Alt school" (following Albrecht Alt) and the "other school." The Alt school takes the list in Joshua 15 as reflecting the historical situation during the reign of Josiah, and sees the other two as later, and less reliable, attempts by editors to work out the earlier Simeonite territory. The "other school" sees the first two lists as reflecting the actual historical situation in the time of David (compare 1 Chronicles 4:31), and Joshua 15 as reflecting the situation at a later date. According to Na'aman, Simeonites settled in a pattern which overlapped Judah: while maintaining a distinct tribal identity and organization throughout the First Temple period (until 586 BC), Simeonites and Judahites lived in some of the same areas.

The lot of Simeon, which was the second, included that part of Idumea which bordered upon Egypt and Arabia.

== Origin ==
Map of the twelve tribes of Israel; Simeon is shaded gold, in the south

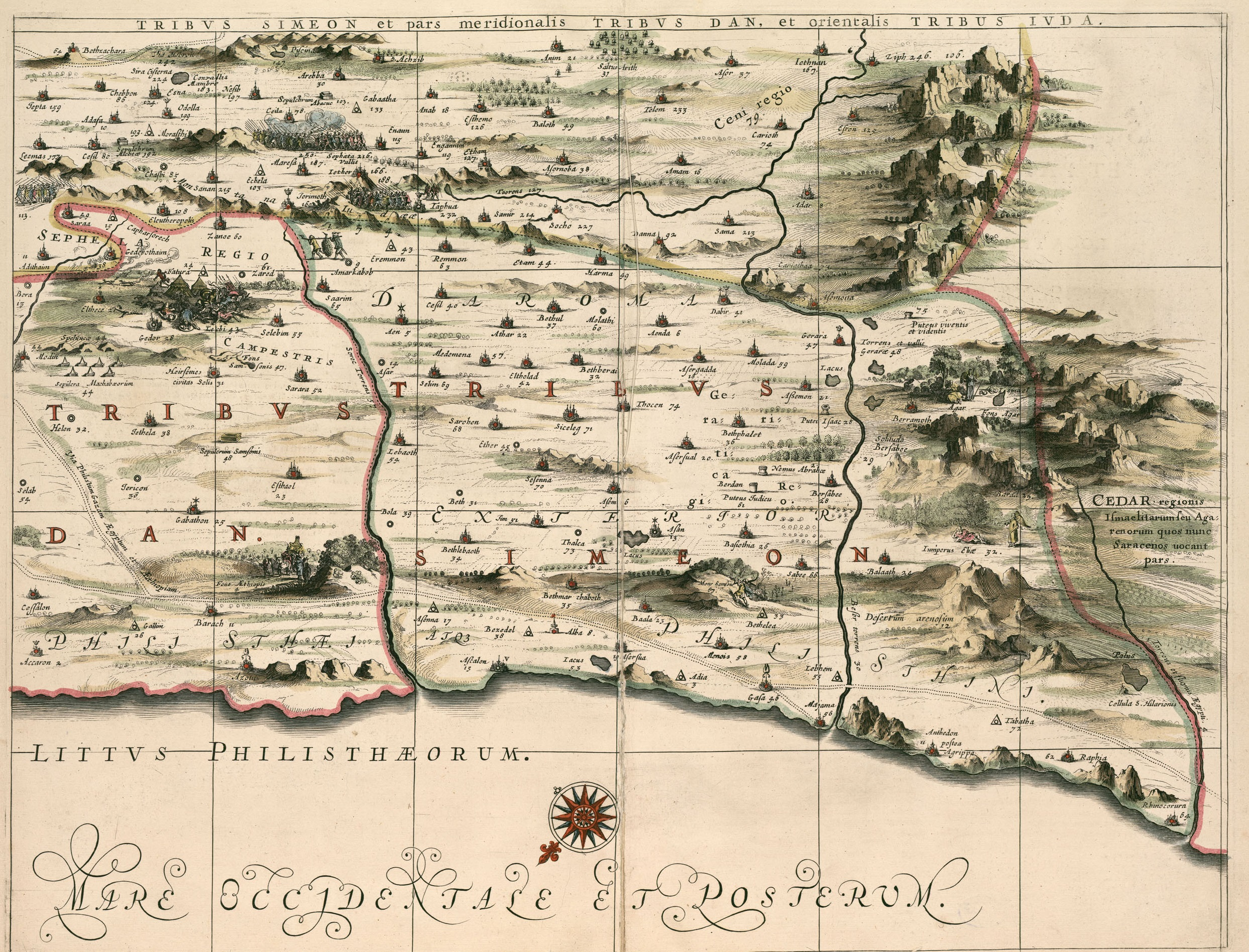
Map of Simeon's territory (east is on the top of the map)

According to the Hebrew Bible, the tribe consisted of descendants of Simeon, the second son of Jacob and of Leah, from whom it took its name. However, Arthur Peake (1919) suggested that the narratives about the twelve sons of Jacob in Genesis might include later tribal history "disguised as personal history," in which the later histories of these tribal groups are recast in the form of narratives about supposed ancestors. Likewise, the consensus position of contemporary scholarship is that "there is little or no historical memory of pre-Israelite events or circumstances in Genesis." In the biblical account, following the completion of the conquest of Canaan by the Israelites, Joshua allocated the land among the twelve tribes. Kenneth Kitchen, a well-known conservative biblical scholar, dates this event to slightly after 1200 BCE. However, the consensus view of modern scholars is that the conquest of Joshua as described in the Book of Joshua never occurred.

Martin Noth argued that the six tribes that the Bible traces to Leah, including Simeon, were once part of an amphictyony prior to the later coalition of twelve tribes. According to Niels Peter Lemche, "Noth's amphictyonic hypothesis determined a whole generation of Old Testament scholars' way of thinking." However, more recently a large number of scholars have dissented from Noth's theory.

In the opening words of the Book of Judges, following the death of Joshua, the Israelites "asked the Lord" which tribe should be first to go to occupy its allotted territory, and the tribe of Judah was identified as the first tribe. According to this narrative, the tribe of Judah invited the tribe of Simeon to fight with them in alliance to secure each of their allotted territories.

However, the tribe of Simeon is not mentioned in the ancient Song of Deborah, generally considered one of the earliest-written parts of the Hebrew Bible, and the Jewish Encyclopedia (1906) claims that Simeon was probably "not always counted as a tribe." According to Israel Finkelstein, the south of Canaan, in which Simeon was situated, was simply an insignificant rural backwater at the time the poem was written. Another possibility is that Simeon, along with Judah, had simply not joined the Israelite confederacy at this point, or that they had seceded.

=== Family tree ===
		Simeon
Jemuel	Jamin	Ohad	Jakin	Zohar	Shaul

== Biblical narrative ==
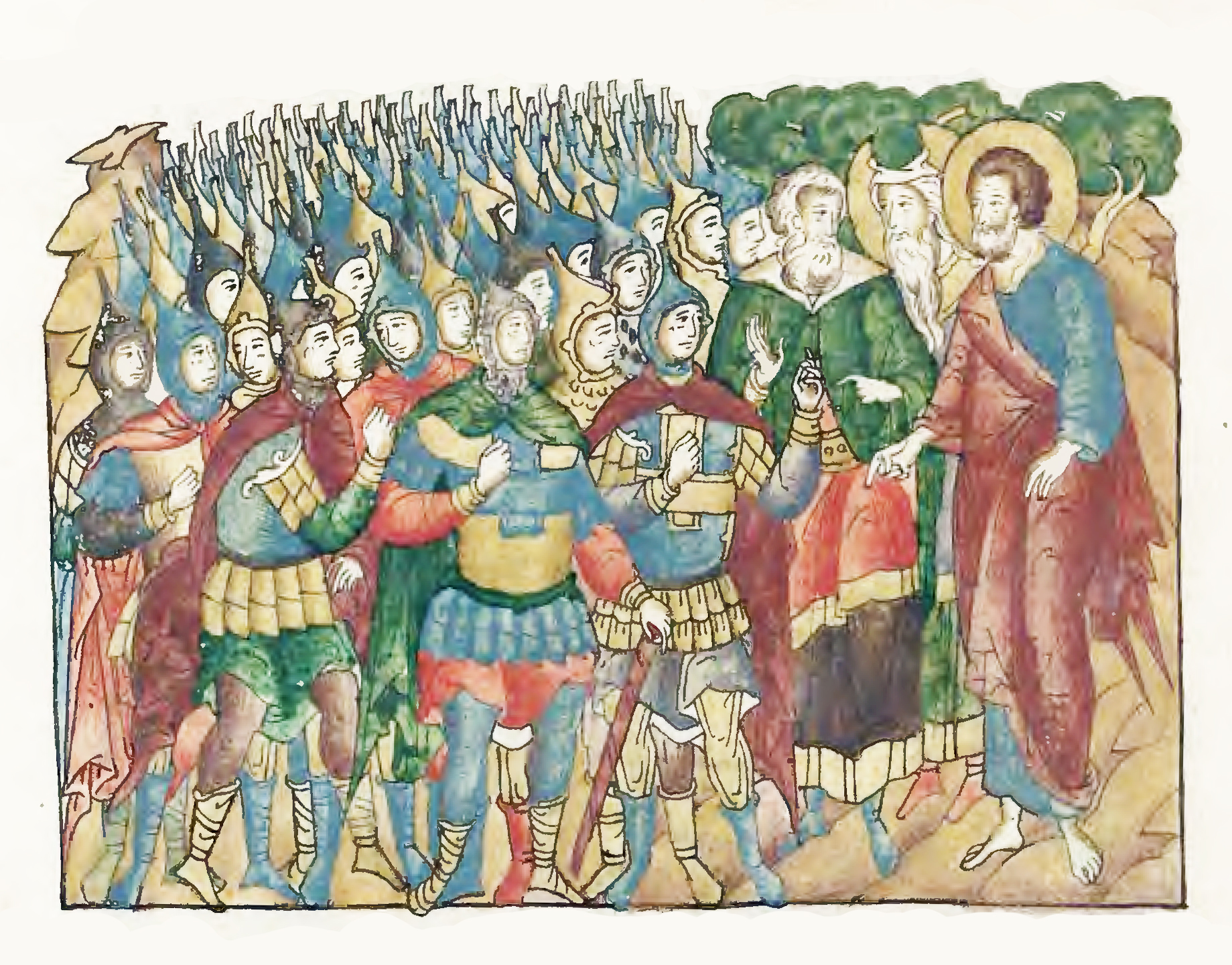
Moses and Aaron counting Simeon's tribe

Towns belonging to Simeon are listed in the Book of Joshua; elsewhere in Joshua these towns are ascribed to Judah. Most modern scholars view the Book of Joshua as being spliced together from several different source texts, in this particular case, the lists of towns being different documents, from different periods to each other.

The tribe seems to have dwindled in size, and the size of the tribe dramatically drops by over half between the two censuses recorded in the Book of Numbers. Although the Bible places these censuses during the Exodus, some source-critical scholars place their authorship in the period of Priestly Source, which Richard Elliot Freedman dates to between 722 and 609 BC. Other scholars usually place the Priestly Source in the post-exilic period, and some deny its existence altogether. The tribe is included in the Blessing of Moses (DEU 33:6) as found in the Septuagint, whereas the name is omitted from the Masoretic Text.

The impression gained from the Books of Chronicles is that the tribe was not entirely fixed in location; at one point it is mentioned that some members of the tribe migrated southwards to Gedor, so as to find suitable pasture for their sheep. In the following verse, which may or may not be related, it is mentioned that during the reign of Hezekiah, part of the tribe came to the land of some Meunim, and slaughtered them, taking the land in their place. Further verses state that about 500 men from the tribe migrated to Mount Seir, slaughtering the Amalekites who had previously settled there.

As part of the Kingdom of Judah, whatever remained of Simeon was ultimately subjected to the Babylonian captivity; when the captivity ended, all remaining distinctions between Simeon and the other tribes in the kingdom of Judah had been lost in favour of a common identity as Jews.

In Revelation 7:7, the Tribe of Simeon is once again listed among the Twelve Tribes of Israel with 12,000 of the sons of Israel from the tribe sealed on the forehead.

== Extrabiblical sources ==
According to a Midrash, many Simeonite widows were married into other Israelite tribes, after the death of 24,000 Simeonite men following the scandal involving Zimri.

A midrash claims that the tribe was deported by the Babylonians to the Kingdom of Aksum (in what is now Ethiopia), to a place behind the dark mountains. Conversely, Eldad ha-Dani held that the tribe of Simeon had become quite powerful, taking tribute from 25 other kingdoms, some of which were Arabians; though he names their location, surviving versions of his manuscripts differ as to whether it was the land of the Khazars or of the Chaldeans (Chaldeans would be an anachronism, though it could possibly refer to Buyid Dynasty Persia).
