= Tribe of Issachar =

One of the twelve Tribes of Israel

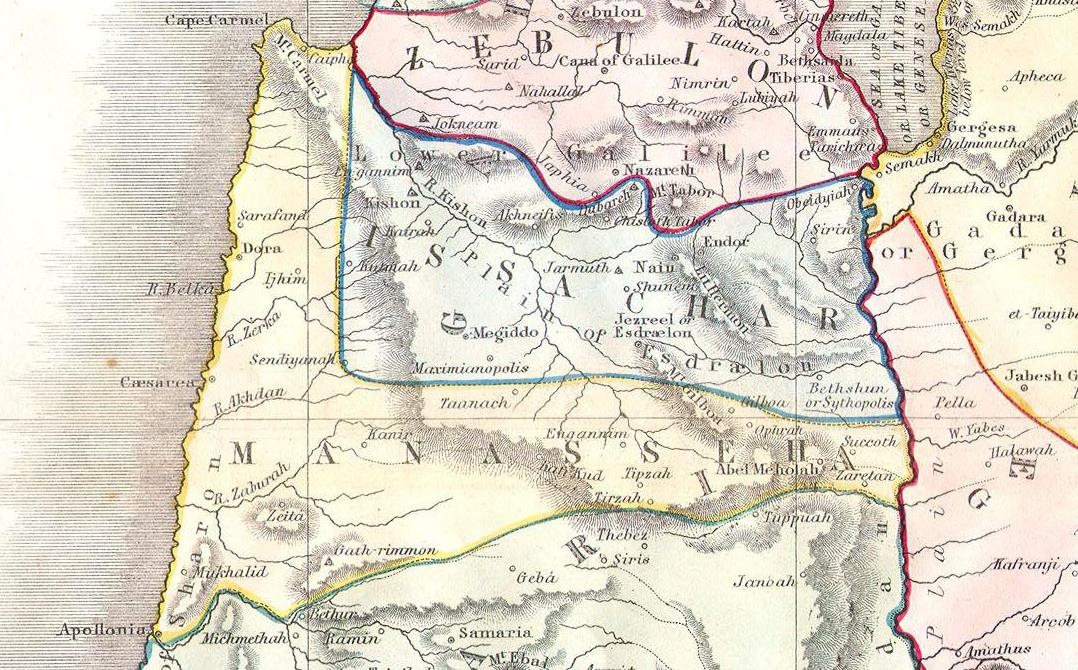
Map of ancient Land of Israel, with the territory of Issachar shaded blue.

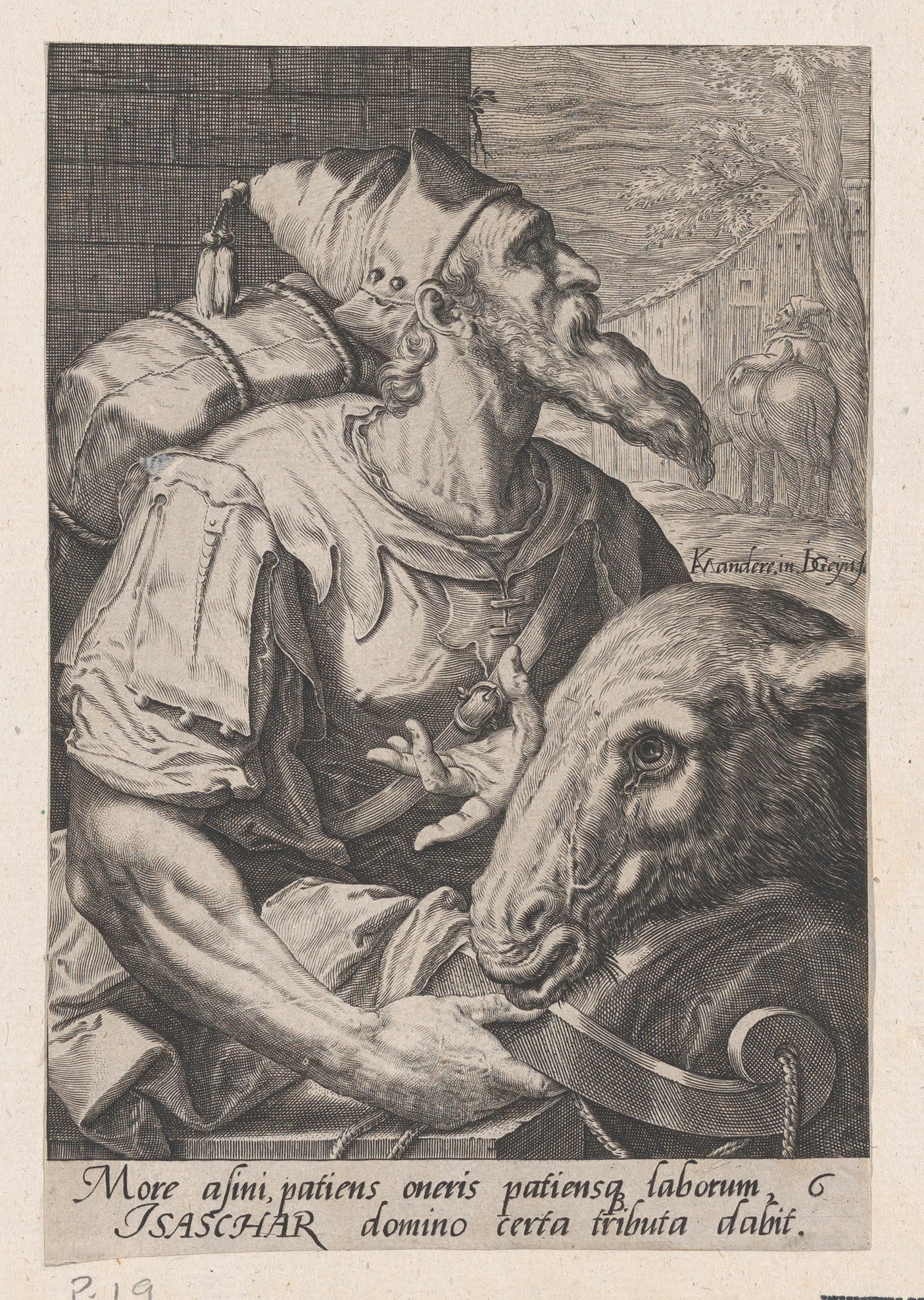
Issachar (print by Jacob de Gheyn II)

According to the Hebrew Bible, the Tribe of Issachar (Hebrew: יִשָּׂשכָר/יִשְׂשָׂכָר, Modern: Yīssaḵar, Tiberian: Yīssāḵār) was one of the twelve tribes of Israel and one of the ten lost tribes. In Jewish tradition, the descendants of Issachar were seen as being dominated by religious scholars and influential in proselytism. The sons of Issachar, ancestors of the tribe, were Tola, Phuvah, Job and Shimron.

== Biblical narrative ==
In the biblical narrative of the Book of Joshua, following the completion of the conquest of Canaan by the Israelite tribes, Joshua allocated the land among the twelve tribes. The territory allocated to Issachar stretched from the Jordan River in the east to Mount Carmel on the west, near to the Mediterranean coast, including the fertile Esdraelon plain between present-day Lower Galilee and Samaria. It was bounded on the east by East Manasseh, the south by West Manasseh, and the north by Zebulun and Naphtali. There is a consensus among scholars that the accounts in the Book of Judges are not historically reliable. Alternatively, scholars and historians such as Barry G. Webb believe Judges to be a challenging book to parse and grasp, but nevertheless believe it possesses substantially greater historicity than most modern secular scholars give it credit for.

1 Chronicles 7:1–5 lists the generations of the tribe of Issachar, totaling 87,000 "mighty men of valour". 1 Chronicles 12:32 describes the tribe as men who "had understanding of the times, to know what Israel ought to do". W. E. Barnes, writing in the Cambridge Bible for Schools and Colleges argues that "times" are "opportunities", and the phrase means, therefore, "men of experience, having knowledge of the world". The Tribe of Issachar and the Tribe of Simeon are the only tribes that have not been criticized for failing to complete the conquest of their land in the land of Canaan at the beginning of the Book of Judges.

R' David Kimchi (ReDaK) to I Chronicles 9:1 expounds that there remained from the tribes of Ephraim, Manasseh, Issachar and Zebulun in the territory of Judah after the exile of the ten tribes. This remnant returned with the tribe of Judah after the Babylonian exile.

== Rabbinic literature ==
Map of the Twelve Tribes of Israel per the Book of Joshua; Issachar's supposed territory is shaded red. Scholars generally agree that Joshua is not a reliable source for reconstructing the history of the period it describes.

The tribe of Issachar is particularly represented as one which consisted mostly of scholars, to which there is said to be an allusion in 1 Chron. 12:32. According to Rava, there was not to be found a Jewish student that was not a descendant either of Levi or of Issachar (Yoma 26a). The passage of Jacob's blessing referring to Issachar (Gen. 49:14-15) is interpreted as an allusion to the study of Torah, with which the people of that tribe occupied themselves (Genesis Rabba 98:17; compare also pseudo-Jonathan and Rashi ad loc.). The tribe of Issachar is also said to have been most influential in making proselytes (Gen. R. 98:12; comp. Sifre, Deut. 364). Although Issachar was the ninth son of Jacob, the prince of his tribe was the second to bring the offering for the dedication of the altar (Numbers 7:18-23), because the tribe was well versed in Torah (Gen. R. 72:4). The Midrash finds in the details of the offering various allusions to the Torah (Numbers Rabba 8:15). The tribe of Issachar advised the others to bring six covered wagons and twelve oxen (Num. 7:3) on which to load the parts of the Tabernacle (Num. R. 7:19). The 200 chiefs of Issachar (I Chron. 12:32) were leaders of the Sanhedrin, whose decisions were implicitly accepted by their brethren (Gen. R. 72:5, 98:17). The wise men consulted by Ahasuerus (Esther 1:13) were people of Issachar (Esther Rabba 4). The tribe is also represented as having been rich (comp. Targum Onkelos to Gen. 49:14); and its members figure as persons who united wealth and learning (Bava Kamma 17a). Yet, because they studied the Torah under favorable conditions, they only produced 200 chiefs of the Sanhedrin - whereas the tribe of Naphtali, who studied it under difficulties, produced 1,000 (Song of Songs Rabba 8:14).

== Family tree ==
	Issachar	Aridah
Tola	Puah	Jashub	Shimron
