= Tribe of Ephraim =

One of the two Half-Tribes of Joseph

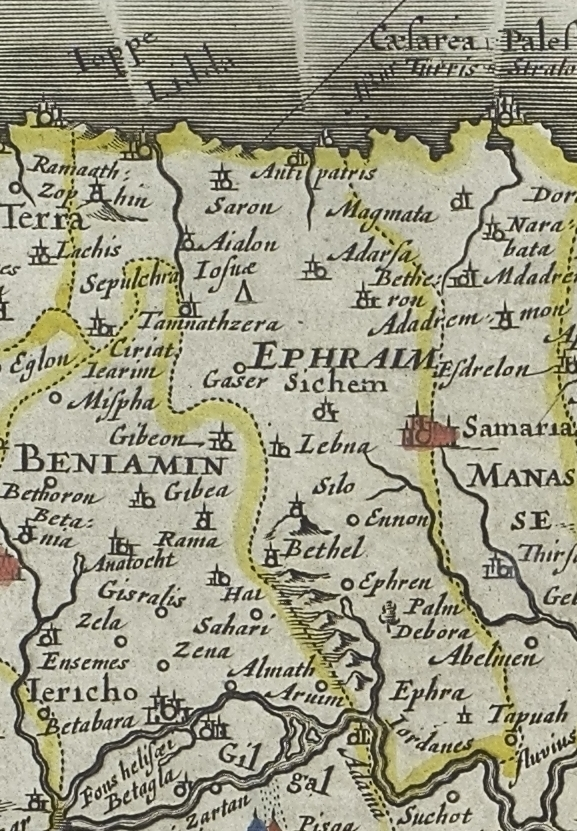
Map of Ephraim, 17th century Dutch map

According to the Hebrew Bible, the Tribe of Ephraim (Hebrew: אֶפְרַיִם, ʾEp̄rayim, in pausa: אֶפְרָיִם, ʾEp̄rāyim) was one of the Twelve Tribes of Israel. The Tribe of Manasseh, together with Ephraim, formed the Tribe of Joseph. It is one of the Ten Lost Tribes. The etymology of the name is disputed.

== Ephraim as portrayed in biblical narrative ==
According to the Bible, the Tribe of Ephraim is descended from a man named Ephraim, who is recorded as the son of Joseph, the son of Jacob, and Asenath, the daughter of Potiphera. The descendants of Joseph formed two of the tribes of Israel, whereas the other sons of Jacob were the founders of one tribe each.

The Bible records that the Tribe of Ephraim entered the land of Canaan during its conquest by Joshua, a descendant of Ephraim himself. However, many archeologists have abandoned the idea that Joshua carried out a conquest of Canaan similar to that described in the Book of Joshua, seeing Jews instead as indigenous Canaanites who developed a monotheistic religion over time.

From Joshua to the formation of the first Kingdom of Israel, the Tribe of Ephraim was a part of a loose confederation of Israelite tribes. No central government existed, and in times of crisis the people were led by ad hoc leaders known as the Judges, or shofeṭim, which are known from related societies from Canaan and their colonies in Carthage

With the growth of the threat from Philistine incursions, the Israelite tribes decided to form a strong centralised monarchy to meet the challenge. The Tribe of Ephraim joined the new kingdom with Saul as the first king. The widely accepted date for Saul's reign is approximately 1025–1005 BCE. Some scholars dispute this date range and place Saul later, perhaps as late as "the second half of the tenth century B.C.E."

After the death of Saul, the Bible records that all the tribes except Judah remained loyal to the House of Saul. After the death of Ish-bosheth, Saul's son and successor to the throne of Israel, the Tribe of Ephraim joined the other northern Israelite tribes in making David, who was then the king of Judah, the king of a reunited kingdom. According to archaeologist Israel Finkelstein, there is doubt about whether the biblical ordering of the reigns of the early monarchs is reliable, and that the sequence preserved in the Bible, in which David follows Saul as king of Israel, may not be historically accurate.

However, on the accession of Rehoboam, David's grandson, in c. 930 BCE, the northern tribes split from the House of David to form the Northern Kingdom, known as both "Israel" and "Samaria". The first northern king of Israel was an Ephraimite, Jeroboam, who likely ruled in 931–909.

The accents of the tribes were distinctive enough even at the time of the confederacy so that when the Israelites of Gilead, under the leadership of Jephthah, fought the Tribe of Ephraim, their pronunciation of shibboleth as sibboleth was considered sufficient evidence to single out individuals from Ephraim, so that they could be subjected to immediate death by the Israelites of Gilead.

Ephraim was a member of the Northern Kingdom until the kingdom was conquered by the Neo-Assyrian Empire in c. 723 BCE and the population deported, an event known as the Assyrian captivity. From that time, the Tribe of Ephraim has been counted as one of the Ten Lost Tribes.

Ephraim is often seen as the tribe that embodies the entire northern kingdom and the House of Omri resided in the tribe's territory just as Judah is the tribe that embodies the Kingdom of Judah and provided its royal family.

== Tribal territory ==
In the biblical account, following the completion of the conquest of Canaan by Joshua allocated the land among the Twelve Tribes. Kenneth Kitchen, a well-known Biblical maximalist, dated this event to slightly after 1200 BCE. However, the consensus of modern scholars is that the conquest of Joshua as described in the Book of Joshua never occurred.

As recorded in the Book of Joshua, the territory allocated to the Tribe of Ephraim was at the center of Canaan, west of the Jordan, south of the territory of Manasseh, and north of the Tribe of Benjamin. The region later named Samaria, which was distinct from Judea and Galilee, consisted mostly of Ephraim's territory. The area was mountainous, giving it protection, and also highly fertile, giving prosperity,

Map of the twelve tribes of Israel; Ephraim in the west is shaded a pale yellow

The territory of Ephraim contained the early centers of Israelite religion: Shechem and Shiloh. These factors contributed to making Ephraim the dominant tribe in the United Kingdom of Israel, and led to Ephraim becoming a synonym for the entire kingdom. Joshua 16:1-4 outlines the borders of the lands allocated to the "children of Joseph", i.e. Ephraim and Manasseh combined, and Joshua 16:5-8 defines the borders of the land allocated to the tribe of Ephraim in more detail.

Bethel was allocated by Joshua to the Tribe of Benjamin. However, even by the time of the prophetess Deborah, Bethel is described as being in the land of the Tribe of Ephraim. Some twenty years after the breakup of the United Monarchy, King Abijah of Judah, the second king of the Kingdom of Judah, defeated Jeroboam, king of Israel-Samaria, and took back Bethel, Jeshanah and Ephron with their surrounding villages. Ephron is believed to be the Ophrah that was also allocated to the Tribe of Benjamin by Joshua.

The wadi Qānā (Hebrew: נַ֨חַל קָנָ֜ה, romanized: naḥal Qānā) of Joshua 17:9 divided Ephraim's territory to the south and Manasseh's territory to the north. The illegal Israeli settlement of Karnei Shomron is built near this gulch, which runs in an easterly-westerly direction.

The border of Ephraim extended from the Jordan in the east to the Mediterranean Sea in the west. It incorporated within it the cities of Bethel (now Beitin), ʻAtarot, Lower Beth-Ḥoron (now Lower Bayt ʻUr), extending as far as Gezer (now Abu Shusha, formerly known as "Tell el Jezer") and the Mediterranean Sea. Gezer was said to have been inhabited by Canaanites long after Joshua had either killed or expelled the other Canaanites. According to French archaeologist, Charles Simon Clermont-Ganneau, who identified the site in 1871 and later carried out excavations there, Gezer marked the extreme western point of the territory of Ephraim, and was "situated at the actual intersection of the boundaries of Ephraim, Dan and Judah." This view, however, does not seem to be supported by the Scriptures themselves which place the extent of Ephraim's border at the sea. Josephus noted, "The tribe of Ephraim had by lot the land that extended in length from the river Jordan to Gezer; but in breadth as far as from Bethel, till it ended at the Great Plain."

The traveller Benjamin of Tudela, a Jew from the Kingdom of Navarre, wrote that the southernmost bounds of the territory of Ephraim extended in a southwesterly direction as far as the town of Ibelin (now Yibna).

== Origin ==
According to the Torah, the tribe consisted of descendants of Ephraim a son of Joseph, from whom it took its name; however some critical scholars view this also as postdiction, an eponymous metaphor providing an aetiology of the connectedness of the tribe to others in the Israelite confederation. In the Biblical account, Joseph is one of the two children of Rachel and Jacob, a brother to Benjamin, and father to both Ephraim, and his first son, Manasseh; although Manasseh was the eldest, Jacob foresaw that Ephraim's descendants would be greater than his brother's.

Though the biblical descriptions of the geographic boundary of the House of Joseph are fairly consistent, the descriptions of the boundaries between Manasseh and Ephraim are not, and each is portrayed as having exclaves within the territory of the other. Furthermore, in the Blessing of Jacob, and elsewhere ascribed by textual scholars to a similar or earlier time period, Ephraim and Manasseh are treated as a single tribe, with Joseph appearing in their place. From this it is regarded as probable that originally Ephraim and Manasseh were considered one tribe — that of Joseph. According to several biblical scholars, Benjamin was also originally part of the House of Joseph, but the biblical account of this became lost; Benjamin being differentiated by being that part of Ephraim (House of Joseph) which joined the Kingdom of Judah rather than that of Israel.

A number of biblical scholars suspect that the Joseph tribes (including Benjamin) represent a second migration of Israelites to Israel, later than the main tribes, specifically that it was only the Joseph tribes which went to Egypt and returned, while the main Israelite tribes simply emerged as a subculture from the Canaanites and had remained in Canaan throughout; in the narrative in the Book of Joshua, which concerns the arrival in (and conquest of) Canaan by the Israelites from Egypt, the leader is Joshua, who was a member of the Ephraim tribe. According to this view, the story of Jacob's visit to Laban to obtain a wife began as a metaphor for the second migration, with Jacob's new family, possessions, and livestock, obtained from Laban, being representations of the new wave of migrants;

Professor David Frankel believes that ancient traditions regarding pre-conquest Ephraimite settlement in Canaan were unintentionally preserved in biblical passages such as 1 Chronicles 7:20-24. In 1 Chronicles 7:20-24, Ephraim's descendants, Ezer and Elead, were Canaanite residents who were killed by the Philistines, which was mourned by Ephraim and his brethren. This Ephraim was believed to be different from the more famous Ephraim and his brethren were believed to be the heads of other Israelite tribes. Professor Nili Wazana connects this with Prime Minister David Ben-Gurion's argument for why the Jews were indigenous to Canaan, which was affirmed in the Israeli Declaration of Independence. Ben-Gurion argued that Abraham's migration to Canaan was a "renuion with indigenous Hebrews who shared his theological belief" and that not all Hebrews joined Jacob's family when they migrated to Egypt.

== Character ==
In the account of the deuteronomic history, Ephraim is portrayed as domineering, haughty, discontented, and jealous, but in classical rabbinical literature, the biblical founder of the tribe is described as being modest and not selfish. These rabbinical sources allege that it was on account of modesty and selflessness, and a prophetic vision of Joshua, that Jacob gave Ephraim precedence over Manasseh, the elder of the two; in these sources, Jacob is regarded as sufficiently just that God upholds the blessing in his honour, and makes Ephraim the leading tribe. Nevertheless, other classical rabbinical texts mock the tribe for the character it has in the deuteronomic history, claiming that Ephraim, being headstrong, left Egypt 30 years prior to the Exodus, and on arrival in Canaan was subjected to a disastrous battle with the Philistines; in the Midrashic Jasher this is portrayed as a rebellion of Ephraim against God, resulting in the slaying of all but 10, and the bleached bones of the slaughtered being strewn across the roads, so much so that the circuitous route of the Exodus was simply an attempt by God to prevent the Israelites from having to suffer the sight of the remains.

Though from the point of view of an increasing majority of archaeologists, there were always two distinct cultures in Canaan, a strong and prosperous northern kingdom and a weaker and poorer southern one, in the Biblical account the Israelite tribes were initially united in a single kingdom, and only later fractured into the northern and southern kingdoms; this fracture is blamed by the Bible on the jealousy of Ephraim over the growing power of Judah. In the Book of Chronicles, Ephraim's act of splintering from Judah is denounced as forsaking God, and Ephraim is portrayed as becoming highly irreligious, particularly in their resistance to the reforms enacted by Hezekiah and Josiah.

It was not until the close of the first period of Jewish history that God 'refused the tabernacle of Joseph (Hebrew Bible), and chose not the tribe of Ephraim, but chose the tribe of Judah, the Mount Zion which he loved'. When the Ark was removed from Shiloh to Zion the power of Ephraim was sequestered.

== Destiny ==
As part of the Kingdom of Israel, the territory of Ephraim was conquered by the Assyrians, and the tribe was mostly exiled; some in the tribe managed to flee to the Kingdom of Judah, which lay just south of the territory of Ephraim. In any case, the manner of their exile and/or dispersal led to their further history being lost. However, several modern day groups claim descent, with varying levels of academic and rabbinical support. The Samaritans claim that some of their adherents are descended from this tribe, and many Persian Jews claim to be descendants of Ephraim. Further afield, in India the Telugu Jews claim descent from Ephraim, and call themselves Bene Ephraim, relating similar traditions to those of the Mizo Jews, whom the modern state of Israel regards as descendants of Manasseh.

The Church of Jesus Christ of Latter-day Saints teaches that a significant portion of its members are descended from or adopted into the tribe of Ephraim, believing that they are charged with restoring the lost tribes in the latter days, as prophesied by Isaiah. Along with members of the tribe of Judah, members of the tribe of Ephraim are believed to be playing important leadership roles for covenant Israel in the last days. They also believe that the main groups of the Book of Mormon (Nephites and Lamanites) were parts of the tribes of Ephraim and Manasseh, as part fulfilment of the blessing of Jacob: "Joseph is a fruitful bough, even a fruitful bough by a well; whose branches run over the wall", interpreting the "wall" as the ocean).
