= Tribe of Joseph =

One of the twelve Tribes of Israel

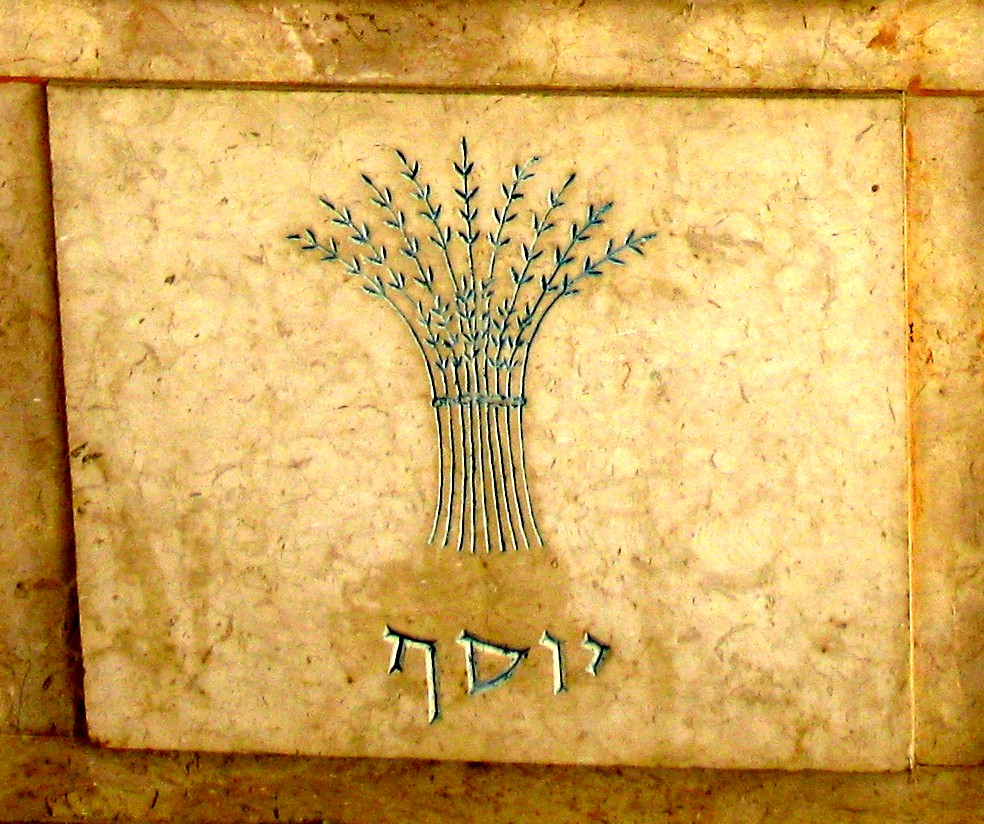
Synagogue in Bnei Brak with the name of Joseph and his symbol, a sheaf of wheat.

According to the Hebrew Bible, the Tribe of Joseph is one of the Twelve Tribes of Israel. Since the tribes of Ephraim and Manasseh (often called the "two half-tribes of Joseph") together constituted the "tribe of Joseph", it was often not listed as one of the tribes, in favour of Ephraim and Manasseh being listed in its place; consequently it was often termed the House of Joseph, to avoid the use of the term tribe. Even though Ephraim and Manasseh were Joseph’s sons, they were considered heads of two of the twelve tribes of Israel because Joseph’s father, Jacob (renamed in later life by God as “Israel”), adopted Ephraim and Manasseh as his own sons (Genesis 48:1-16).

According to the Targum Pseudo-Jonathan, the ensign of both the House of Joseph (Ephraim and Manasseh) and the Tribe of Benjamin was of silk of three colours, corresponding with the precious stones in the priestly breastplate, leshem, shəvo, and aḥlamah (amber, agate, and amethyst); and upon it expressed and set forth the names of the three tribes, Ephraim, Manasseh and Benjamin; having the figure of a young man upon it, with the inscription: "And the Cloud of the LORD was over them by day, when they set forward from the camp." (Numbers 10:34).

There were obvious linguistic differences between at least one portion of Joseph and the other Israelite tribes. At the time when Ephraim were at war with the Israelites of Gilead, under the leadership of Jephthah, the pronunciation of shibboleth as sibboleth was considered sufficient evidence to single out individuals from Ephraim, so that they could be subjected to immediate death by the Israelites of Gilead.

At its height, the territory of Joseph spanned the Jordan River, the eastern portion being almost entirely discontiguous from the western portion, only slightly touching at one corner—northeast of the western portion and southwest of the eastern portion. The western portion was at the centre of Canaan, west of the Jordan, between the Tribe of Issachar on the north, and the Tribe of Benjamin on the south; the region which was later named Samaria (as distinguished from Judea or Galilee) mostly consisted of the western portion of Joseph. The eastern portion of Joseph was the northernmost Israelite group on the east of the Jordan, occupying the land north of the tribe of Gad, extending from the Mahanaim in the south to Mount Hermon in the north, and including within it the whole of Bashan. These territories abounded in water, a precious commodity in Canaan, and the mountainous portions not only afforded protection, but happened to be highly fertile; early centres of Israelite religion—Shechem and Shiloh—were additionally situated in the region. The territory of Joseph was thus one of the most valuable parts of the country, and the House of Joseph became the most dominant group in the united Kingdom of Israel.

== Origin ==
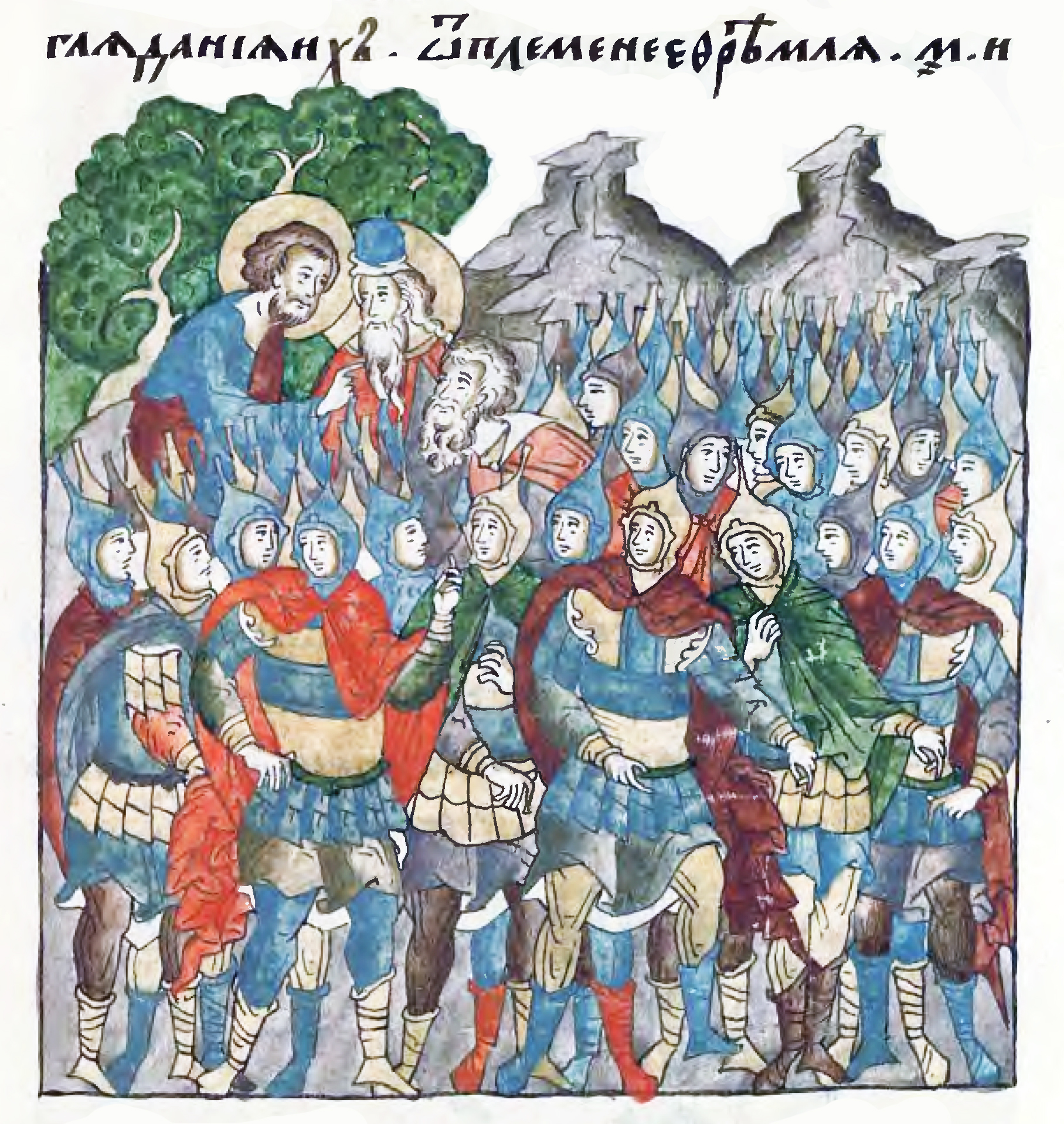
Moses counting Joseph's kin

According to the Old Testament, the tribe consisted of descendants of Joseph, a son of Jacob and Rachel, from whom it took its name; however, some Biblical scholars view this also as postdiction, an eponymous metaphor providing an aetiology of the connectedness of the tribe to others in the Israelite confederation. In the Biblical account, Joseph was the brother to Benjamin, the other son of Rachel and Jacob and the eponym of the Tribe of Benjamin, which was located to the immediate south of the tribe of Joseph.

Though the biblical descriptions of the geographic boundary of the House of Joseph are fairly consistent, the descriptions of the boundaries between Manasseh and Ephraim are not, and each is portrayed as having exclaves within the territory of the other. In the Blessing of Jacob, and elsewhere ascribed by textual scholars to a similar or earlier time period, a single tribe of Joseph appears where passages written later place separate tribes of Ephraim and of Manasseh. From this scholars believe that Joseph was originally considered a single tribe, and only split into Ephraim and Manasseh later.

A number of biblical scholars and archaeologists (most notably William G. Dever) theorize that the Joseph tribes represent a second migration of Israelites to Israel, later than the main tribes; and that it was only the Joseph tribes who were enslaved into Egypt and returned, while the main Israelite tribes simply emerged as a subculture from the Canaanites and had remained in Canaan throughout. In the narrative in the Book of Joshua, which concerns the arrival in (and conquest of) Canaan by the Israelites from Egypt, the leader is Joshua, who was a member of the Ephraim tribe.

According to this view, the story of Jacob's visit to Laban to obtain a wife began as a metaphor for the second migration, with Jacob's new family, possessions, and livestock, obtained from Laban, being representations of the new wave of migrants. According to textual scholars, the Jahwist version of the story is notable as having only the Joseph tribes among these migrants, since it recounts only Jacob as having met Rachel, and the matriarchs of the other Israelite tribes—Leah, Bilhah, and Zilpah—do not appear.

== Fate ==
As part of the northern Kingdom of Israel, the territories of Manasseh and Ephraim were conquered by the Neo-Assyrian Empire, and the tribe was exiled; the manner of their exile led to their further history being lost.

Despite the loss of the additional history of Manasseh and Ephraim, several modern-day groups claim descent from them, with varying levels of academic and rabbinical support. The Yusufzai tribe (literal translation The Sons of Joseph) of the Pashtuns of Afghanistan, India and Pakistan, who collectively refer to themselves as the "Bani Israel", have a long tradition connecting them to the exiled Kingdom of Israel. The Samaritans claim that some of their adherents are descended from these tribes, and many Persian Jews claim to be descendants of Ephraim. Many Samaritans claim descent from the grandchildren of Joseph under four main septs, his grandsons Danfi, Tsedakah, Mafraj and Sarawi.

In Northeast India, the Mizo Jews claim descent from Manasseh and call themselves Bnei Menashe; in 2005 Shlomo Amar, Sephardi Chief Rabbi of Israel, announced that he regarded this claim to be true, which under the Law of Return allows them to migrate to Israel as long as they formally convert to Israel's Orthodox form of Judaism. Similar traditions are held by the Telugu Jews in South India, who claim descent from Ephraim and call themselves Bene Ephraim.

Considered less plausible by academic and Jewish authorities are the claims of several western Christian and related group. Some adherents of Messianic Judaism also identify as part of Joseph on the basis that, regardless of any genetic connection which may or may not exist, they observe the Torah and interpret parts of the Bible in certain ways.

=== The Church of Jesus Christ of Latter-day Saints ===
The Church of Jesus Christ of Latter-day Saints teaches that a significant portion of its members are descended from or adopted into the tribe of Ephraim, believing that they are charged with restoring the lost tribes in the latter days, as prophesied by Isaiah. Along with members of the tribe of Judah, members of the tribe of Ephraim are believed to be playing an important leadership roles for covenant Israel in the last days. Members' lineage is declared through patriarchal blessings.

Latter-day Saints also believe that the main groups of the Book of Mormon (Nephites and Lamanites) were part of the tribe of Manasseh. They believe that this would be the fulfilment of part of the blessing of Jacob, where it states that "Joseph is a fruitful bough, even a fruitful bough by a well; whose branches run over the wall" (Genesis 49:22, interpreting the "wall" as the ocean). The idea being that they were a branch of Israel that was carefully led to another land for their inheritance.

== See also ==
- Ephraim
- Joseph
- Manasseh
- Yousafzai 'Sons of Yusuf'
- House of Joseph (LDS Church)
- Gathering of Israel
