= Penuel =

Biblical place

Coordinates: 32°11′N 35°42′E

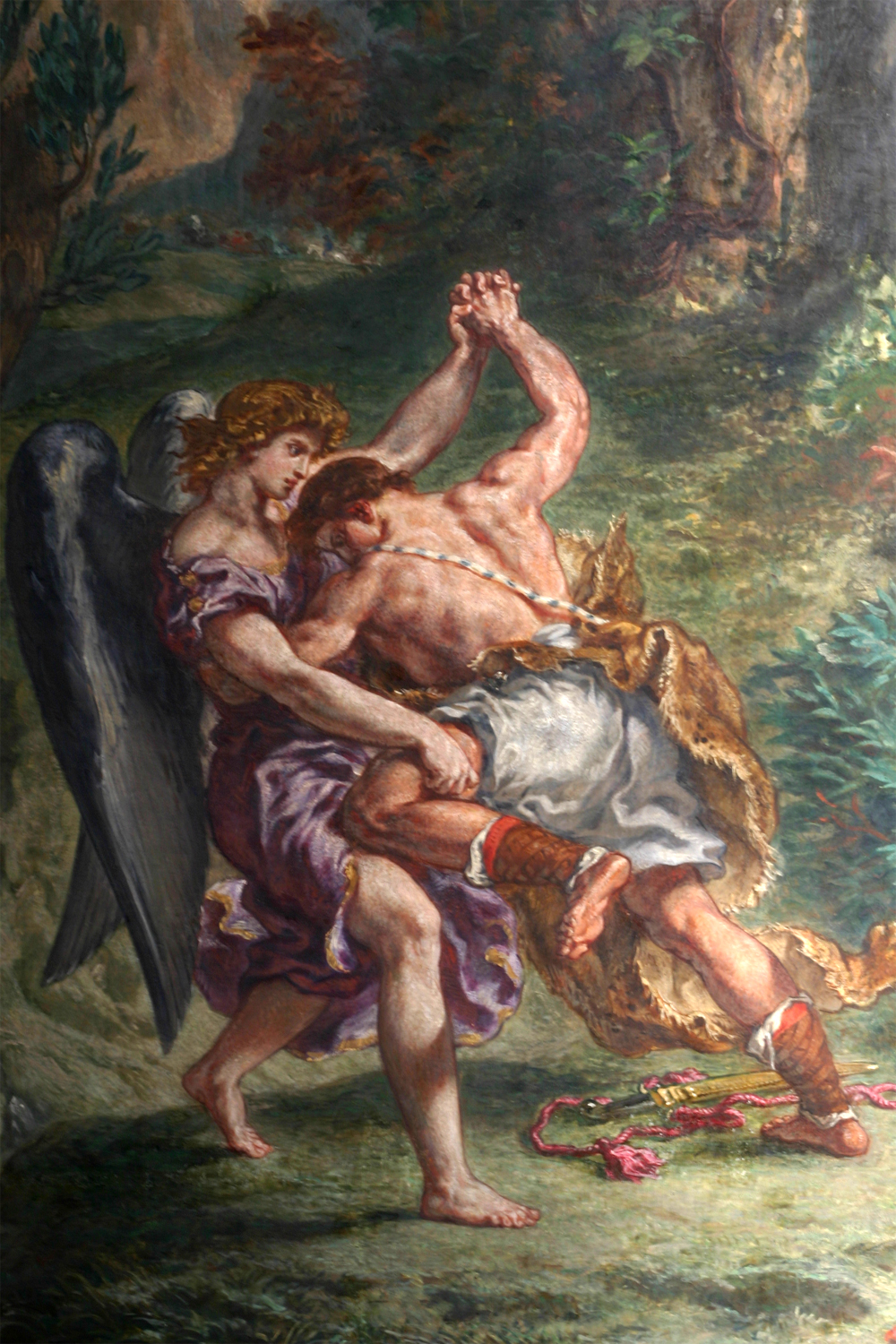
Depiction of Jacob wrestling with the angel at Penuel by Eugène Delacroix

Penuel (Biblical Hebrew: פְּנוּאֵל, romanized: Pənuʾēl), also called Peniel, is a place mentioned in the Book of Genesis as the site of Jacob's struggle with the angel. In 1 Kings, it is mentioned as a capital for Jeroboam, the first king of the Kingdom of Israel (Samaria), which he fortified. It is not far from Sukkot, on the east of the Jordan River, south of the biblical river Jabbok or modern river Zarqa in Jordan.

== Biblical narrative ==
According to the biblical narrative, Jacob and his family had left Paddan Aram and were travelling to Canaan, anxious because Jacob know that he would encounter his brother Esau on his journey. When they reached the Jabbok River, Jacob ensured that his family and possessions were safely transported across the river, but he himself remained alone on the northern side. There Jacob wrestled "until the breaking of the day" with a man (later identified as El), following which El changed Jacob's name to "Israel", a name explained as meaning "he who strives with God" (literally, "the prince that prevails with God"). The site was then named Peniel ("Face of El") by Jacob:

It is because I saw God face to face, and yet my life was spared.

— Genesis 32:30: NIV

Penuel is later mentioned in the Book of Judges. The men of this place refused to give bread to Gideon and his three hundred men when they were in pursuit of the Midianites in Judges 8:1–21. On his return, Gideon tore down the tower there and killed all the men of the city.

Later, Jeroboam, King of Israel-Samaria, established his capital in Shechem. A short time later, he left Shechem and fortified Penuel, declaring it as his new capital in 1 Kings 12:25. He and his son, Nadab, ruled there until Baasha seized the throne in 909 BCE and moved the capital to Tirzah in 1 Kings 15:25–34. In the scriptures, it is identified as both a site for the worship of El and Yahweh.

Some scholars consider that the material of Genesis 32–35, including the account of Jacob being renamed Israel at Penuel, may be a later addition that introduces a new power structure centered around the establishment of sacral places in the North (Penuel, Shechem and Bethel).

== Identification ==
Until 1970, biblical scholars identified Penuel with the twin peaks of Tulul adh-Dhahab in modern-day Jordan. Based on the account given in Genesis, scholars believed Penuel to be the location of a sacred sanctuary, and presumed that there must have been a temple from Iron Age I or earlier on one of the peaks. Since such a structure has not been found, this identification was questioned.

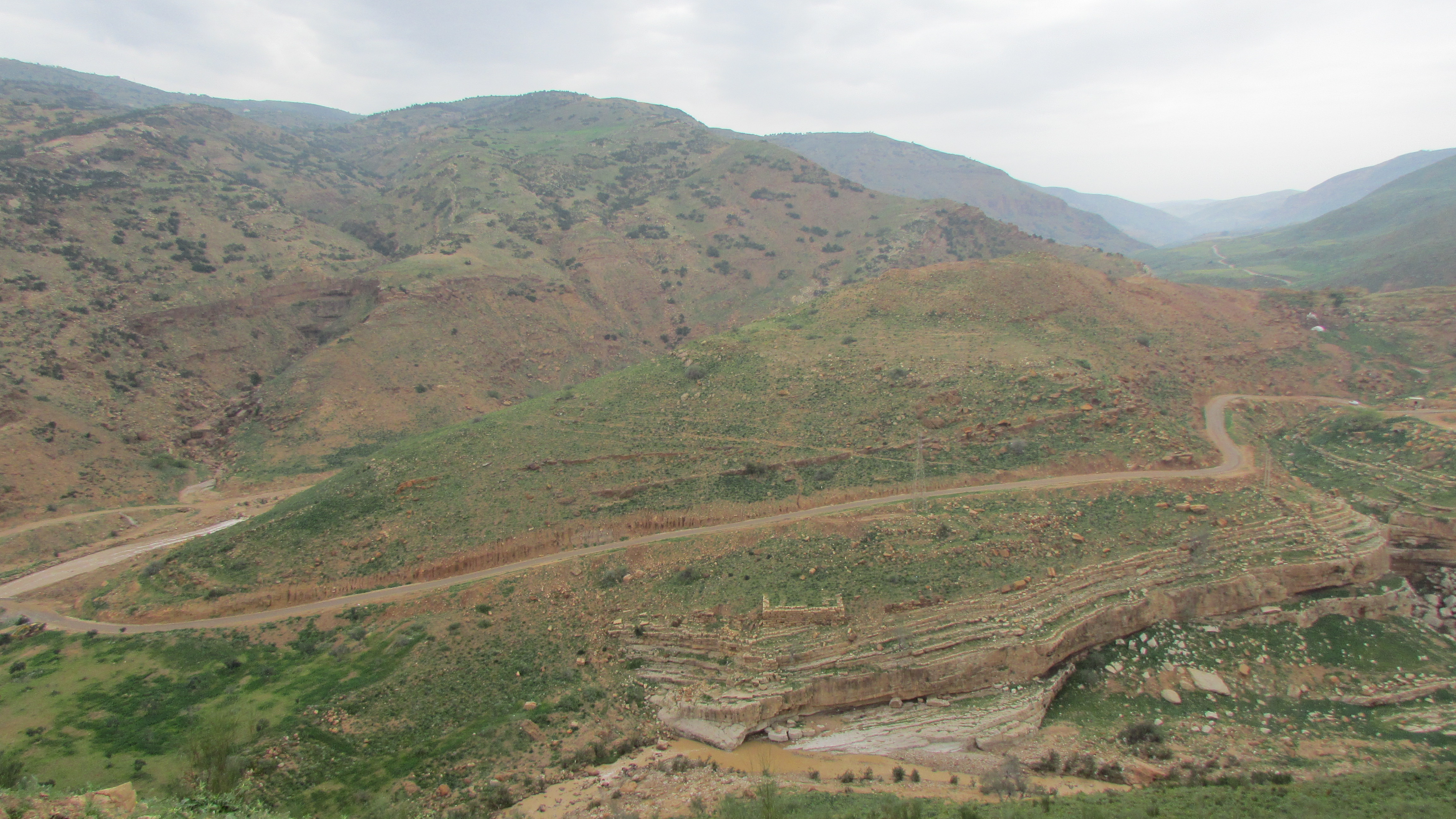
Tulul adh-Dhahab's Tell edh-Dhahab el-Sharqi, a proposed location for ancient Penuel

Contemporary Israeli archaeologist Israel Finkelstein suggested to see the twin peaks as two distinct sites that probably featured distinct names during antiquity. He suggested identifying the western, larger, Tell el-Dhahab al-Gharbi with Mahanaim and the eastern one, Tell edh-Dhahab el-Sharqi, with Penuel.

== See also ==
- Vayishlach, the Torah reading describing the events at Penuel
