= Damia =

Damia may refer to:

- Damia (novel) (1992) by Anne McCaffrey
- Damia, Jordan
- Damia (mythology), a Greek goddess
- Damia, the stage name of French singer Marie-Louise Damien (1889–1978)
- Damià, or Damià Abella, a former Spanish footballer.
- Damia, one of the Original Seven Dragoons in the video game The Legend of Dragoon
