= Tulul adh-Dhahab =

Archaeological site in Jordan

Tulul al-Dhahab
- تلول الذهب (Arabic)
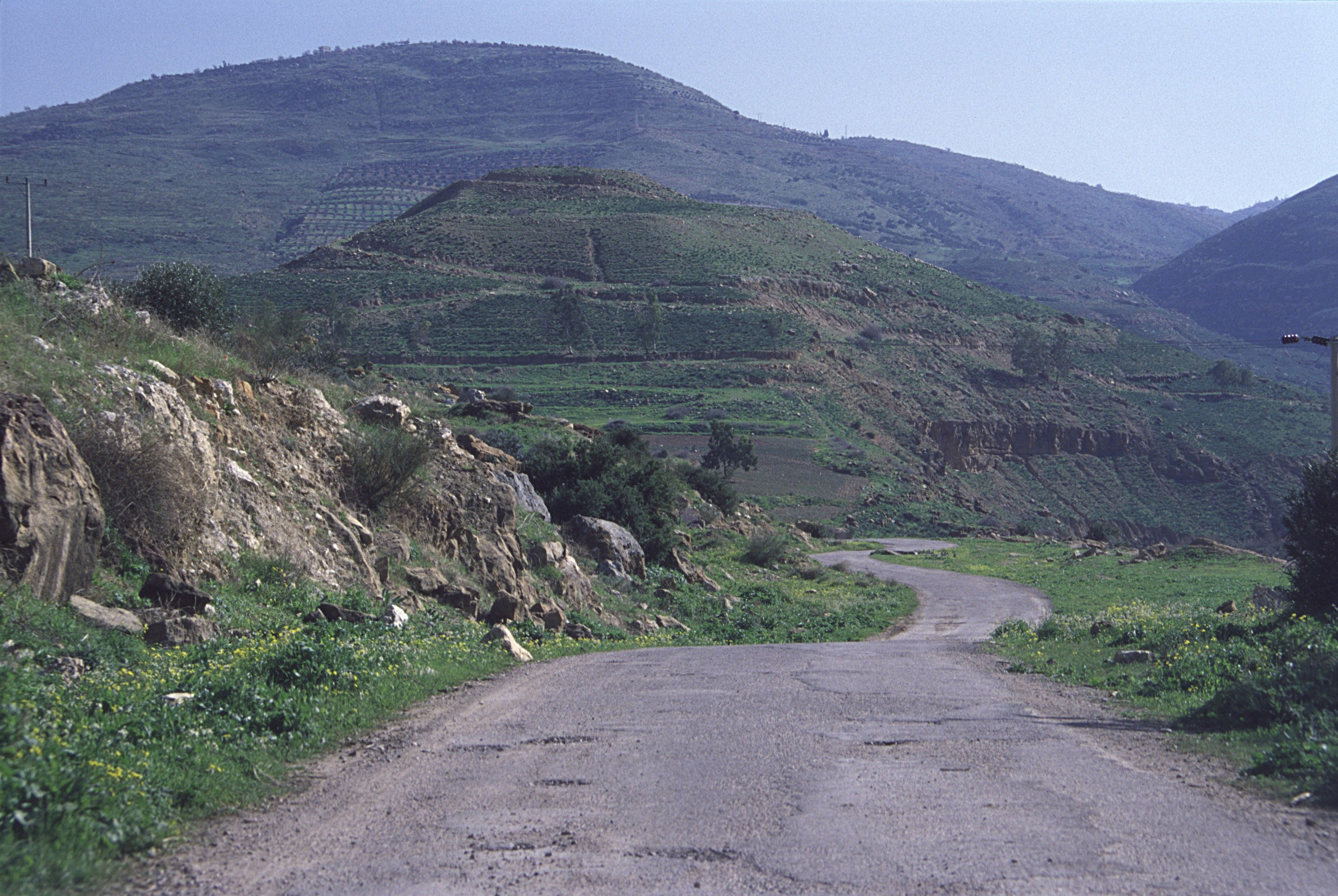
- Tulul adh-Dhahab in spring

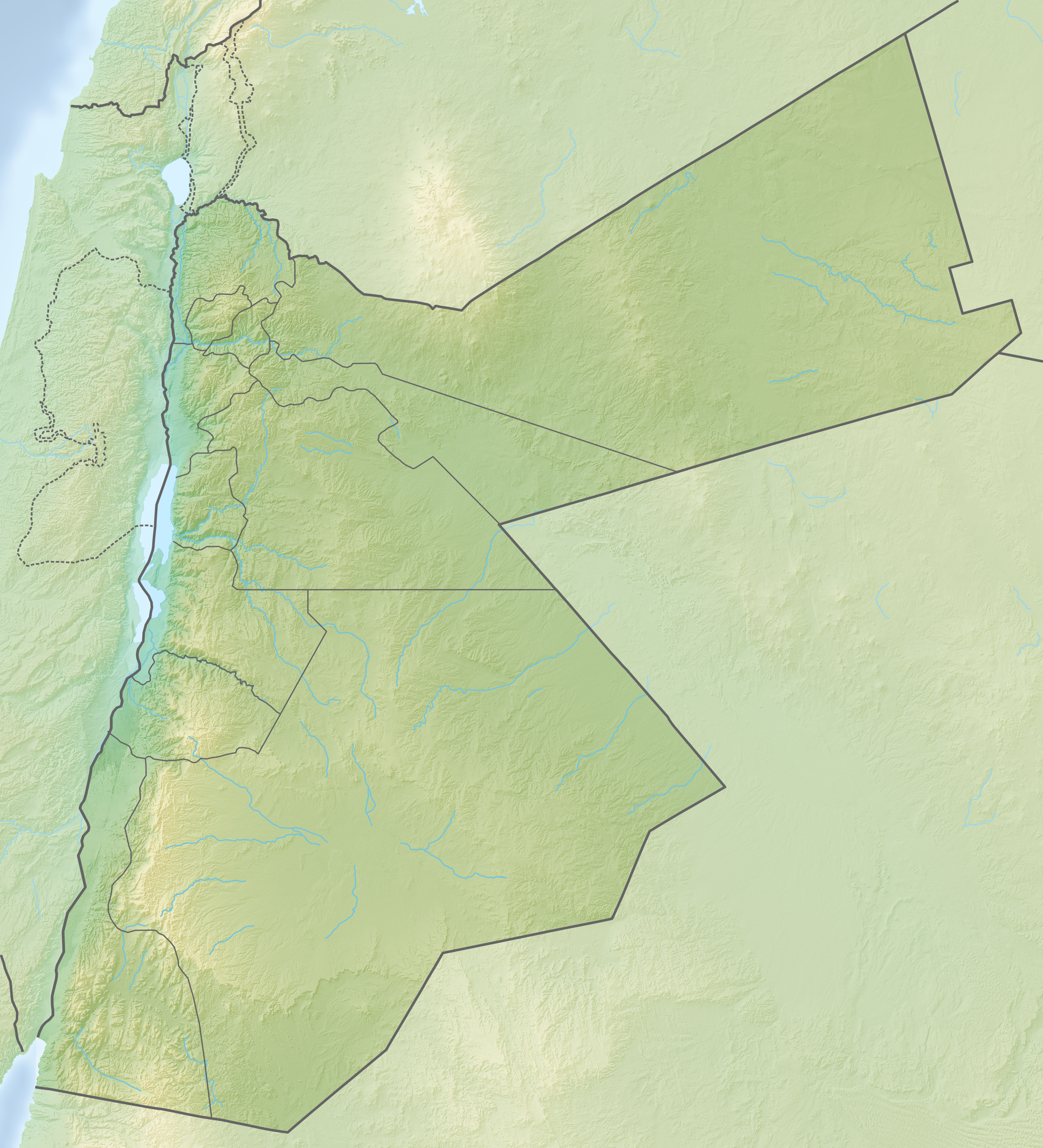
- Location within Jordan
- 32°11′08.3″N 35°41′11.8″E
- Type: Two tells
- Periods: Neolithic period, Late Bronze Age, Iron Age, Late Hellenistic period to Late Roman period
- Location: Jerash Governorate, Jordan
- Region: Gilead

Site notes
- Excavation dates: 1980/82, 2005-
- Archaeologists: Thomas Pola

The Tulul al-Dhahab (Arabic: تَّلَّيْن الذهب, romanized: Tullayn al-ḏahab, lit. 'the twin hills of gold'; Levantine Arabic: تلول الذهب, romanized: Təlūl əḏ-ḏahab) is an archaeological site in Jordan. The site features two neighboring tells, separated by the Zarqa River (the biblical River Jabbok), an affluent of the Jordan River. The two tells are commonly identified with the ancient Israelite cities of Mahanaim and Penuel, mentioned in the Hebrew Bible.

The western of the twin tells was populated at least from Late Bronze Age to late antiquity, maybe beginning as early as the Near Eastern Neolithic. After the collapse of the ancient buildings, probably by an earthquake in late antiquity, the site was abandoned. Perhaps because of its name, some parts of the western hill are severely damaged due to recent archaeological looting.

== Location ==
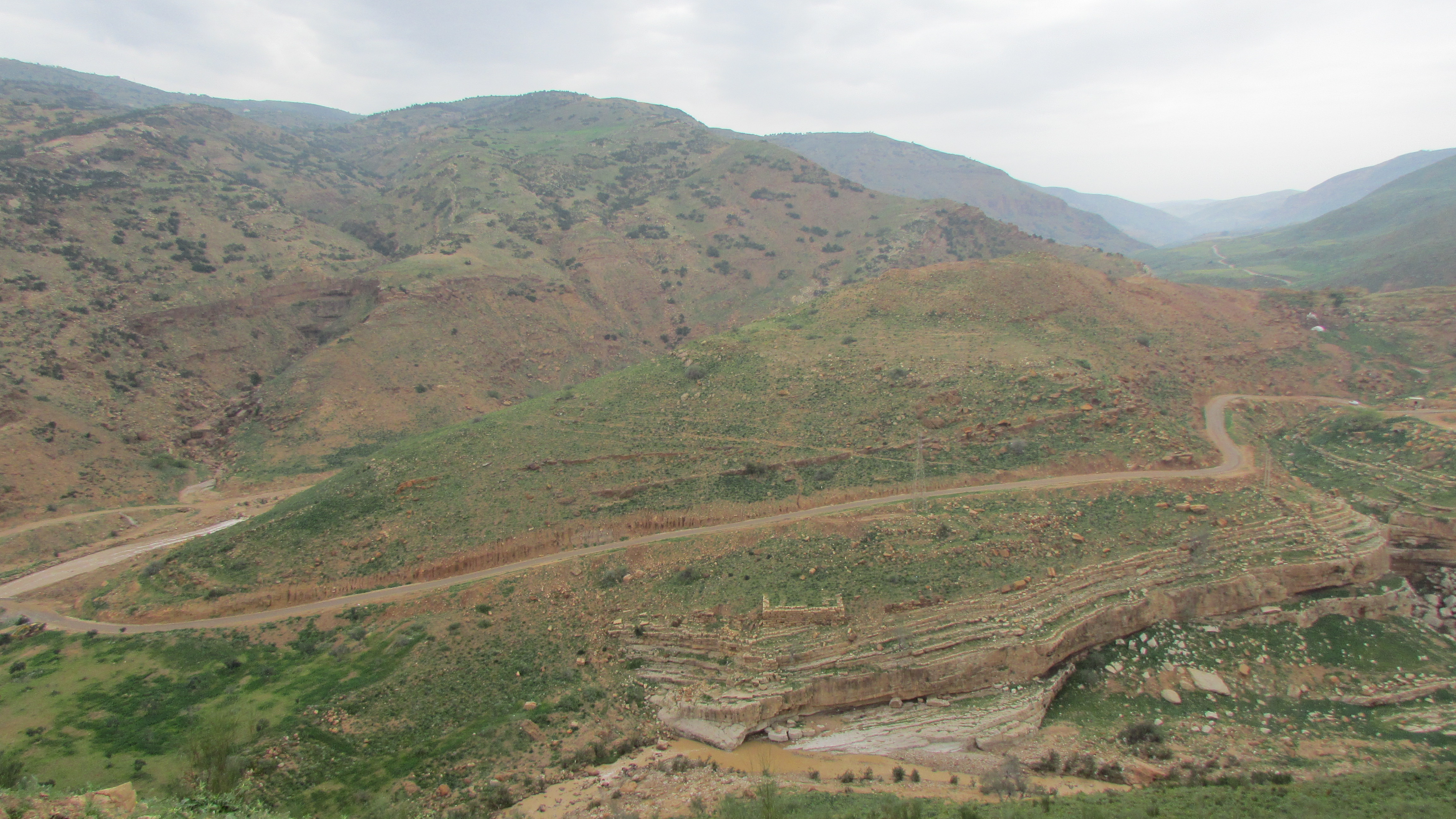
The eastern mound, Tell edh-Dhahab esh-Sharqi

The two hills (Levantine Arabic təlūl, formal tullayn) are situated in the Zarqa Valley at the opening of the southern Wadi Hajjaj. The hills, both of them bearing ruins, are approximately 120m above the riverbed and force the Zarqa on a winding course around them. The western, al-Gharbi, is larger and located on the north side of the U-shaped meander of the Zarqa. The eastern, al-Sharqi, mound is significantly smaller.

Until the 20th century, the hills obstructed the way to the Zarqa heading east. Ancient hikers had to dodge their way into the valley and head to the Wadi Hajjaj, the shortest way to the settlement area of the Ammonites. That is the reason why the Tulul al-Dhahab had, until the construction of the Roman road at the exit of Zarqa in the Jordan Valley near the present village of Abū al-Zīghān, a high strategic importance. 6.5 kilometres (4.0 mi) west of the Tulul al-Dhahab is the large tell of Deir Alla, dating to the Bronze and Iron Age, commonly identified with the biblical city of Sukkot.

== Identification ==
Tulul adh-Dahab is identified with several place names mentioned in ancient sources.

Until 1970, biblical scholars identified the whole site (or one or other of the twin peaks) with the biblical city of Penuel. Penuel is mentioned in the Book of Genesis as the site of Jacob's struggle with the angel (Genesis 32:22–32). In 1 Kings, it is mentioned as a capital for Jeroboam, which he fortified (1 Kings 12:25). Based on the Genesis account, scholars believed Penuel to be the location of a sacred sanctuary, and presumed that there must have been a temple from Iron Age I or earlier on one of the peaks.

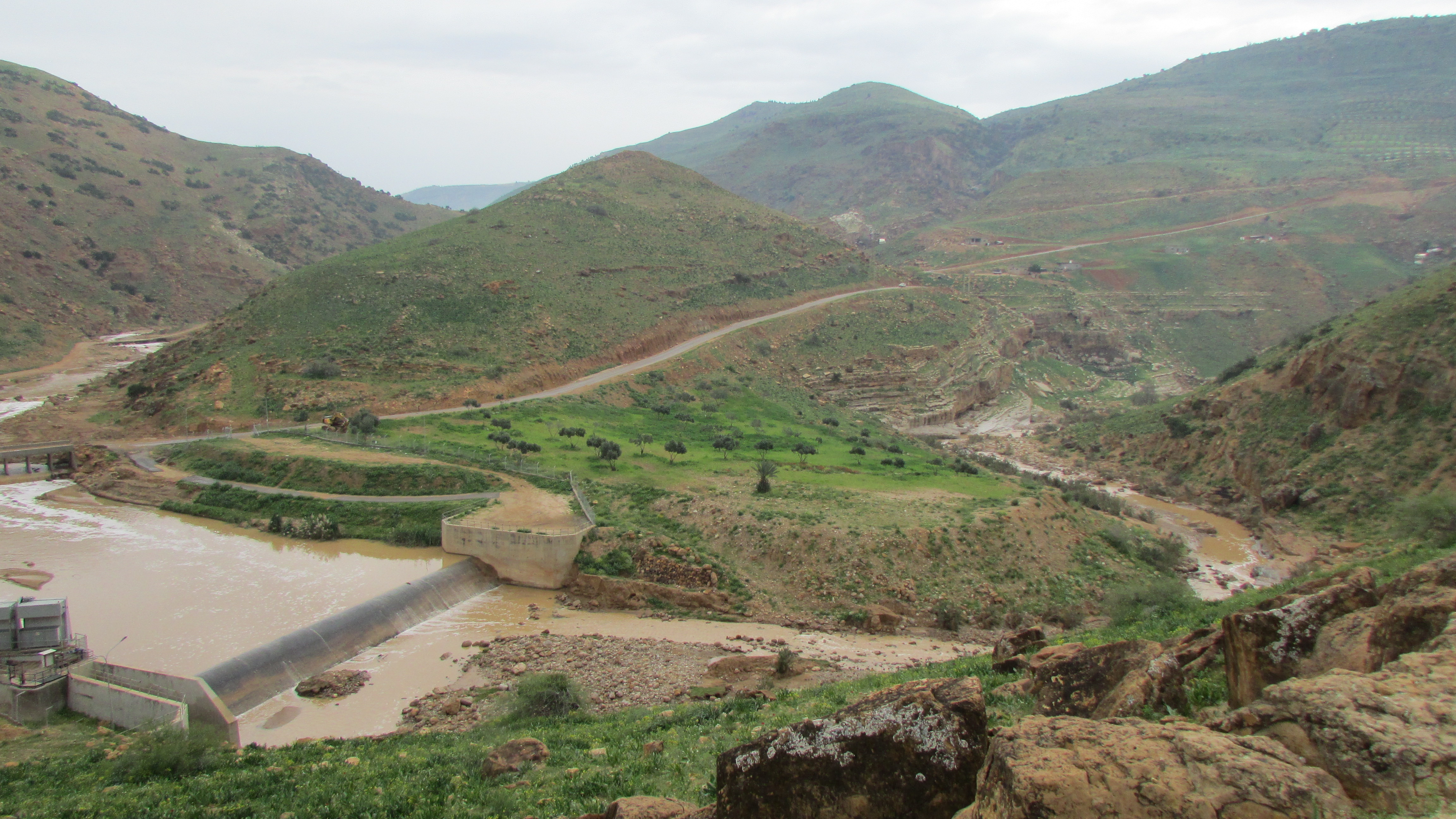
Zarqa River, biblical River Jabbok, near the eastern mound

After 1970, most biblical scholars started identifying the two peaks with the biblical city of Mahanaim. Mahanaim is first mentioned as the place where Jacob had a vision of angels (Genesis 32:2). Believing it to be "God's camp", Jacob names the place Mahanaim (Hebrew: מחניים, lit. "two camps"). During the days of the United Kingdom of Israel, Mahanaim was a stronghold that had been adapted to serve as a sanctuary for important fugitives. After King Saul's death, Mahanaim is the place where his son Ish-bosheth was crowned as king of Israel. Mahanaim is also the location to which King David is described as fleeing while at war with his son Absalom. Some scholars took the dual form of the name literally and associated it with the twin peaks. These scholars also looked for an alternative location for Penuel. According to Genesis 32:22, a ford across the lower River Jabbok was located close to Penuel. As a result, the site had to be located next to the Zarqa River and was therefore identified as Tall al-Hamma East (32°11'32.0"N 35°38'48.0"E). However, not all of the scholars agree with the interpretation of Mahanaim as a quantitative dual form.

The contemporary Israeli archaeologist Israel Finkelstein sees the two hills as two distinct sites that probably featured distinct names during antiquity. He suggested identifying the western (larger) hill with Mahanaim and the eastern one with Penuel.

Scholars of the Hellenistic period proposed to identify the site with the Seleucid cities of Amathous and Essa mentioned in the writings of Flavius Josephus. However, according to the excavators, the hypothesis that Amathous was located on the western hill is not very likely owing to chronological discrepancies.

== Discovery and excavations ==
The research of the late 19th and 20th century was confirmed by the descriptions of the Tulul adh-Dhahab by S. Merrill (1878, 1881), G. Gustav Dalman, C. Steuernagel and others. M. North conducted a topographic surveys by 1955. But it was the American archaeologists Robert L. Gordon and Linda E. Villiers who carried out a major survey in the years of 1980 and 1982. They published the first map of the ruins that were still visible at that time.

Since 2005, annual excavations are conducted in the western hill by a team from the University of Dortmund, under the direction of Prof. Dr. Thomas Pola, in collaboration with the Jordanian Department of Antiquities. Since 2006 a team of the University of Basel have joined the excavations. They are engaged in the geomagnetic prospection, the tachymetric 3D surveying and the production of close-range aerial photographs for photogrammetric purposes of the site. In addition to the work of R. L. Gordon in 1980/82, there is now for the first time a detailed map of the entire excavation site available in which all the visible surface artifacts are measured.

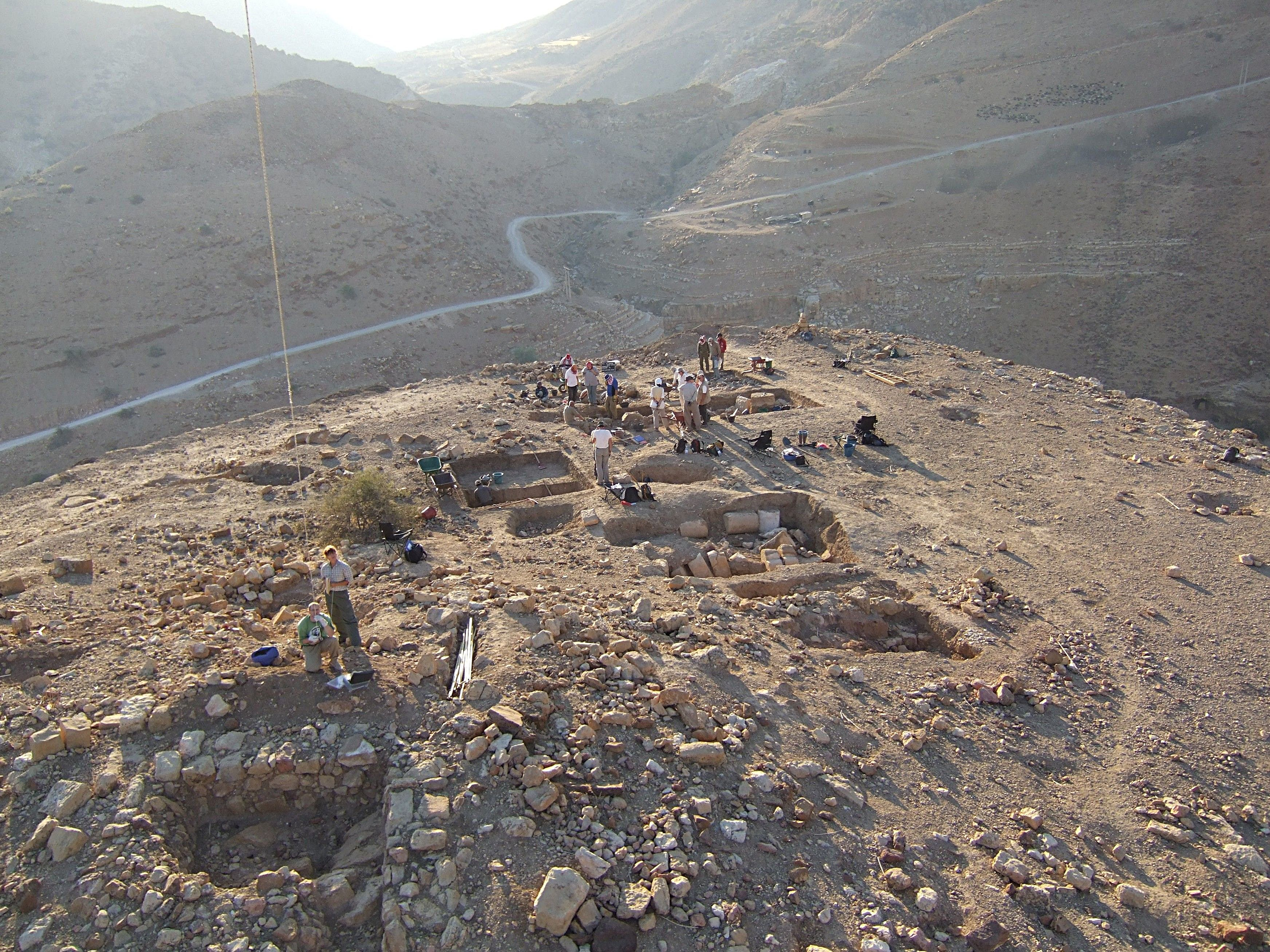
The 2008 excavation campaign at dawn.

== Archaeological findings ==
On the two highest terraces of the hill so far three settlement phases were detected archaeologically:

According to radiocarbon dating, the earliest settlement dates from the period 1300-970 BC (Late Bronze Age to Iron Age I); previously no associated architectural remains were found, but layers and a wide variety of finds. At least one predecessor of the fortified wall that surrounds Terrace I and II is contemporary to this earliest phase. The carved lime rock ashlars that were embedded in the later architecture (II-III) as building material could originate from a cult or representative building of this earliest phase or a little later from the period 900-700 BCE. The three largest and most interpretable fragments that were found so far show the head of a decorated lion, a woman or child with a goat, and a stylistically similar illustration of two beardless persons, each are holding an instrument in front of them that surmount their heads considerably, maybe a harp. According to the excavators, the iconography of these items suggests they were used for a cultic activity. This implies the possibility that there was a sanctuary on the top of the western hill during Iron Age II.

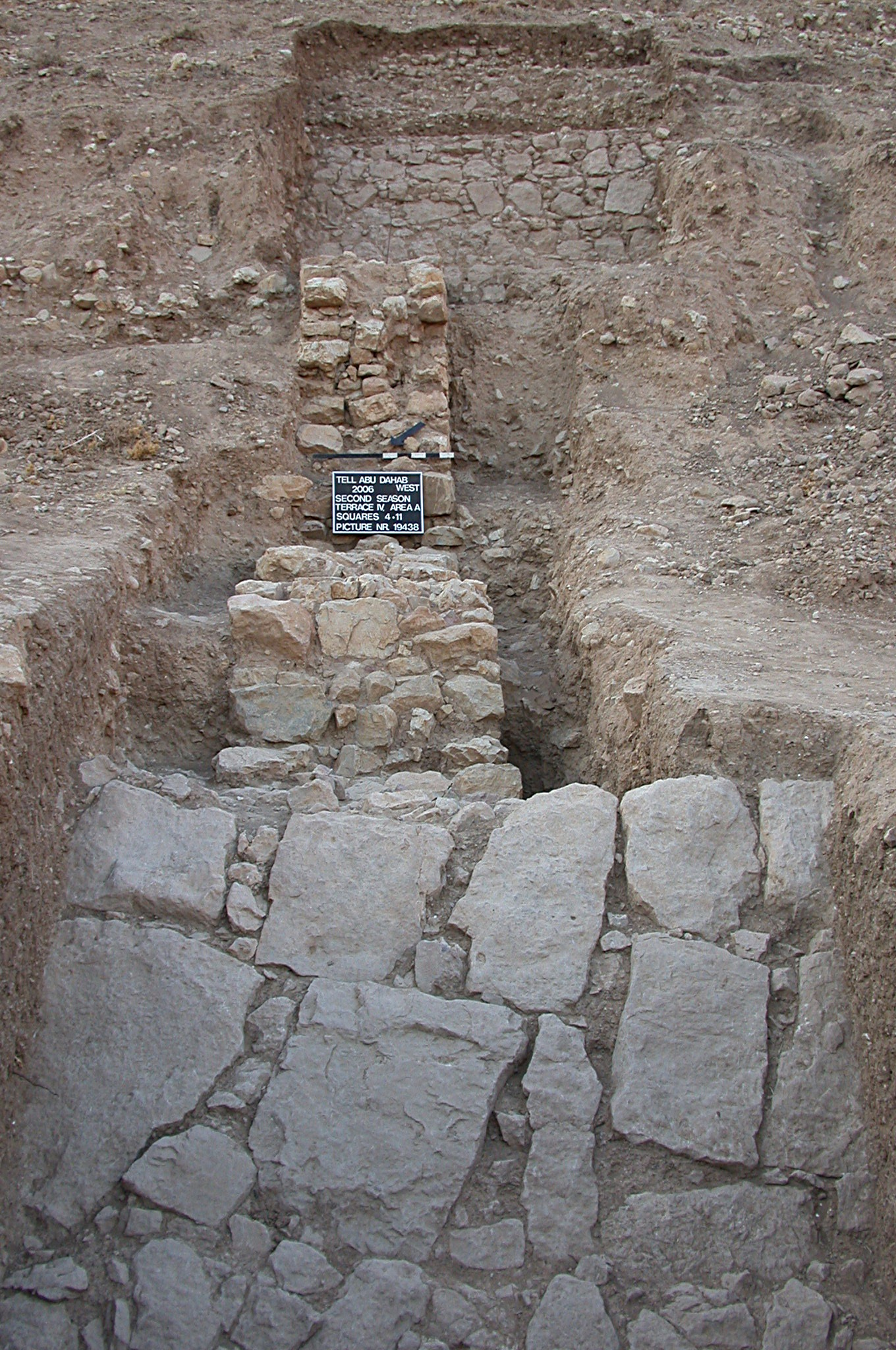
The ramparts at the western tell.

Few sections on the top terrace showed foundations of buildings built between 375 and 175 BCE (Achaemenid and Hellenistic periods). Most of these features were destroyed during the construction of the youngest phase. Additionally, some isolated charcoal fragments from the uppermost terrace have been dated using radiocarbon dating to 1960–1750 v. Chr.

On the highest plateau, a palace of approximately 30x30 meters was built with two adjacent peristyle courts, each about 15x15 meters in size and angled eastwards. The fragments of architecture of this palace are stylistically placed in the late Hellenistic period or during the early years of Herod the Great (73-4 BCE), coins and 14C data corroborate this time approach. Detailed findings suggest that some of this architecture were two-story buildings. Besides limestone, mud bricks were used too as building material. This palace ended with a fire event probably after about 50-25 BC, then the facility was vacated and abandoned. Later most of the still standing architecture collapsed in an earthquake. The top two terraces on the steep eastern and south slope were surrounded by a today about 0.5 - 1.5m high preserved wall, its original height is not known. At its inner line room like foundations are set. The layer and period relationship of these walls with the two successive palaces (II and III) could not be clarified yet.

Furthermore, a Chalcolithic settlement lies at the southeastern foot of the western mound, Tell edh-Dhahab el-Gharbi, only slightly above the Jabbok River, but safely above the flood line.

== Bibliography ==
- Boris Dreyer: Tulul adh-Dhahab (Wadi az-Zarqa) lead sling bullets from Terrace I. In: Annual of the Department of Antiquities of Jordan 57, 2013 (2016), ISSN 0449-1564, S. 97–104.
- Martin Noth: The German Protestant Institute of Science Antiquity of the Holy Land. Lehrkursus the 1955th. In: Journal of the German Palestine Society. Vol. 72, 1956, ISSN 0012-1169, p. 31-82, here: 52–58.
- Robert L. Gordon, Linda E. Villiers: Telul edh Dhahab and its environs surveys of 1980 and 1982: a preliminary report. In: Annual of the Department of Antiquities of Jordan. Vol. 27, 1983, p. 275-289.
- Robert L. Gordon: Telul edh Dhahab Survey (Jordan) 1980 and 1982. In: Mitteilungen der Deutschen Orient-Gesellschaft zu Berlin. Vol. 116, 1984, p. 131-137.
- Thomas Pola, Mohammad al-Balawnah, Wolfgang Thiel, Emmanuel Rehfeld, Tobias Krause: Fragments of Carved Stones from Tulul adh-Dhahab in the Lower Wadi az-Zarqā. In: Journal of Epigraphy & Rock Drawings. Bd. 3, 2009, S. 17–24.
- Thomas Pola, Ritzzeichnungen. Werfen archäologische Funde aus dem Ostjordanland Licht auf Ez 8,10 und 1Kön 6,29-36? In: Theologische Beiträge. Vol. 41, 2010, p. 97-113.
- Thomas Pola, Hannelore Kröger, Bernd Rasink, Jochen Reinhard, Mohammad al-Balawnah, Mohammad Abu Abila: A preliminary report of the Tulul adh-Dhahab (Wadi az-Zarqa) survey and excavation seasons 2005 - 2011. In: Annual of the Department of Antiquities of Jordan 57, 2013 (2016), ISSN 0449-1564, S. 81–96 (Link).
- Jochen Reinhard: Things on strings and complex computer algorithms. Kite Aerial Photography and Structure from Motion Photogrammetry at the Tulul adh-Dhahab, Jordan. In: AARGnews 45, 2012, ISSN 1756-753X, S. 37–41 (Link or Link).
