= Zarqa River =

Jordanian river near Amman, tributary of the lower Jordan River

Coordinates: 32°11′30″N 35°48′06″E

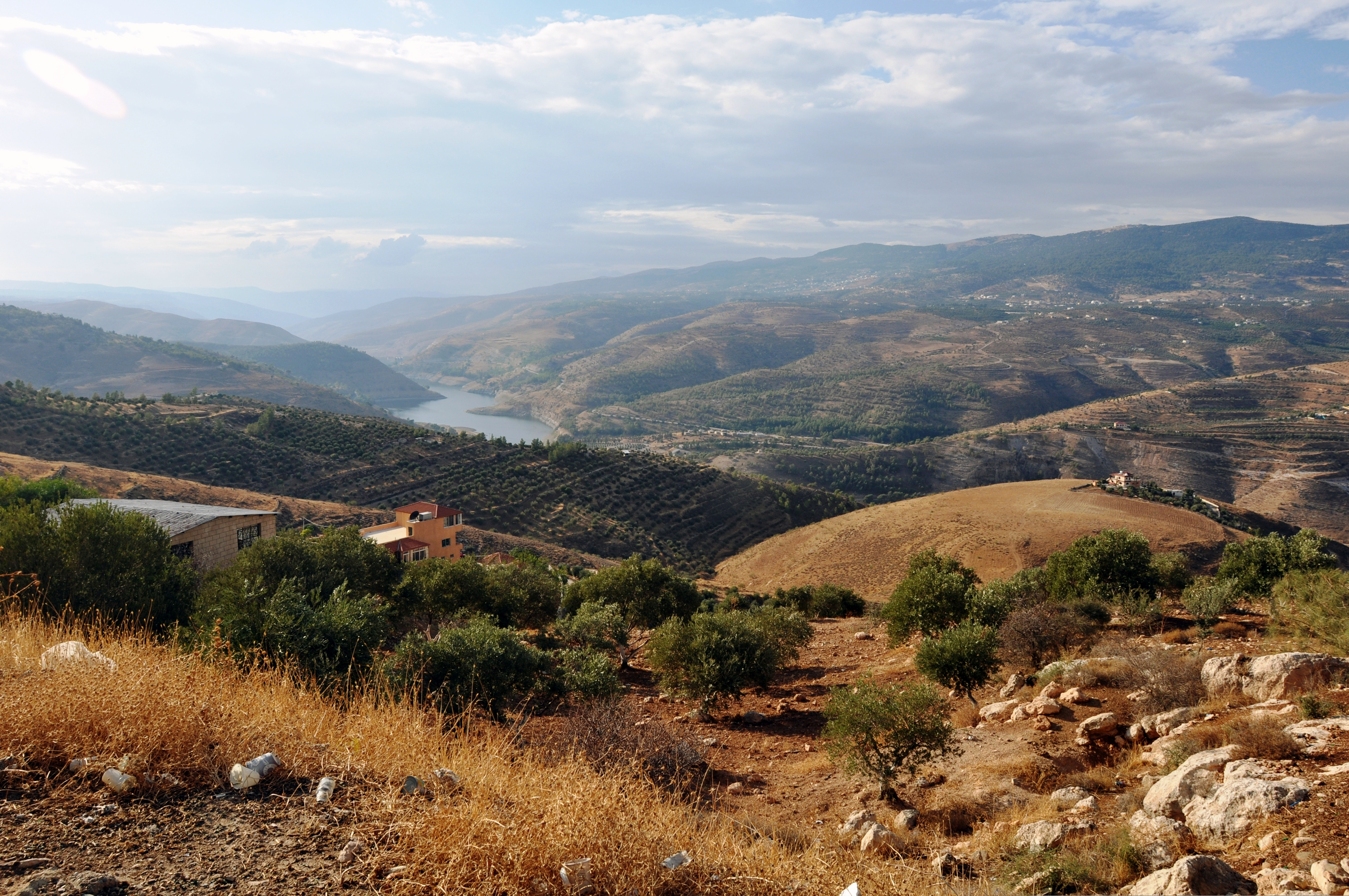
- Zarqa River
- Etymology: Arabic زرقاء, "the blue river"
- Native name: نهر الزرقاء

Location
- Country: Jordan
- Governorate: Zarqa Governorate, Jerash Governorate, Balqa Governorate
- Cities: Amman, Zarqa, Jerash

Physical characteristics
- Source: 'Ain Ghazal
  - location: Amman
  - elevation: 776 m (2,546 ft)
- Mouth: Jordan River
  - elevation: −313 m (−1,027 ft)
- Length: 65 km (40 mi)
- Basin size: 3,900 km^{2} (1,500 sq mi)
- Discharge
  - location: Jordan River
  - minimum: 2 m^{3}/s (71 cu ft/s)
  - maximum: 8 m^{3}/s (280 cu ft/s)

Basin features
- Tributaries
  - left: Wadi Dhuleil

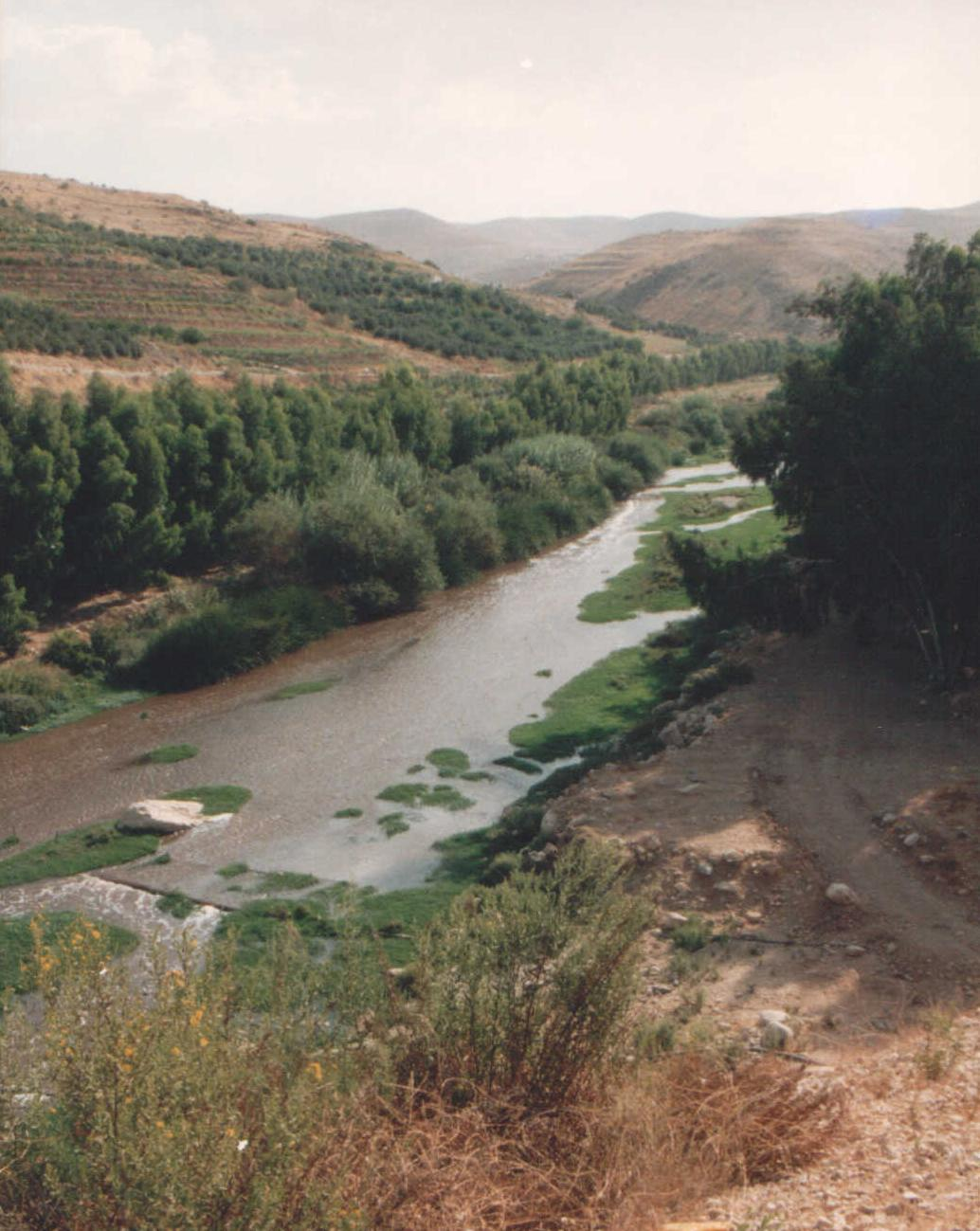
Zarqa River

The Zarqa River (Arabic: نهر الزرقاء, Nahr az-Zarqāʾ, lit. "the River of the Blue [City]") is the second largest tributary of the lower Jordan River, after the Yarmouk River. It is the third largest river in the region by annual discharge and its watershed encompasses the most densely populated areas east of the Jordan River. The Zarqa rises in springs near Amman, and flows through a deep and broad valley into the Jordan, at an elevation 1,090 metres (3,580 ft) lower.

At its spring lays 'Ain Ghazal (Arabic: عين غزال), a major archaeological site that dates back to the Neolithic. Archaeological finds along the course of the river indicate the area was rich in flora and fauna in the past.

The river is heavily polluted and its restoration is one of the top priorities for the Jordanian Ministry of the Environment.

Geologically, the Zarqa River is about 30 million years old. It is well known for its amber deposits that date back to the Hauterivian era of the Early Cretaceous, 135 million years ago. A remarkable flora and fauna was reported from this amber reflecting tropical paleoenvironmental conditions prevailing during the time of resin deposition.

== Name ==
The Arabic name, Nahr az-Zarqa' (نهر الزرقاء) means "the blue river", where nahr means river and zarqa' (زرقاء) means blue.

== Biblical Jabbok ==
The Zarqa River is identified with the biblical river Jabbok. Biblical Jacob crossed the Jabbok on his way to Canaan, after leaving Harran. It leads west into the Sukkot Valley, from where one crosses over the Jordan and can easily reach Shechem, as Jacob eventually did. The biblical cities of Zaretan and Adam are also at the mouth of the valley.

The river is first mentioned in the Book of Genesis in connection with the meeting of Jacob and Esau, and with the struggle of Jacob with the angel. It was the boundary separating the territory of Reuben and Gad from that of Ammon, the latter being described as lying along the Jabbok. The territory of Sihon is described as extending "from Arnon unto Jabbok" (Numbers 21:24), and it was reclaimed later by the King of Ammon. Eusebius places the river between Gerasa and Philadelphia.

Bible scholars have noticed a something of a contradiction in the Hebrew Bible regarding the ownership of the area between the Arnon and Jabbok rivers. According to Numbers, that area originally belonged to the Moabites and was later conquered by Sihon, king of the Amorites, before the Israelites took it (Numbers 21:13–26). However, Judges presents this land as initially Ammonite territory, which the Israelites took from Sihon.(Judges 11:18).

== Geography and hydrography ==
=== Course ===
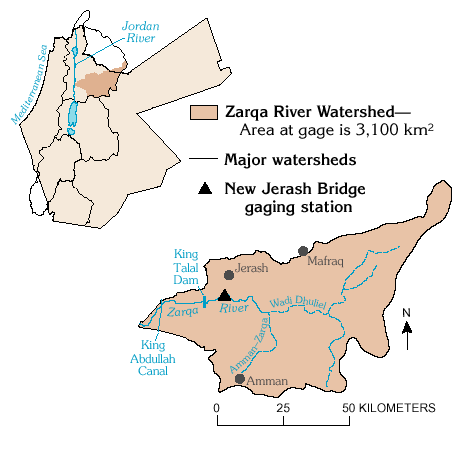
Zarqa River watershed (Executive Action Team (EXACT), Multilateral Working Group on Water Resources)

The headwaters of the Zarqa begin just northeast of Amman, rising from a spring named Ain Ghazal ("Gazelle spring"). The river flows to the north before heading west. Rising on the eastern side of the mountains of Gilead, it runs a course of about 105 kilometers (65 mi) in a wild and deep ravine before flowing into the Jordan River between the Sea of Galilee and the Dead Sea, at a point 1,090 meters (3,576 ft) below its origin. At its higher reaches, the river banks are mostly steep and canyon-like. Near Ain Ghazal, two tributary wadis join the river, and it opens up into a shallow basin. It forms the border between the Jordanian administrative regions of Irbid and Balqa Governorate.

=== Water flow, catchment area, use ===
The river is perennial, but with a very low base flow of about 2 million to 3 million cubic meters per month during the summer months, and as much as 5–million to 8 million cubic meters per month during the rainy winter months. This makes it the second largest tributary of the lower Jordan River, after the Yarmouk River, and the third largest river in the region by annual discharge. Irregular floods after rain storms may increase the flow to as much as 54 million cubic meters. The median annual flow is 63.3 million cubic meters.

The total basin area is 3,900 km^{2} (1,500 sq mi) the largest in Jordan. A small dam, Al-Rwyha dam, near the village of Dayr Alla, marks the end of the upstream portion of the river, where it is natural and fast-flowing with very clear water. There is very little agriculture along the banks of the river in this region, which are very rocky. Downstream from this dam, the water level is very low, and the river banks are intensively used for agriculture, as well as grazing by sheep and goats

The King Talal Dam was built across the lower Zarqa in 1970, and created a reservoir with a capacity of 55 million cubic meters, and increased in 1987 to 86 million cubic meters. When built, it was expected that the reservoir would supply water for municipal use in the Amman region. However, the current levels of pollution in the lake make the water unfit for human consumption, and it is used for irrigation only.

=== Bridges ===
The new Jerash Bridge crosses the Zarqa upstream of King Talal reservoir, on the road from Amman to Jerash. The bridge is the site of a gauging station where flow measurements are continuously taken.

In the city of Zarqa, several bridges, vehicular and pedestrian, cross the river. The earliest of these was built by the Chechen founders of the city. Current bridges include the Zawahreh Bridge, a vehicular bridge connecting Baha' al-Din Street with al-Zuhur Street and another connecting Baha' al-Din Street with King Talal Street. Two pedestrian bridges connect al-Zuhur Street and Baha' al-Din Street, and Wasfi al-Tal Street and Petra Street.

== Natural history ==
The geological origins of the Zarqa river are about 30 million years old, when the Jordan Rift Valley was formed. A ripple effect of its formation was the creation of side-wadis. The Zarqa river carved into the western edge of one of these side wadis. The earliest exposed formations in the area date from the Triassic and early Jurassic periods, and have been named Zerqa and Kurnub formations. The rock formations are marine sediments, remnants of the prehistoric Tethys Sea, which used to cover the area running roughly east–west, halfway across the present Dead Sea. Along the Zarqa, crystalline limestone alternating with shale was found. The next layer is a 20-30 meter high layer of gypsum, argillaceous marly lime, shales and iron-rich stone and sandstone. This layer is rich in fossils.

=== Flora ===
Archaeological finds of charcoaled remains indicate that poplar and tamarix used to grow along the banks of the Zarqa, with forests of wild oak growing on the hillsides. Today, tamarix thickets are still widespread in the floodplains, and the banks are cultivated with fruit orchards and vegetable fields. Along the course of Zarqa River, water is pumped directly and used to irrigate crops of leafy vegetables such as parsley, spinach, cabbage, cauliflower and lettuce, as well as potatoes. Olive trees are also found along the river's banks. Tulips grow on many hillsides of the river, while in the springs area and the watercourse, water vegetation is found. Natural pine forests grow in the King Talal Dam area. Along the upstream banks, where the river runs wild, one finds the common reed, oleander and Typha species.

Since the waters of the Zarqa are highly contaminated, with high levels of organic matter and various chemical compounds (especially detergents and dyes), the use of Zarqa water for irrigation has significantly altered the biodiversity of the natural flora, and caused the disappearance of the majority of fresh water species.

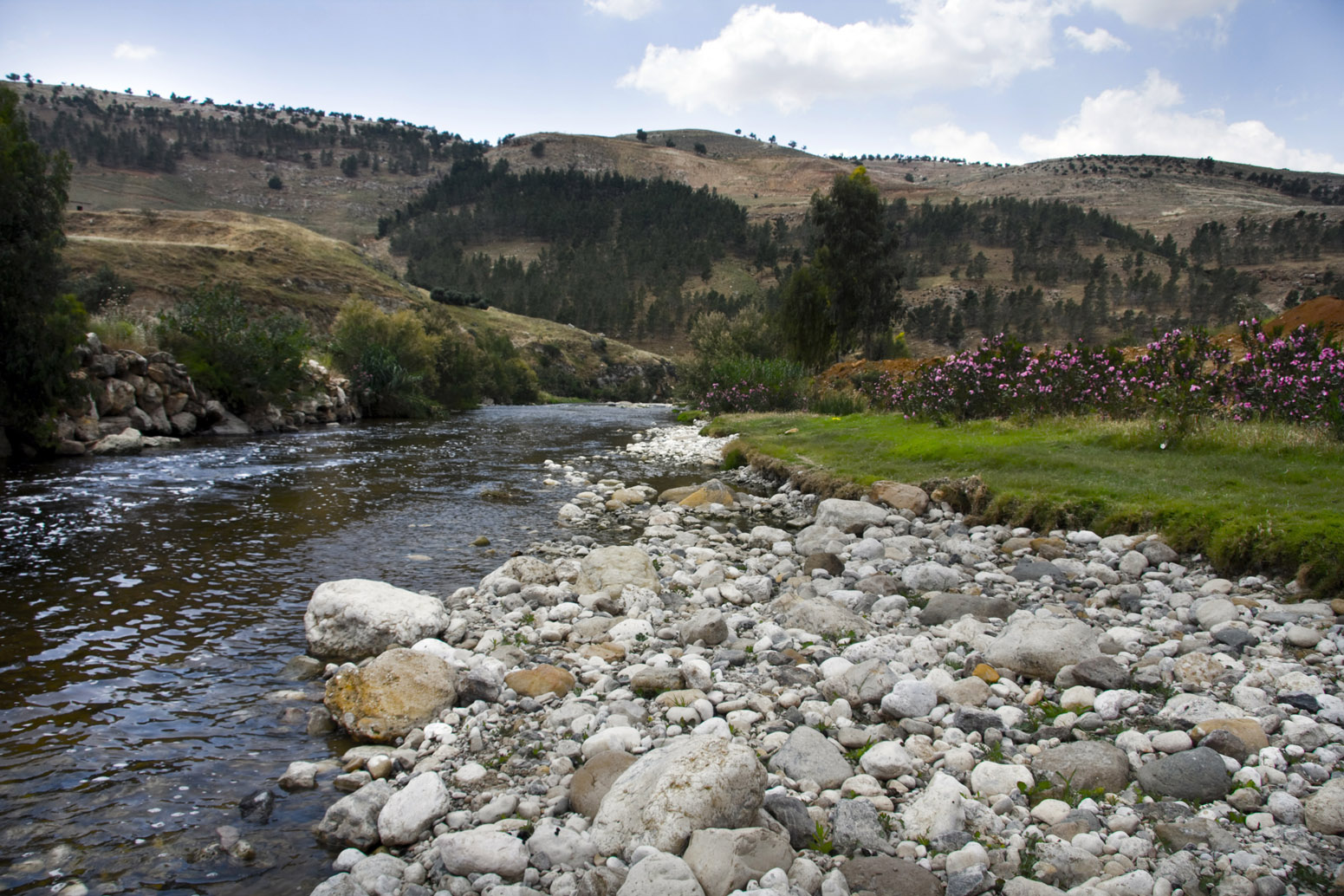
Zarqa River near Mastaba

=== Fauna ===
In prehistoric times, the area was rich with fauna, and 45 distinct animal species have been identified, half of them wild animals. Domesticated goats were the most common, and gazelles were the most frequently occurring wild animal species.
Today, the area is still home to a diverse population of birds and mammals, and some of the breeding species found do not breed anywhere else in Jordan. Among the bird species found are the European roller, desert lark, Dead Sea sparrow, desert finch and blue-cheeked bee-eater. The King Talal dam has created a lake which is a habitat for migratory waterfowl and various fish species. Notable birds found in the lake area include the little bittern, cattle egrets, grey herons, white storks, common teal and Eurasian coot. The lake's waters sustain fish, some of which are indigenous species and some are introduced species. The most common are tilapia. Migratory birds also winter in the man-made pools which make up the Kherbit Al-Samra Sewage Treatment Plant, located in a broad depression close to Wadi Dhulayl, the main tributary of the Zarqa River. As many as 6,000 white storks have been spotted roosting there. Mammals found in the area include the common otter (Lutra lutra), and the Persian squirrel (Sciurus anomalus). The otter is considered a threatened species.

== History ==
The Zarqa valley was an important passageway connecting the Eastern Desert with the Jordan Valley.

=== Prehistory ===
'Ain Ghazal, the origin of the spring the feeds the Zarqa river, is a major archaeological site, dating back to the Neolithic period. It was continuously occupied for more than two thousand years, and the earliest finds date to 7200 BCE. 'Ain Ghazal is one of the earliest known human settlements with evidence of domesticated animals. With a population of around 3,000 at its height, it was also one of the largest prehistoric population centers in the Near East, with about five time the population of neighboring Jericho.

=== Iron Age ===
During a 1982 survey of the Zarqa Valley, a number of Early Iron Age sites were discovered, concentrated along the banks of the Zerqa and its tributaries. One of them, Tulul adh-Dhahab, is under further research now. It features two neighboring tells which are commonly identified with the ancient Israelite cities of Mahanaim and Penuel, mentioned in the Hebrew Bible.

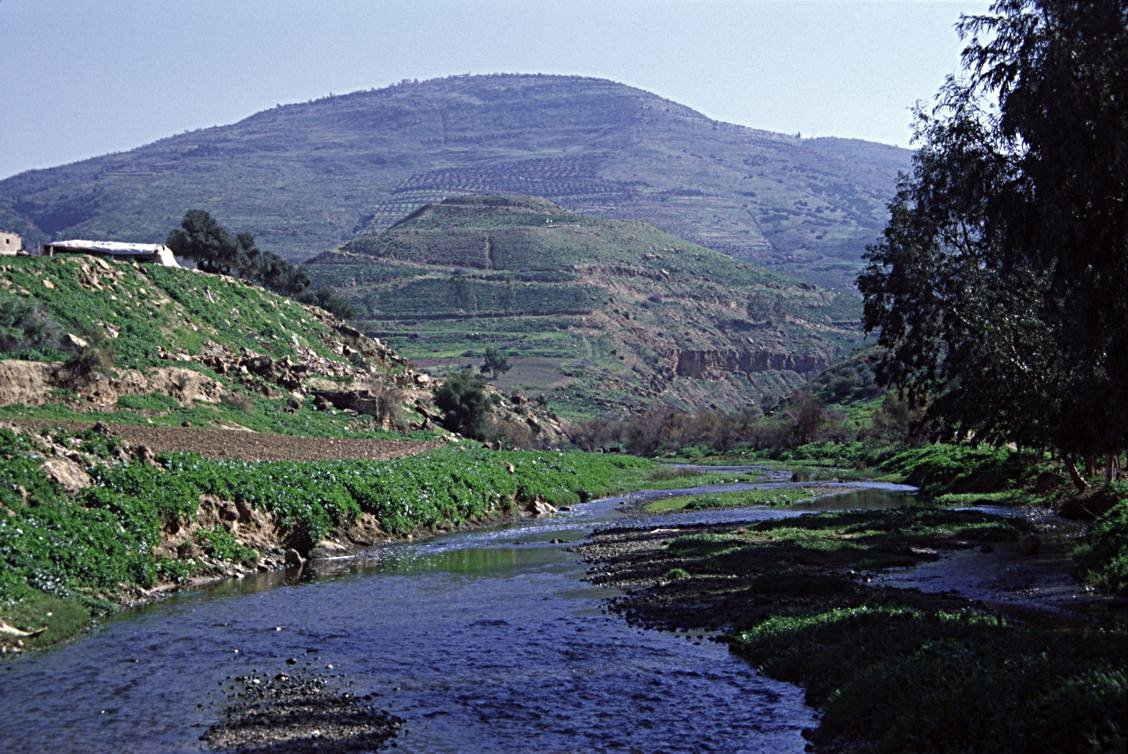
Zarqa River running near Tulul adh-Dhahab

=== Hellenistic Jerash ===
Wadi Jarash, a northern tributary of the Zarqa River, flows through the modern city of Jerash. Inhabited since the Bronze Age, Jerash became an important center during the Hellenistic and Roman periods, when it was known as Gerasa, home to noted mathematician Nicomachus. The ruins of the city are well preserved and have been extensively excavated.

=== Modern town of Zarqa ===
Zarqa, Jordan's second largest city, is built on the banks of the Zarqa River, and is the largest settlement along its course. The town of Zarqa was founded in 1902 by Chechen immigrants. Its population grew rapidly with an influx of Palestinian refugees who fled the West Bank during the Six-Day War.

== Environmental concerns ==
The Zarqa river is highly polluted. In many areas, raw sewage flows untreated directly into the river through dry riverbeds (wadis), contaminating it and creating a stench which has been a cause of numerous complaints, particularly during the summer months. Though sewage treatment stations have been built in a couple of locations (including Ain Ghazal and Khirbet As Samra), these stations often receive more water than they can handle. Such overflow occurs during winter floods, as well as during summer months when the population increases with the return of migrant workers to Amman. During overflow, untreated water runs directly to the Zarqa river. As a result, the Zarqa's water is brownish colored, often with dense foam due to large amounts of organic matter. Other sources of pollutants are the illegal dumping of industrial waste, including those from textile factories, and batteries and oils from garages.

The river's watershed encompasses the most densely populated areas east of the Jordan River, and it flows through an industrialized area that is home to more than 52% of Jordan's industrial plants, including the Jordan Petroleum Refinery Company. During the summer months, treated domestic and industrial waste-water compose nearly all of the flow, and substantially degrade the water quality. Coupled with over-extraction of water from the underground aquifer and the naturally low base flow of the Zarqa, this has created a major problem, described as one of Jordan's "environmental black spots". and has made rehabilitation of the Zarqa a top priority for the Jordanian Ministry of the Environment. The restoration project is estimated to cost $30 million.

== See also ==
- Arnon River
- Yarmouk River
- List of most-polluted rivers
- Seil Amman

== Sources ==
- Room, Adrian (2005). Placenames Of The World: Origins and Meanings of the Names for 6,600 Countries, Cities, Territories, Natural Features and Historic Sites (2nd ed.). McFarland & Company. ISBN 0-7864-2248-3.
- Coogan, Michael David (March 2001). The Oxford History of the Biblical World. Oxford University Press. ISBN 0-19-513937-2.
- Larsow, Ferdinand (1862). Onomasticon. Berlin.
- Held, Colbert C. (November 1, 2000). Middle East Patterns: Places, Peoples, and Politics (3rd ed.). Westview Press. ISBN 0-8133-3488-8.
- Jaimoukha, Amjad (2005-01-13). The Chechens: A Handbook. Routledge. ISBN 0-415-32328-2.
