= Come, O thou Traveller unknown =

18th-century Christian hymn by Charles Wesley

Wrestling Jacob
- Methodist Hymn
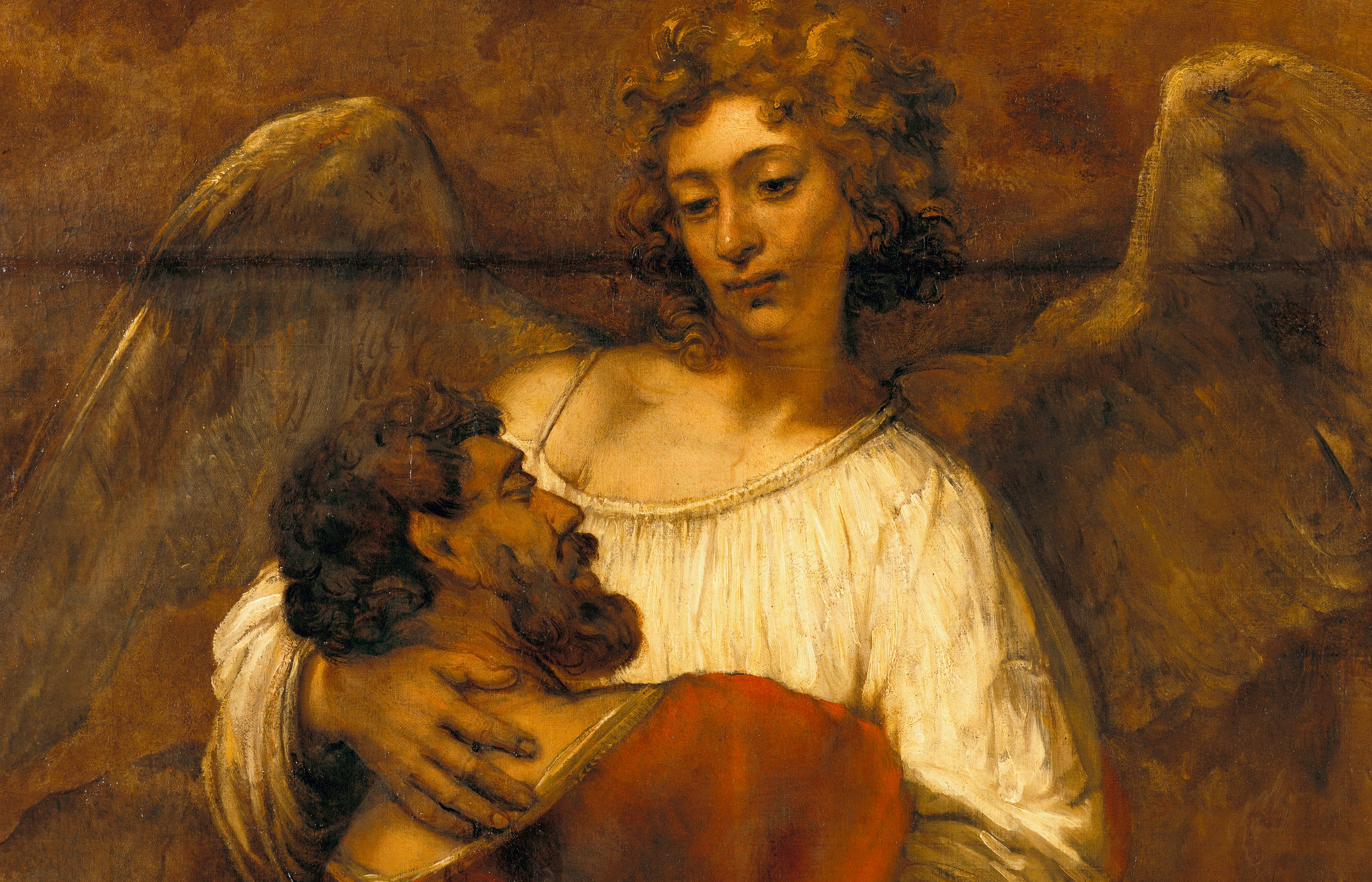
- Jacob wrestling with the Angel
- Other name: "Come, O thou Traveller unknown"
- Text: Charles Wesley
- Based on: Genesis 32:24–32
- Meter: 8.8.8.8.8.8
- Melody: "Wrestling Jacob" (Samuel Sebastian Wesley), "Vernon" (Lucius Chapin) "Candler" (Traditional Scottish), "David's Harp" (Robert King), "Woodbury" (Erik Routley)
- Published: 1742

"Wrestling Jacob", also known by its incipit, "Come, O thou Traveller unknown", is a Christian hymn written by Methodist hymn writer Charles Wesley. It is based on the biblical account of Jacob wrestling with an angel, from Genesis 32:24-32, with Wesley interpreting this as an analogy for Christian conversion. First published in 1742, it has been included in every Methodist hymnbook since 1780. In its original form, it had fourteen stanzas, but it is rarely sung in its entirety. The hymn is commonly described as one of Charles Wesley's greatest compositions, with the hymn writer Isaac Watts quoted as saying that "that single poem, Wrestling Jacob, was worth all the verses he himself had written".

== History ==
"Come, O thou Traveller unknown" was first published in Charles Wesley's 1742 collection Hymns and Sacred Poems, under the title "Wrestling Jacob". It was later included in his brother John's foundational Methodist hymnal Collection of Hymns for the use of the People called Methodist, published in 1780. The words have been described as a "spiritual autobiography", reflecting Wesley's conversion in 1738. Hymnologist J. Ernest Rattenbury commented: "Every detail in 'Wrestling Jacob' is as if it were an event of his own experience." It is one of three hymns of an autobiographical nature that Wesley wrote in the years following his conversion, alongside "And Can It Be" and "Where Shall My Wondering Soul Begin?". In John Wesley's 1780 collection, it was included in the section "For Mourners Brought to the Birth", referring to the new birth of Christian conversion.

In its original form, the hymn consists of fourteen stanzas, each with six lines. In the 1780 Collection of Hymns, the fifth and seventh stanzas were removed, and the text was also divided into two parts, with the second given the heading "Yield to me now, for I am weak." The 1849 hymnbook Hymns for the use of the Methodist Episcopal Church divides the text into four parts, each given a separate hymn number: "Come, O Thou Traveller unknown", "Wilt Thou not yet to me reveal", "Yield to me now, for I am weak", and "The Sun of Righteousness on me". It has been included in every Methodist hymn book since 1780.

It is uncommon for the hymn to be sung in its entirety, and in many hymnals, it is abbreviated to only include four stanzas. Hymns Ancient and Modern (1904) has 5 stanzas, The English Hymnal (1906) has 4, and The United Methodist Hymnal (1989), includes a 4-stanza version alongside the 12-stanza text. In light of its length, some have argued that the text should be treated as a poem rather than a congregational hymn. The editor of A Dictionary of Hymnology, John Julian, considered the hymn "unsuited to Public Worship". Erik Routley considered the full version "hardly singable", though in an abbreviated form, he described it as "an utterance of perfect clarity".

== Text ==
The hymn is written in Long Particular Metre (88.88.88), which was commonly used by Wesley, appearing in over 1000 pieces written by him. It has an ABABCC rhyming pattern.

The words offer a Christian interpretation of the account of Jacob wrestling with an angel, from Genesis 32:24-32. Based on his Journal, Wesley is known to have preached on this biblical narrative on at least eight occasions. As with some of his other hymns, Wesley was influenced by Matthew Henry's commentary on this passage, first published in 1706. For example, Henry draws a connection with the Apostle Paul's comments in 2 Corinthians 12:10, "When I am weak, then I am strong". This is echoed in Wesley's lyrics.

In Wesley's interpretation, the Genesis account is treated as a "typology of Christian experience". In the hymn, he "takes the experience of Jacob wrestling with the angel and presents it as the story of the agony and joy of every truly repentant and eventually justified sinner." The text involves a struggle to discover the identity of the unknown "Traveller", with the reader or singer asking the question: "Who, I ask Thee, who art Thou?" Eventually the moment of realisation comes with the line: "'Tis Love! 'tis Love! Thou diedst for me!" In these words, and in the following stanzas, the Traveller is identified as Jesus. For the remainder of the hymn, each stanza ends with the line: "Thy nature and Thy Name is Love". The final stanzas are a "celebration of the great mystery of redeeming love".

== Tune ==
The hymn has been set to several tunes, with hymnals often including multiple tunes. Hymnologist J. R. Watson has suggested this is an indication that "it is hard to find a tune which will carry such dramatic words".

One of the most common tunes is "Wrestling Jacob", which was written by Wesley's grandson Samuel Sebastian Wesley. This first appeared in The European Psalmist in 1872.

Another common tune is "Vernon", which first published as a hymn tune in 1813, attributed to Lucius Chapin, and paired with the Isaac Watts text "Lord, what a heav'n of saving grace". It was first used as the tune for "Come, O Thou Traveller Unknown" in 1818, in Samuel Metcalf's Kentucky Harmonist. Its close association with the hymn sometimes led to the tune being printed under the name Traveller or Wrestling Jacob.

The hymn has also been sung to "Candler". This is a traditional Scottish tune also known as "Ye banks and braes", after a Robert Burns poem that was set to this music. This tune was first paired with Wesley's words in the 1935 Methodist Hymnal, where it was renamed "Candler" in honour of Bishop Warren Candler, who suggested the use of this tune. In the 1966 edition of the hymnal, a new arrangement of the tune was provided by Carlton Young.

In some hymnbooks, the tune used is "David's Harp" (by Robert King). This was first used to accompany a setting of Psalm 101 in Henry Playford's 1701 book The Divine Companion. It was first used for Wesley's hymn in the 1906 English Hymnal, and is also used in Songs of Praise (1925) and the 1933 Methodist Hymn Book.

In 1969, while at the Fellowship of Methodist Musicians conference, Erik Routley composed a new tune for this hymn, entitled "Woodbury". This was his second attempt to write a tune for the hymn; he had made a previous unsuccessful attempt in the 1930s. This tune appears in the 1982 hymnal of the American Episcopal Church, among others.

== Legacy ==
This hymn is commonly described as one of Charles Wesley's greatest compositions. In his eulogy to his brother at the 1788 Methodist Conference, John Wesley quoted a high commendation of the hymn from Isaac Watts, who is recognised as the "father of English hymnody". In Wesley's words, "Dr Watts did not scruple to say, that 'that single poem, Wrestling Jacob, was worth all the verses he himself had written'". James Montgomery, in his book The Christian Psalmist (1825) described it as "among Charles Wesley's highest achievements... in which with consummate art he carries on the action of a lyrical drama". In 1876, Dean Stanley read the words of this hymn at the dedication of a memorial to Charles and John Wesley in Westminster Abbey.

Modern commentators have also praised Wesley's composition. Hymnologist Carl F. Price described it as "Charles Wesley's greatest lyric poem". Erik Routley commented: "I believe that here you have a hymn whose deep mysterious language will unerringly lead the singer toward a depth of faith which no other hymn can quite achieve for him." Timothy Dudley-Smith wrote: "The whole poem is a sustained tour de force in which the spontaneous daring, dramatic emotion and vitality are enhanced by an unobtrusive skill and an astonishing maturity of technique."
