= Zaretan =

City mentioned in the Hebrew Bible

Coordinates: 32.0958°N 35.4614°E

Zaretan or Zarethan (Hebrew: צָרְתָן), also known as Zeredathah, is a city mentioned in the Hebrew Bible as near the location where the Hebrews crossed the Jordan (Joshua 3:16). In the books of Joshua (3:16, KJV "Zaretan") and 1 Kings (4:12 KJV "Zartanah", 7:46 "Zarthan"), it is called Zarethan, but in 2 Chronicles it is called Zeredathah (4:17, KJV).

Zaredathah stood in the Jordan Valley. Nelson Glueck looked for it on the east bank of the river, proposing Tell es-Sa'idiyeh, but some more recent authors place it on the west bank, one theory identifying it with Tell el-Mazar, also spelled Mezar, in Wadi Far'a. Tell el-Mezar is at the site called in Arabic Qerawa, known from antiquity by the name Korea(i) (κορεα[ι]) or Koreous (Kορεους) and located at the foot of Mount Sartabe.

According to Hebrew Bible, the bronze castings for the Solomon's Temple were made in the clay grounds between Sukkot and Zaretan.

The old identification of the site of the miracle of the Israelites' crossing of the Jordan with the waters stopping their flow at the "city of Adam beside Zaretan" was, according to the Easton's Bible Dictionary (1893 and 1897), presumed to be near Succoth, where the Jabbok flows into the Jordan, about 30 miles upstream from the Israelite camp. There the priests stepped into the water, which then "stood and rose upon an heap", thus creating a 30-mile stretch of dry riverbed for the tribes to use for crossing over to the Promised Land (Joshua 3:16, 17; compare Psalms 104:3).

== Bible verses ==
- Joshua 3:16
- 1 Kings 7:46
- 2 Chronicles 4:17
