= Mahanaim =

Biblical place beyond the Jordan River

G20 M15 G1 N35 Aa15 D36 N25
mjꜣḥꜣnjmꜥ
in hieroglyphs
Era: 3rd Intermediate Period
(1069–664 BC)

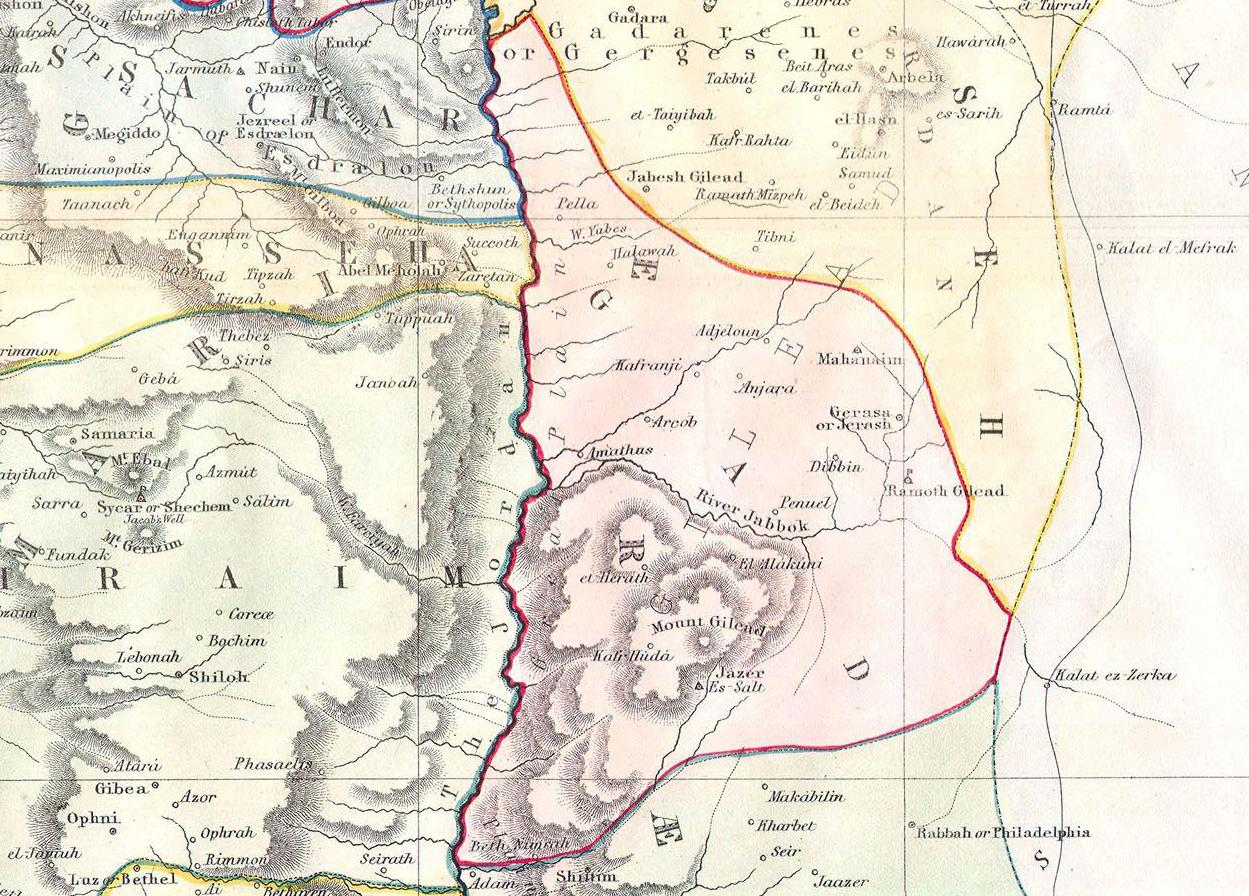
Territory of Gad on an 1852 map: Mahanaim can be seen in the northeast corner of the pink-shaded area of Gad

Mahanaim (Hebrew: מַחֲנַיִם Maḥănayīm, "camps") is a place mentioned a number of times by the Bible said to be near the Jabbok river, in the same general area as Jabesh-gilead, beyond the Jordan River. Although two possible sites have been identified, the precise location of Mahanaim is uncertain. Tell edh-Dhahab el-Gharbi, the western one of the twin Tulul adh-Dhahab tells, is one proposed identification.

== Biblical narrative ==
In the Biblical narrative, the first mention of Mahanaim occurs in the Book of Genesis as the place where Jacob, returning from Padan-aram to southern Canaan, has a vision of "the angels of God. Believing it to be "God's camp", Jacob names the place Mahanaim (Hebrew for "Two Camps", or "Two Companies") to memorialize the occasion of his own company sharing the place with God. Later in the story, Jacob is moved by fear at the approach of his brother Esau (whom he has reason to fear) and as a result divided his retinue into two hosts (two companies): hence the town built on the site took two hosts as its name.

According to the Book of Joshua and 1 Chronicles it became a Levitical city (Joshua 13:26–30, Joshua 21:38; cf. 1 Chronicles 6:80), having been located at the southern boundary of Bashan until the conquest of Canaan by the Israelites (Joshua 13:26–30).

Later in the Biblical narrative, around the start of the United Monarchy, the city was a stronghold that had been adapted to serve as a sanctuary for important fugitives (2 Samuel 18:2); the narrative states that after King Saul died, Abner, the commander of Saul's army, established Saul's son, Ish-bosheth, in Mahanaim as king of Israel. Mahanaim is then the location to which David is described as fleeing while at war with his son Absalom; having arrived at Mahanaim (2 Samuel 17:24), David is described as having sheltered with a man named Barzillai, and having mustered forces there to combat Absalom's army. It is also the location that the Bible states was the place where David was informed about his victory over Absalom, and the death of his son.

The "dance of Mahanaim" is mentioned in some translations of Song of Songs 6:13.

== Historical analysis ==
According to Gaston Maspero (The Struggle of the Nations, p. 773), Mahanaim was among the cities plundered by Shishak during his invasion (1 Kings 14:25) of Levantine territory, also Champollion, Rosellini and Budge share his view identifying Ma'hanema' with Mahanaim. There is no subsequent reference to the city in the annals, and it is not improbable that a vigorous resistance to Shishak or to some other invader brought about its utter demolition.
