= Damia, Jordan =

Damia
- Location in Jordan
- Coordinates: 32°06′15″N 35°33′09″E
- PAL: 202/167
- Country: Jordan
- Governorate: Balqa Governorate
- Time zone: UTC+2 (UTC+2)
  - Summer (DST): UTC+3 (UTC+3)
- Area code: +(962)5

Damia is a town in the Balqa Governorate of Jordan. It has been associated with the biblical City of Adam. It is near the Jisr ed-Damiye or Damiyah Bridge, which crosses the Jordan River to the West Bank.

Its population includes a number of families that belong to the Abbad clan such as Ramadneh. The land was accordingly owned mainly by the Abbad tribes with land closer to the river belonging to Al Masaeed tribe whose land extends beyond the Jordan to al-Jiftlik and towards the Jericho areas.

== See also ==
- Tell Damiyeh and Damiyeh Dolmen Fields, two nearby archaeological sites
