= Jacob wrestling with the angel =

Episode from the Book of Genesis

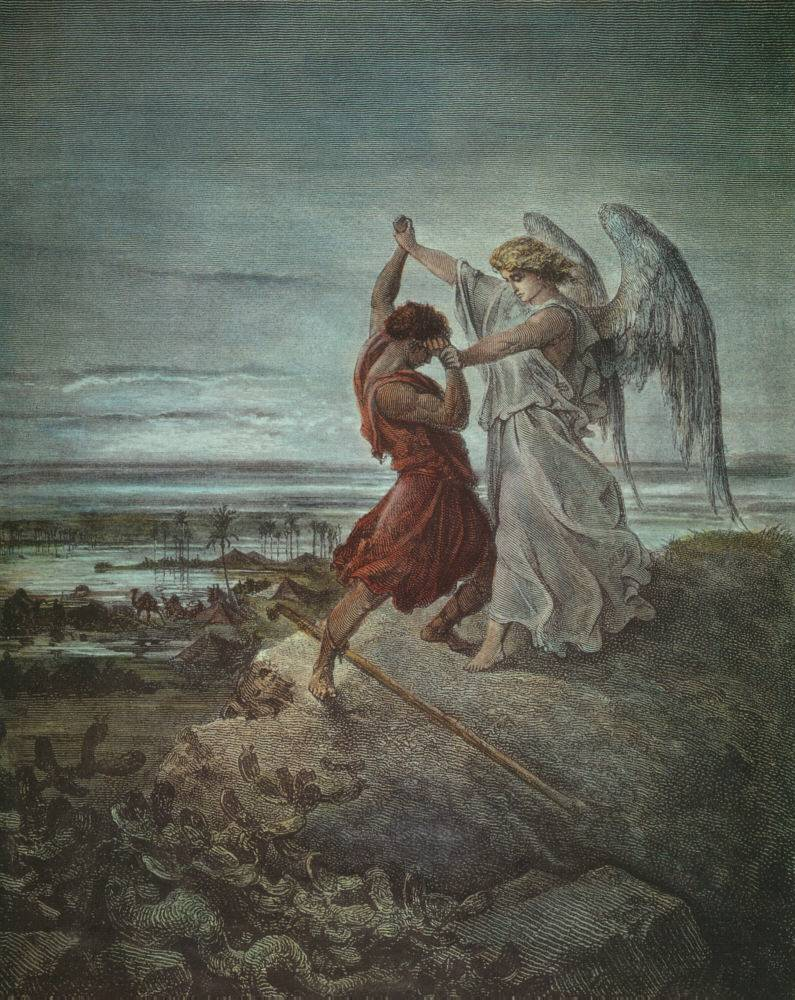
Gustave Doré, Jacob Wrestling with the Angel (1855)

Jacob wrestling with the angel is an incident described in the Book of Genesis (chapter 32:22–32; it is also referenced in the Book of Hosea. The "angel" in question is referred to as "man" (אִישׁ: Ish) and "God" (אֵל: El) in Genesis, while Hosea references an "angel" (מַלְאָךְ: Malakh). The account includes the renaming of Jacob as Israel (etymologized as "contends-with-God").

In the Genesis patriarchal narrative, Jacob spends the night alone on a riverbank during his journey back to Canaan. He encounters a "man" who proceeds to wrestle with him until dawn. In the end Jacob is given the name Israel and blessed, while the "man" refuses to give his own name. Jacob then names the place where they wrestled Penuel (פְּנוּאֵל: "face of God" or "facing God").

== Hebrew Bible ==
The Masoretic Text reads as follows:

On that night, he arose and took his two wives, his two maidservants, and his eleven sons, and he crossed over the Jabbok ford.
He took them and sent them over the river, and he sent over that which was his.
Jacob was left to his lonesome. A man wrestled with him until the break of dawn.
He saw that he was powerless against him. He struck the socket of his thigh, and the socket of Jacob's thigh was dislocated in his struggle with him.
He said, "Release me, for dawn is broken!" He said, "I will not release you, except if you bless me!"
He said to him, "What is your name?" He said, "Jacob."
He said, "Jacob will not be said as your name anymore, but Israel, for you struggled with God and with men, and you are capable!"
Jacob asked, and said, "Now, reveal your name!" He said, "Why is it that you ask for my name?" He blessed him there.
Jacob called the name of the place Peniel, "for I have seen God face-to-face, and my soul survives."
The sun shone on him when he passed Penuel, and he was limping over his thigh.
Verily, to this day the Israelites do not eat the 'forgotten sinew', which is over the socket of the thigh, for he struck in the socket of Jacob's thigh, in the forgotten sinew.

— Genesis 32:22–32: JPS translation

The account contains several plays on the meanings of Hebrew names—Peniel (or Penuel), Israel—as well as similarity to the root of Jacob's name (which sounds like the Hebrew for "heel", עָקֵב ʿaqeb) and its compound. The limping of Jacob (Yaʿaqob), may mirror the name of the river, Jabbok (יַבֹּק Yabboq), and Nahmanides (Deut. 2:10 of Jeshurun) gives the etymology "one who walks crookedly" (עָקֹב ʿaqob) for the name Jacob.

The Hebrew text states that it is a "man" (אִישׁ, LXX ἄνθρωπος, Vulgate vir) with whom Jacob wrestles, but later this "man" is identified with God (Elohim) by Jacob. Hosea 12:4 furthermore references an "angel" (malak). Following this, the Targum of Onkelos offers "because I have seen the Angel of the Lord face to face", and another Targum reads "because I have seen the Angels of the Lord face to face".

== Interpretations ==
The identity of Jacob's wrestling opponent is a matter of debate: he is named variously as a dream figure, a prophetic vision, an angel (such as Michael and Samael), a protective river spirit, Jesus or God.

=== Jewish interpretations ===
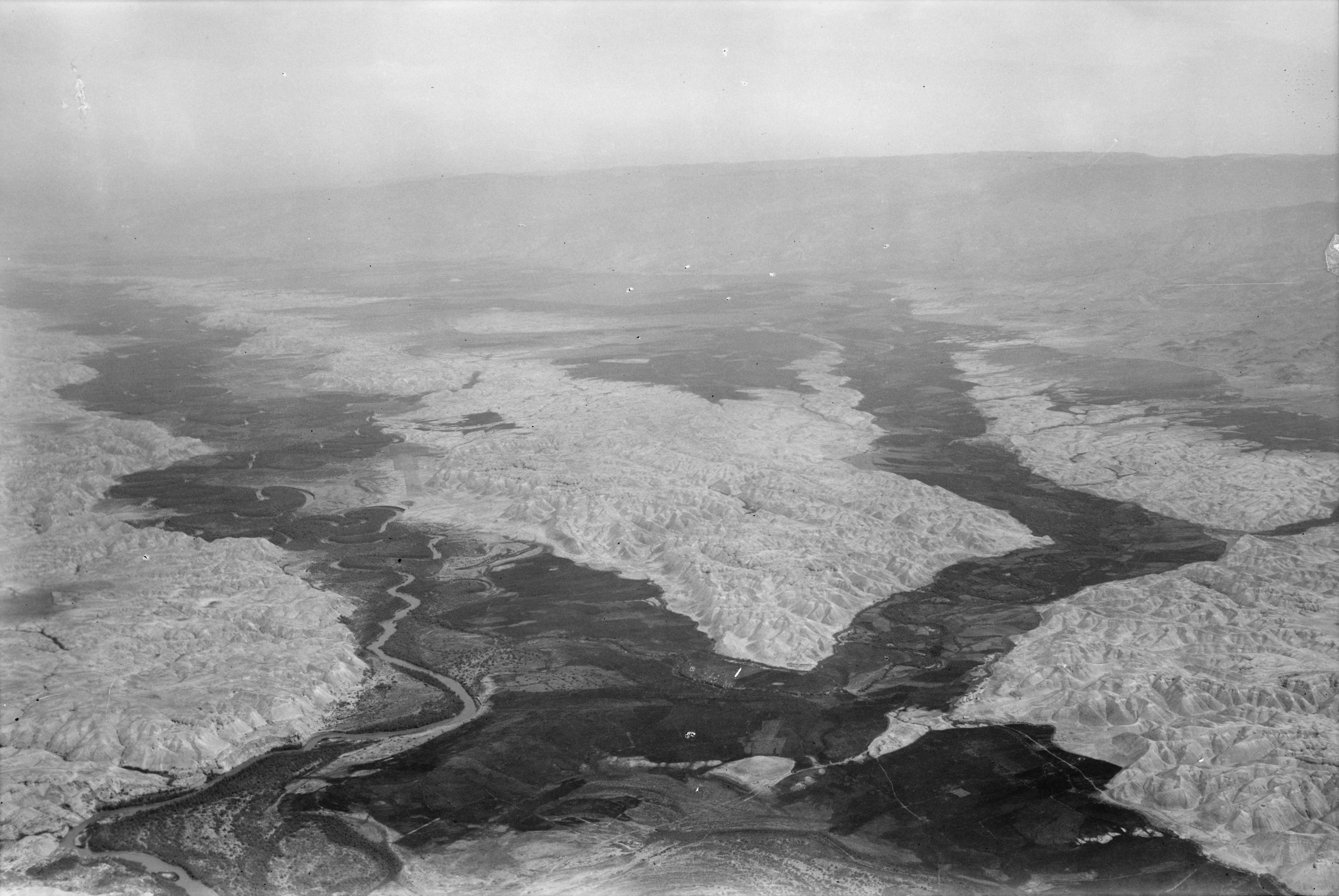
The apparent double crossing of the Jabbok was explained by b. Ḥullin 91a apud Rashi so: "He had forgotten some small jars and he returned for them."

In Hosea 12:5 Jacob's opponent is described as malakh, which means 'angel': "Yes, he had power over the angel, and prevailed: he wept, and made supplication to him: he found him in Bethel, and there he spoke with us". The relative age of the text of Genesis and of Hosea is unclear, as both are parts of the Hebrew Bible as redacted in the Second Temple Period, and it has been suggested that malakh may be a late emendation of the text, and thus represents an early Jewish interpretation of the episode.

Maimonides believed that the incident was "a vision of prophecy", while Rashi believed that Jacob wrestled with the guardian angel of Esau (identified as Samael), his elder twin brother. Zvi Kolitz (1993) referred to Jacob "wrestling with God".

As a result of the hip injury Jacob suffered while wrestling, Jewish law prohibits eating the gid hanasheh (sciatic nerve), which passes through the hip socket, requiring it to be removed from meat through the process of nikkur, as mentioned in the account in Genesis 32:33.

=== Christian interpretations ===
The interpretation that "Jacob wrestled with God" (glossed in the name Isra-'el) is common in Protestant theology, endorsed by the Protestant reformers Martin Luther and John Calvin (although Calvin believed that the event was "only a vision"), as well as later writers such as Joseph Barker (1854) or Peter L. Berger (2014). Other commentaries treat the expression of Jacob's having seen "God face to face" as referencing the Angel of the Lord as the "Face of God".

The proximity of the terms "man" and "God" in the text in some Christian commentaries has also been taken as suggestive of a Christophany. J. Douglas MacMillan (1991) suggests that the angel with whom Jacob wrestles is a "pre-incarnation appearance of Christ in the form of a man".

According to one Christian commentary on Jacob's words 'I saw God face to face', "Jacob's remark does not necessarily mean that the 'man' with whom he wrestled is God. Rather, as with other, similar statements, when one saw the 'angel of the Lord', it was appropriate to claim to have seen the face of God."

=== Other views ===
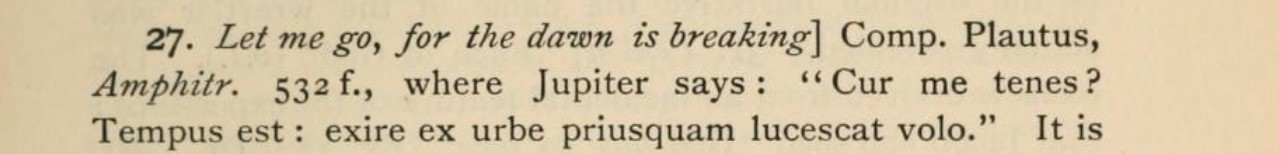
The Rev. John Skinner saw proof of extreme antiquity in a reflection of a widespread belief in night spirits that vanish at dawn.

In an analysis of the Marxist philosopher Ernst Bloch's 1968 book Atheism in Christianity, Roland Boer says that Bloch sees the incident as falling into the category of "myth, or at least legend". Boer calls this an example of "a bloodthirsty, vengeful God ... outdone by cunning human beings keen to avoid his fury".

The wrestling incident on the bank of a stream has been compared to the stories in Greek mythology about Achilles' duel with the river god Scamander and Menelaus wrestling with the sea-god Proteus.

Rosemary Ellen Guiley gives this summary:

"This dramatic scene has spurred much commentary from Judaic, Catholic, and Protestant theologians, biblical scholars, and literary critics. Does Jacob wrestle with God or with an angel? ... There is no definitive answer, but the story has been rationalized, romanticized, treated as myth, and treated symbolically."

== In arts ==
=== Visual arts ===
One of the oldest visual depictions is in the illustrated manuscript the Vienna Genesis. Many artists have depicted the scene, considering it as a paradigm of artistic creation. In sculpture Jacob Wrestling with the Angel is the subject of a 1940 sculpture by Sir Jacob Epstein on display at the Tate Britain. Paintings include:

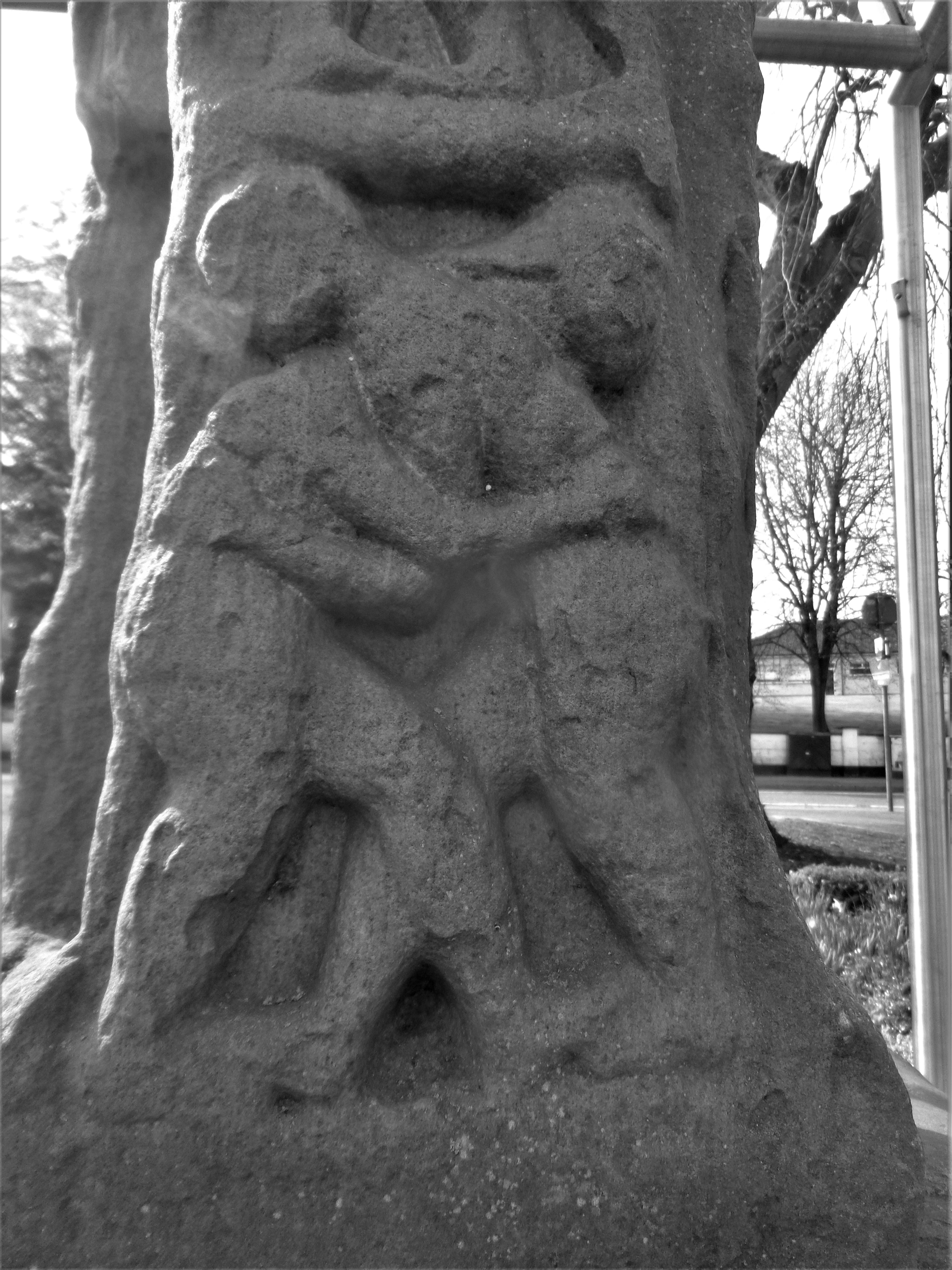
Depiction on a high cross in Kells, Ireland (10th century)

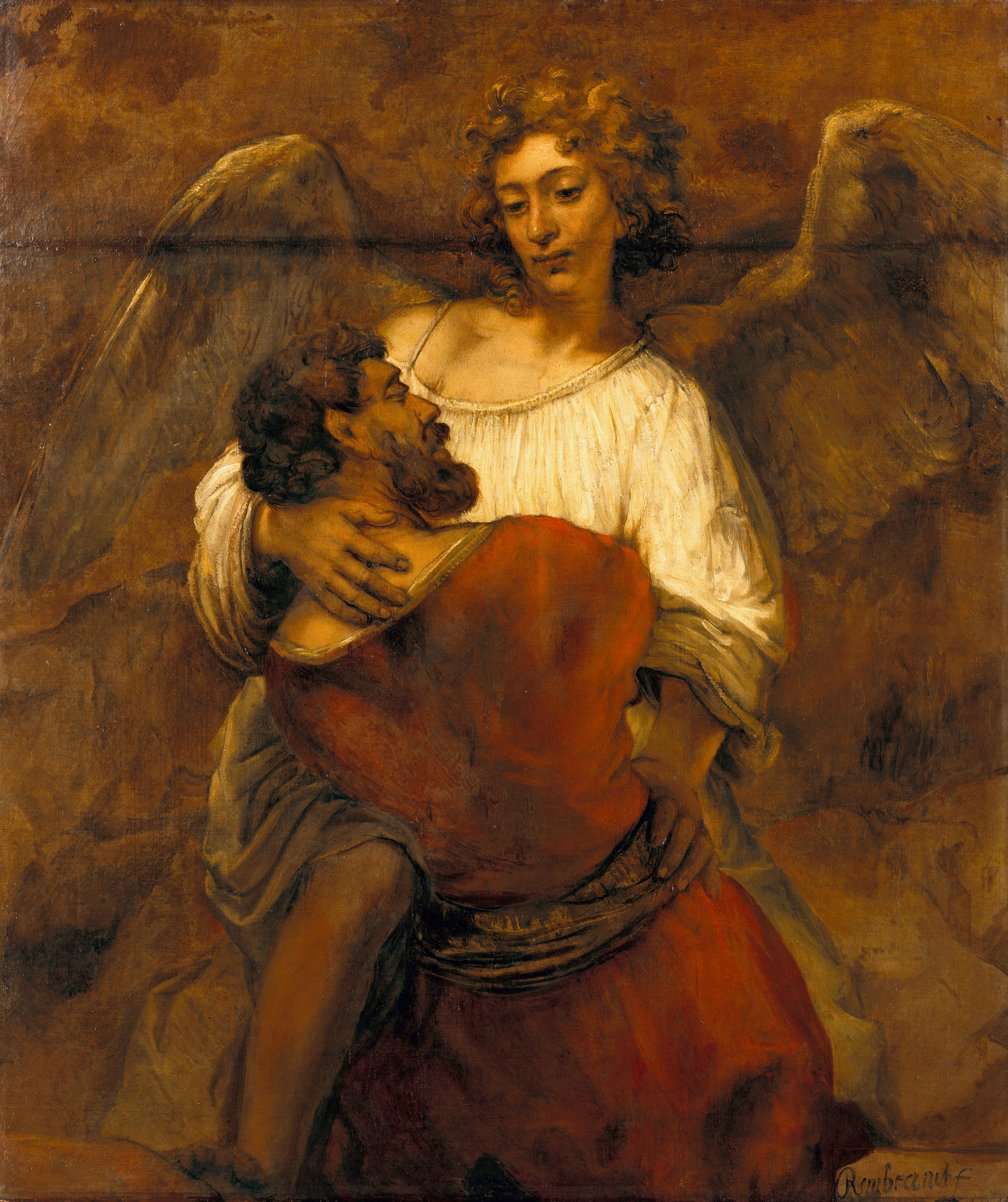
Rembrandt (1659)

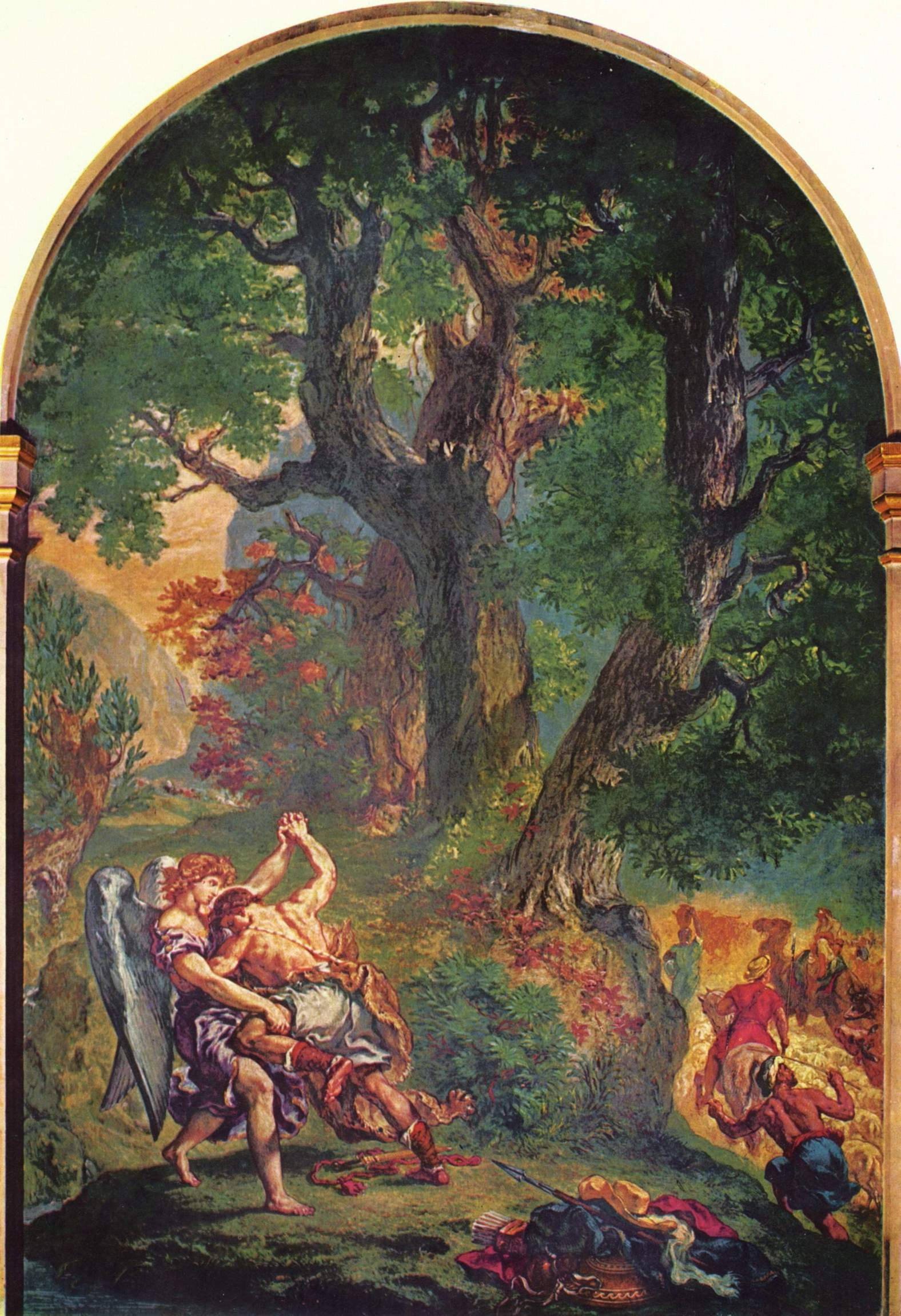
Eugène Delacroix (1861)

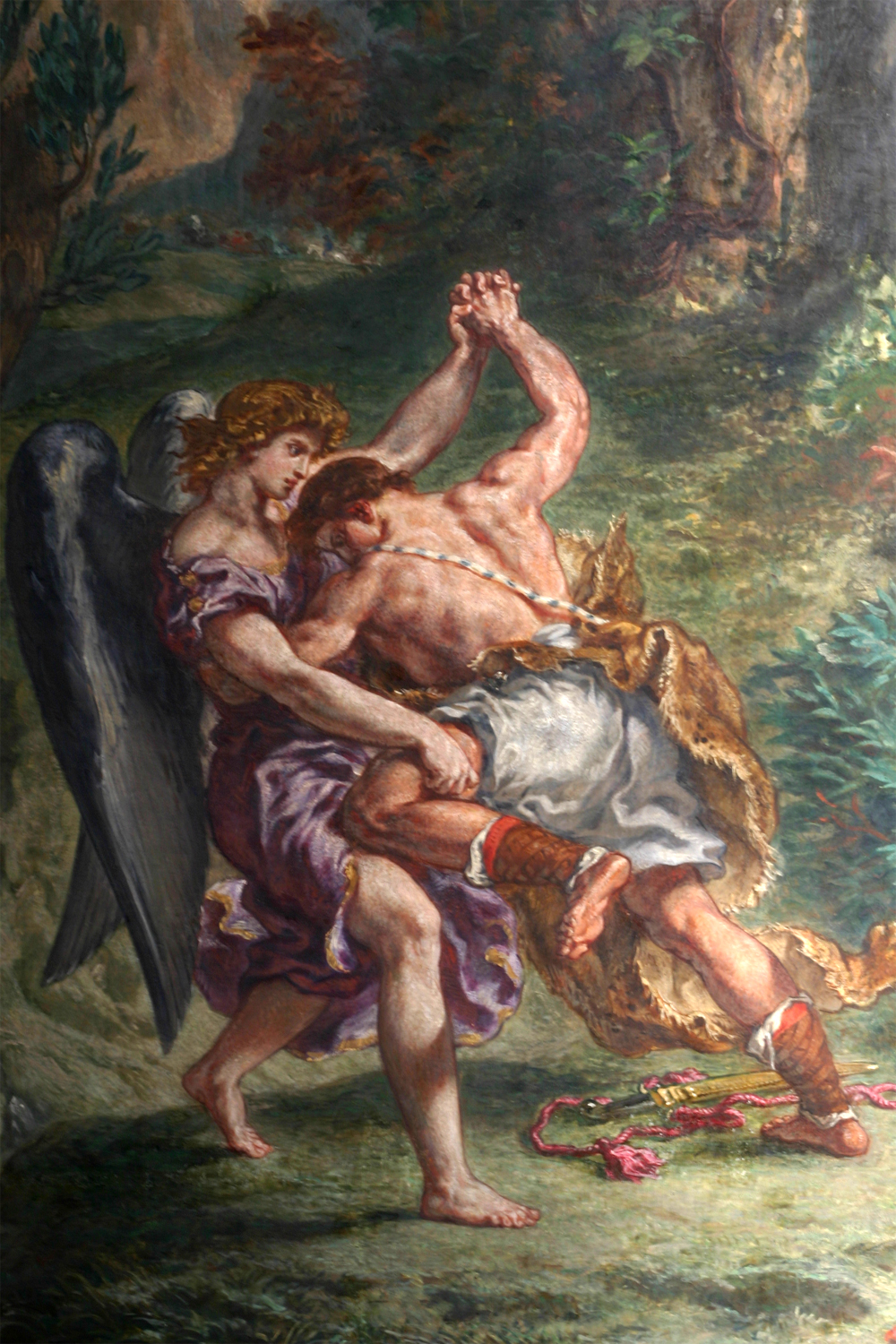
Eugène Delacroix (1861), (detail)

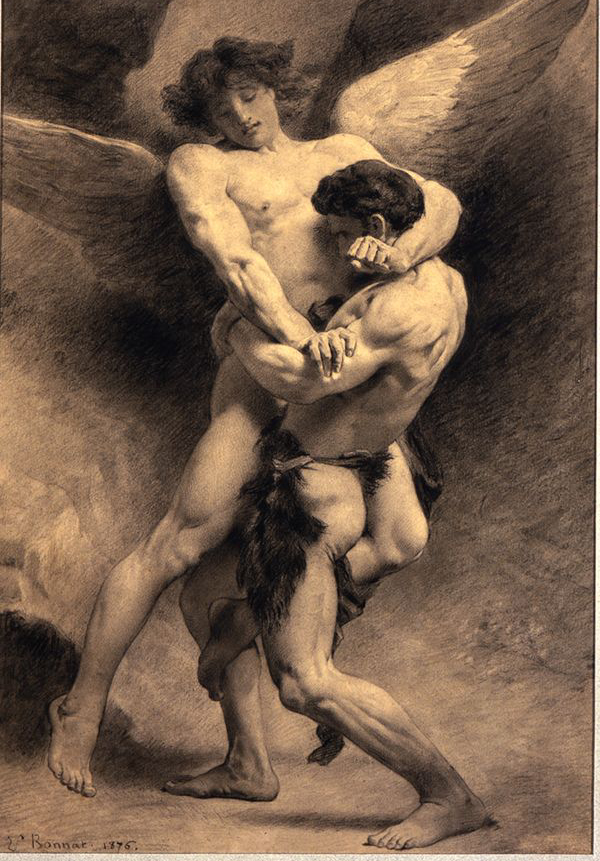
Léon Bonnat (1876)

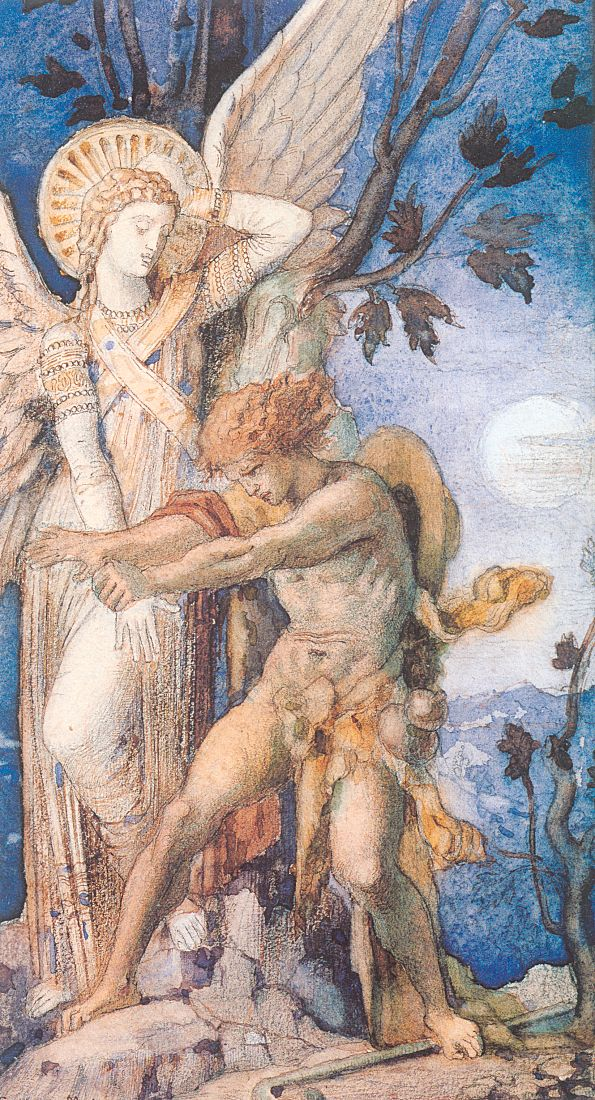
Jacob and the Angel by Gustave Moreau (1878)

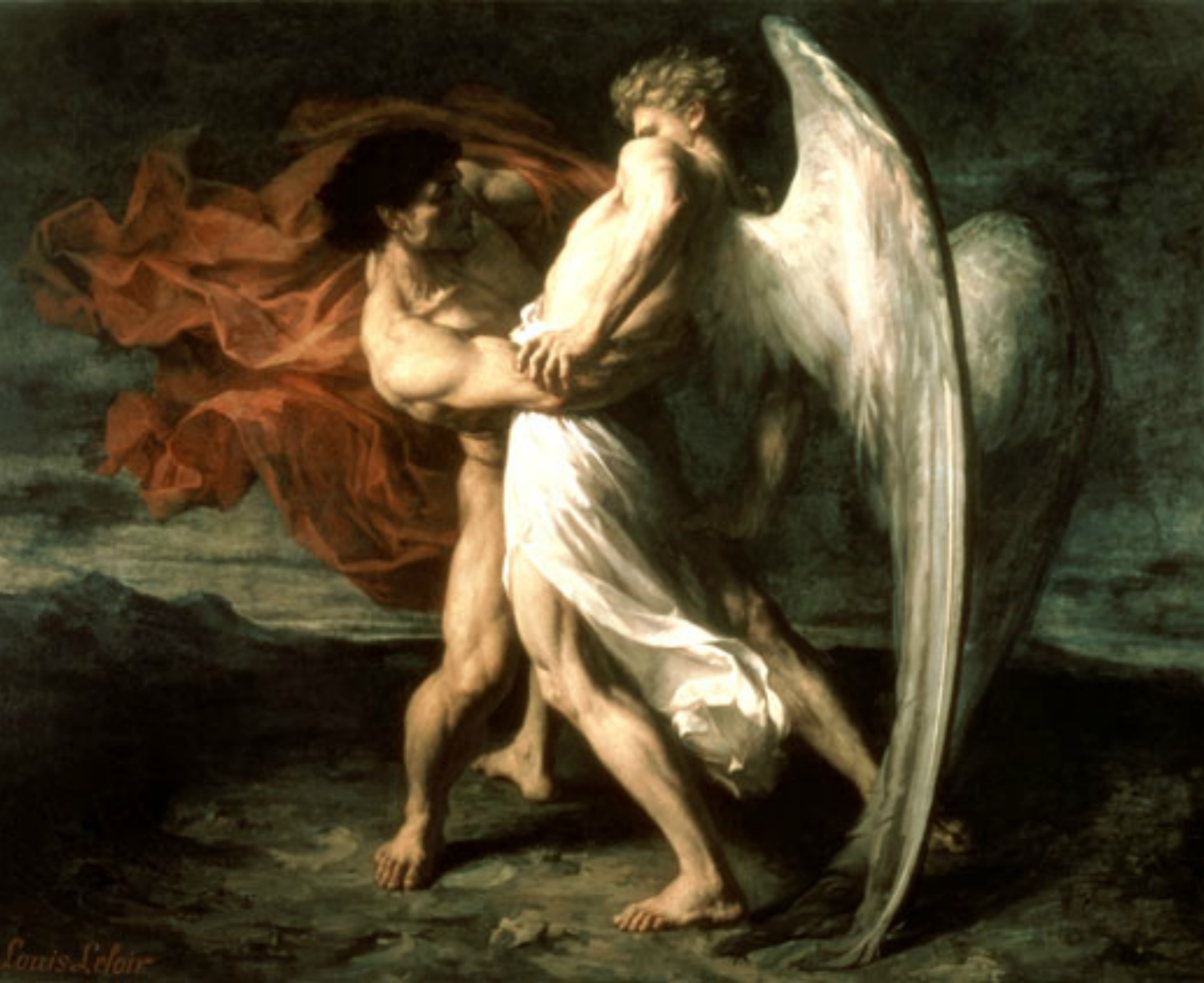
Alexander Louis Leloir (1865)

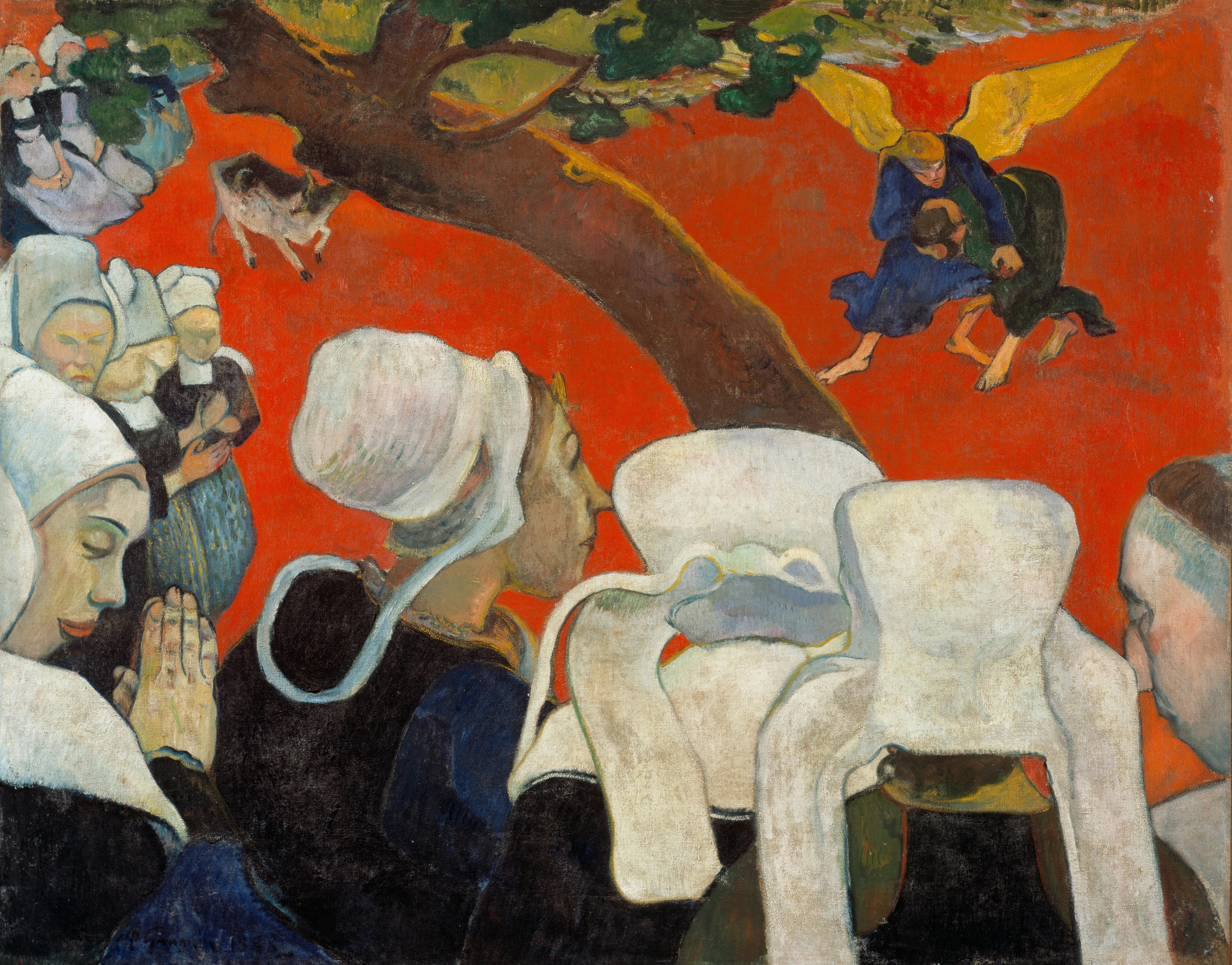
Paul Gauguin (1888), Vision after the Sermon showing the episode envisioned by Breton villagers.

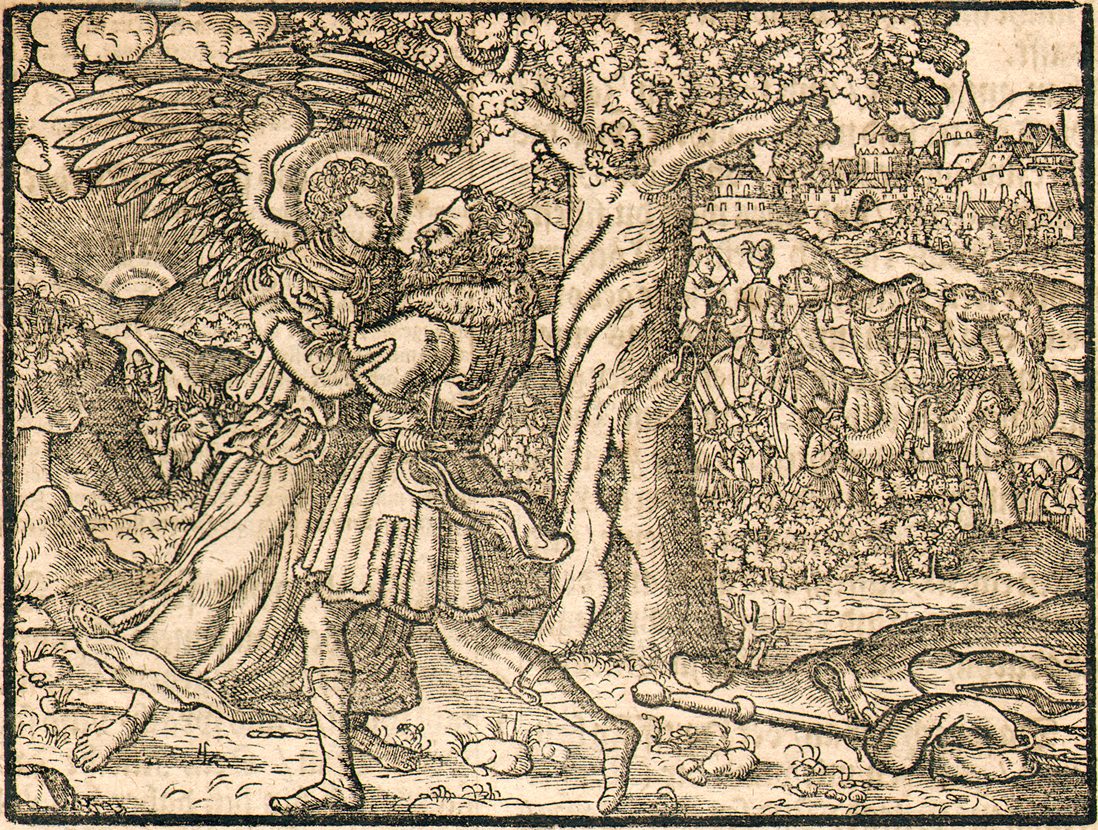
Jacob struggles with the angel, Gutenberg Bible (1558)

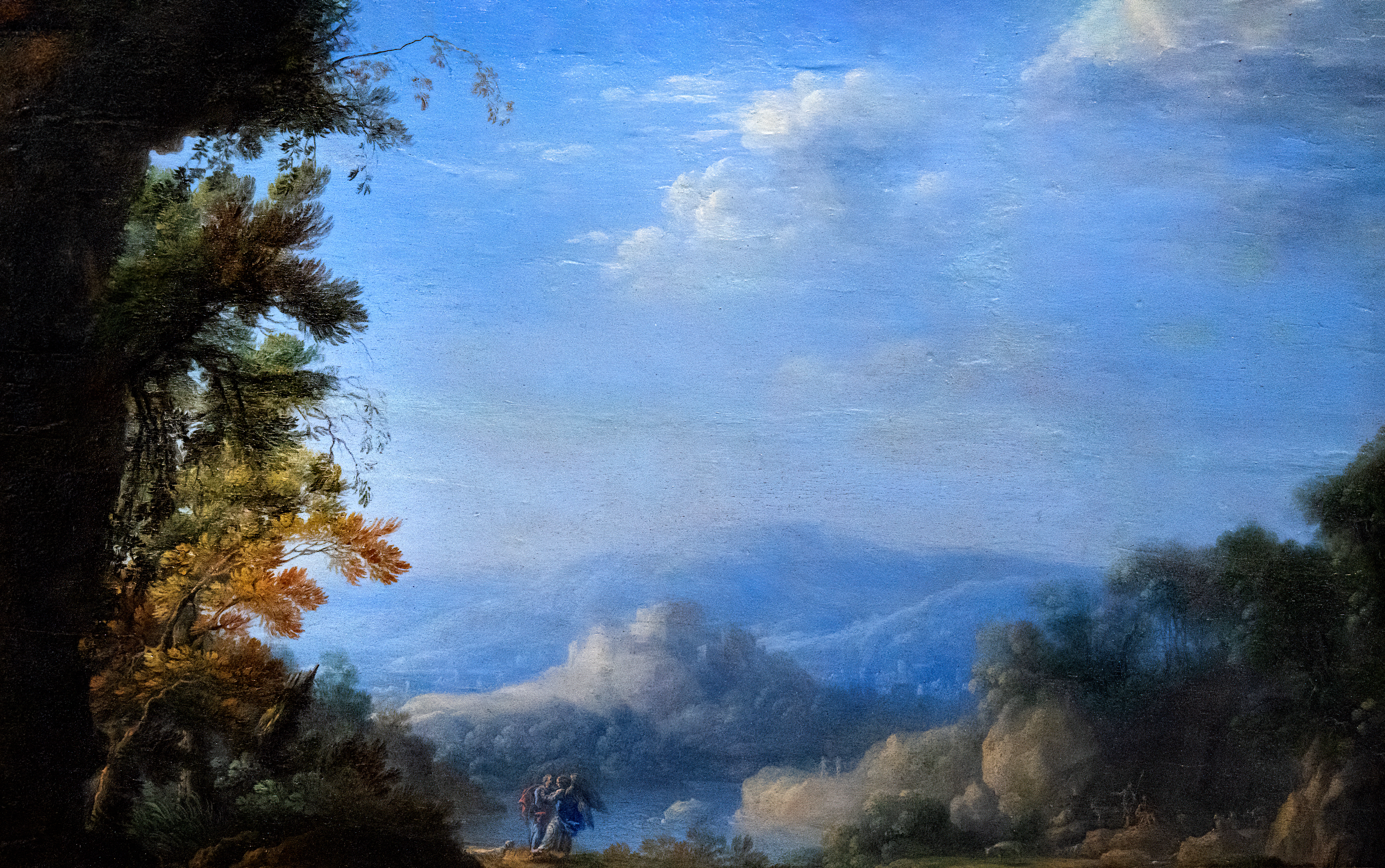
Landscape with Jacob Wrestling the Angel by Pierre Patel (17th Century)

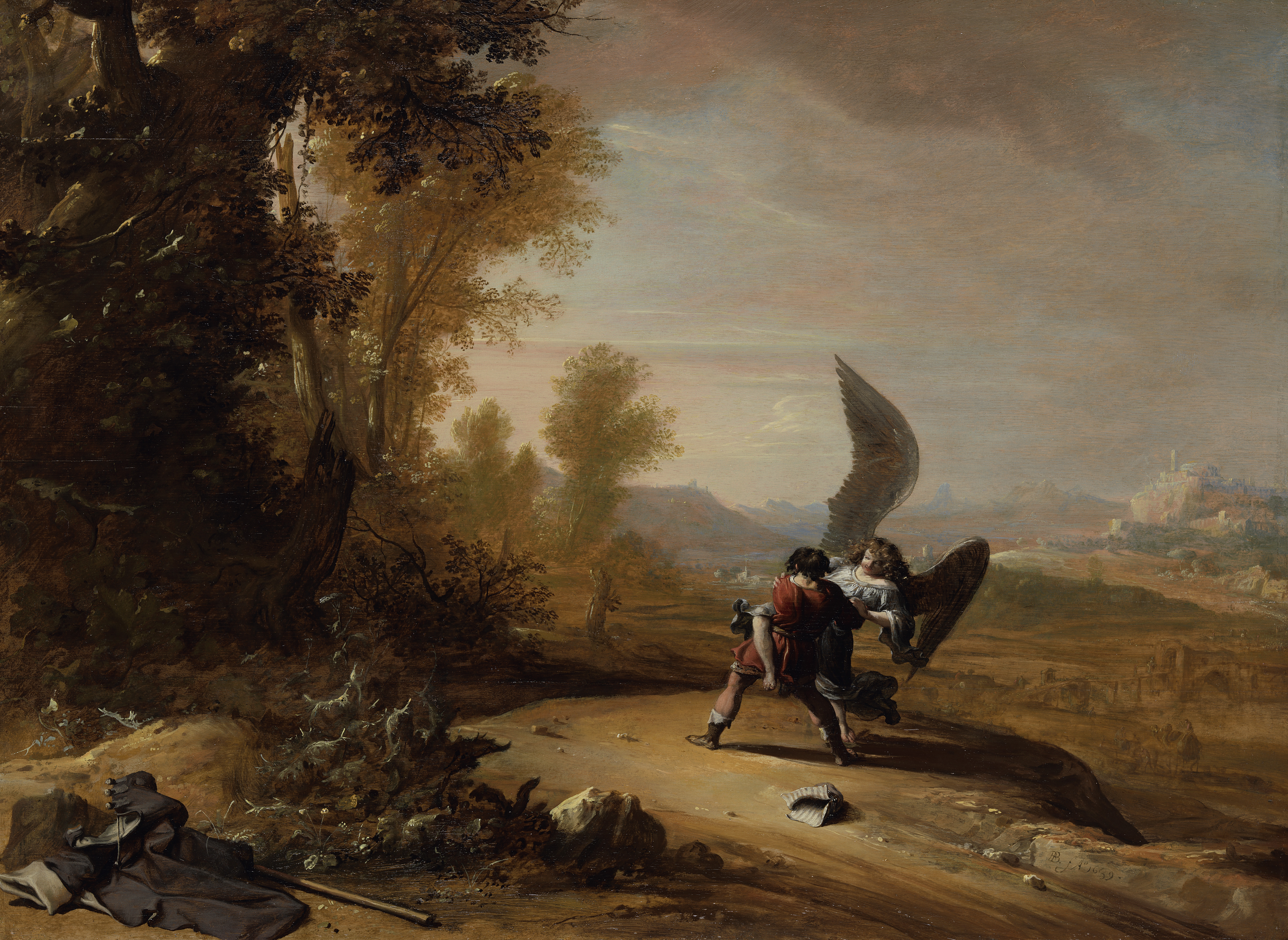
Jacob Wrestling with the Angel by Bartholomeus Breenbergh (1639)

=== In music ===
The Latin text of Genesis 32:30 'Vidi dominum facie ad faciem; et salva facta est anima mea' (I have seen the Lord face to face) was set for the third nocturn at Matins on the second Sunday of Lent and was a popular medieval telling of the story of Jacob's encounter with the angel. It is set as the tenor (upper voice) text of Guillaume de Machaut's multi-text-layered Motet Vidi dominum (M 15; I have seen the Lord) simultaneously with two secular French texts: "Faux semblant m'a decü" and "Amours qui ha le pouvoir." Machaut musically contrasts God's blessing in the Latin text with the disappointments of secular love in the French texts. Charles Wesley's hymn "Come, O Thou Traveller Unknown", often known as "Wrestling Jacob", is based on the passage which describes Jacob wrestling with an angel. It is traditionally sung to the tune of St Petersburg. U2's Bullet the Blue Sky, the 4th track on their 1987 album The Joshua Tree includes the lyric "Jacob wrestled the angel and the angel was overcome." The lyrics of Isaac, a song featured on Madonna's Confessions on a Dance Floor album, contains many allusions to the book of Genesis and references Jacob's encounter with the angel in the line "wrestle with your darkness, angels call your name". Noah Reid released his song "Jacob's Dream" as the second single of his 2020 second album. The song uses the metaphor of wrestling with angels to explore that "blessings are hard to come by and they cost you something," as Reid told Indie88. Mark Alburger's Israel in Trouble, Op. 57 (1997) includes the story in movement VIII. On his way.

=== In literature and theatre ===
The motif of "wrestling with the angels" occurs in several novels including Hermann Hesse's Demian (1919), Dodie Smith's I Capture the Castle (1948), and Margaret Laurence's The Stone Angel (1964). In T.H. White's The Once and Future King, the Wart is described as knowing that the work of training a hawk "had been like Jacob's struggle with the angel".

In poetry the theme appears in Rainer Maria Rilke's "The Man Watching" (c. 1920), Henry Wadsworth Longfellow's "Evangeline," Herman Melville's poem "Art," and Emily Dickinson's poem "A little East of Jordan" (Fr145B, 1860).

In theatre, wrestling with the angel is mentioned in Tony Kushner's play Angels in America (1990); the version depicted in its miniseries adaptation is the 1865 version by Alexander Louis Leloir.

Gustave Dore's image is reenacted in Jean-Luc Godard's Passion by a film extra dressed as an angel and Jerzy Radziwiłowicz.

Also Maud Hart Lovelace's Betsy's Wedding (1955), Stephen King's novel 11/22/63 (2011), Sheila Heti's novel Motherhood (2018) and David Fennario's play Balconville (1979). A short story in Daniel Mallory Ortberg's collection The Merry Spinster (2018) explores a version of the narrative as told from the perspective of the angel.

== See also ==
- Angel of the Lord
- Jacob's ladder
- Theophany
- List of angels in theology
