= City of Adam =

Biblical city

Coordinates: 32.103933°N 35.546789°E

The City of Adam (Hebrew adam ha-ir) is a place which appears in the Hebrew Bible's Book of Joshua 3:16, where it is described as standing "beside Zarethan" on the east bank of the Jordan. There, says the biblical text, the flow of the water was arrested, and rose up "upon an heap" at the time of the Israelites' passing over.

== Identification ==
=== Damiya ===
The classical identification is with Tell ed-Damye on the east bank of the River Jordan.

The nearby modern Jordanian village is called Damia.

== Bibliography ==
- History of the Tribes of Jordan and Palestine, Tribes of Jordan and Palestine (Fayez A. Farda)
