= 2 Chronicles 5 =

Second Book of Chronicles, chapter 5

- ← chapter 4 chapter 6 →
- The complete Hebrew text of the Books of Chronicles (1st and 2nd Chronicles) in the Leningrad Codex (1008 CE).
- Book: Books of Chronicles
- Category: Ketuvim
- Christian Bible part: Old Testament
- Order in the Christian part: 14

2 Chronicles 5 is the fifth chapter of the Second Book of Chronicles the Old Testament of the Christian Bibles or of the second part of the Books of Chronicles in the Hebrew Bible. The book is compiled from older sources by an unknown person or group, designated by modern scholars as "the Chronicler", and had the final shape established in late fifth or fourth century BCE. This chapter belongs to the section focusing on the kingship of Solomon (2 Chronicles 1 to 9). The focus of this chapter is the installation of the Ark of the Covenant in the temple.

== Text ==
This chapter was originally written in the Hebrew language and is divided into 14 verses.

=== Textual witnesses ===
Some early manuscripts containing the text of this chapter in Hebrew are of the Masoretic Text, which includes the Aleppo Codex (10th century) and Codex Leningradensis (1008).

There is also a translation into Koine Greek known as the Septuagint, made in the last few centuries BCE. Extant ancient manuscripts of the Septuagint version include Codex Vaticanus (B; $\mathfrak{G}$^{B}; 4th century), and Codex Alexandrinus (A; $\mathfrak{G}$^{A}; 5th century). (Note: The whole book of 2 Chronicles is missing from the extant Codex Sinaiticus.)

=== Old Testament references ===
- 2 Chronicles 5:1–14: 1 Kings 8:1–11

== The construction of the Temple completed (5:1) ==
This verse concludes the section started in 2 Chronicles 4:6 with the placement of temple decorations into the finished building.

=== Verse 1 ===
Thus all the work that Solomon made for the house of the Lord was finished: and Solomon brought in all the things that David his father had dedicated; and the silver, and the gold, and all the instruments, put he among the treasures of the house of God.

- Cross reference: 1 Kings 7:51

The construction of the temple started in Solomon's fourth year of years, took seven years to complete (1 Kings 6:1) and another thirteen years in furnishing it (1 Kings 9:1, 2), but this is not mentioned in the Chronicles.

== The Ark brought into the Temple (5:2–14) ==
The section parallels 1 Kings 8:1–13, except for verses 11b–13a, which points to the implementation of David's Levitical and priestly orders (1 Chronicles 15–16; 25–26). All participants were sanctified (cf 1 Chronicles 15:14) and all three musician families were present to play musical instruments and sing in unison 'For he is good, for his steadfast love endures for ever' (verse 13; cf. 1 Chronicles 16:41). Once the music begun, a cloud fill the house (verse 13), recalling the cloud which came down on the tent of meeting in the desert (cf. Numbers 12:5).

=== Verse 2 ===
Then Solomon assembled the elders of Israel, and all the heads of the tribes, the chief of the fathers of the children of Israel, unto Jerusalem, to bring up the ark of the covenant of the Lord out of the city of David, which is Zion.

- Cross reference: 1 Kings 8:1
- "City of David": here refers to the 'fortress of Zion in Jerusalem', not to Bethlehem (cf. 2 Samuel 5:7)

The transfer of the ark from Mount Zion to the temple on Mount Moriah was the first part of the celebration.

=== Verse 4 ===
And all the elders of Israel came; and the Levites took up the ark.

The Levites carried the ark in conformation with Moses' instructions (Deuteronomy 10:8; 31:25) and David's orders (1 Chronicles 15:2). In 1 Kings 8:3, 6 it was specified that the "priests" (who must be from the tribe of Levi) carried the ark, as Levites who were not priests were forbidden to enter the most holy place (as shown in verses 7 and 29:16).

== See also ==
- Ark of the Covenant
- Davidic line
- Tabernacle
- Related Bible parts: Exodus 25, Exodus 26, Leviticus 24, Numbers 8, 1 Kings 6, 1 Kings 7, 1 Kings 8, 2 Kings 16, 1 Chronicles 28

== Sources ==
- Ackroyd, Peter R (1993). "Chronicles, Books of". In Metzger, Bruce M; Coogan, Michael D (eds.). The Oxford Companion to the Bible. Oxford University Press. pp. 113–116. ISBN 978-0195046458.
- Bennett, William (2018). The Expositor's Bible: The Books of Chronicles. Litres. ISBN 978-5040825196.
- Coogan, Michael David (2007). Coogan, Michael David; Brettler, Marc Zvi; Newsom, Carol Ann; Perkins, Pheme (eds.). The New Oxford Annotated Bible with the Apocryphal/Deuterocanonical Books: New Revised Standard Version, Issue 48 (Augmented 3rd ed.). Oxford University Press. ISBN 9780195288810.
- Mabie, Frederick (2017). "I. The Chronicler's Genealogical Survey of All Israel". In Longman III, Tremper; Garland, David E (eds.). 1 and 2 Chronicles. The Expositor's Bible Commentary. Zondervan. pp. 267–308. ISBN 978-0310531814.
- Mathys, H. P. (2007). "14. 1 and 2 Chronicles". In Barton, John; Muddiman, John (eds.). The Oxford Bible Commentary (first (paperback) ed.). Oxford University Press. pp. 267–308. ISBN 978-0199277186.
- Würthwein, Ernst (1995). The Text of the Old Testament. Translated by Rhodes, Erroll F. Grand Rapids, MI: William B. Eerdmans. ISBN 0-8028-0788-7.
