= 2 Chronicles 4 =

Second Book of Chronicles, chapter 4

- ← chapter 3 chapter 5 →
- The complete Hebrew text of the Books of Chronicles (1st and 2nd Chronicles) in the Leningrad Codex (1008 CE).
- Book: Books of Chronicles
- Category: Ketuvim
- Christian Bible part: Old Testament
- Order in the Christian part: 14

2 Chronicles 4 is the fourth chapter of the Second Book of Chronicles the Old Testament of the Christian Bible or of the second part of the Books of Chronicles in the Hebrew Bible. The book is compiled from older sources by an unknown person or group, designated by modern scholars as "the Chronicler", and had the final shape established in late fifth or fourth century BCE. This chapter belongs to the section focusing on the kingship of Solomon (2 Chronicles 1 to 9). The focus of this chapter is the construction of the temple's interior decoration.

== Text ==
This chapter was originally written in the Hebrew language and is divided into 22 verses.

=== Textual witnesses ===
Some early manuscripts containing the text of this chapter in Hebrew are of the Masoretic Text, which includes the Aleppo Codex (10th century) and Codex Leningradensis (1008.

There is also a translation into Koine Greek known as the Septuagint, made in the last few centuries BCE. Extant ancient manuscripts of the Septuagint version include Codex Vaticanus (B; $\mathfrak{G}$^{B}; 4th century), and Codex Alexandrinus (A; $\mathfrak{G}$^{A}; 5th century). (Note: The whole book of 2 Chronicles is missing from the extant Codex Sinaiticus.)

=== Old Testament references ===
- 2 Chronicles 4:1–5: 1 Kings 7:23–26
- 2 Chronicles 4:6–8: 1 Kings 7:38–39
- 2 Chronicles 4:11–18: 1 Kings 7:40–47
- 2 Chronicles 4:19–22: 1 Kings 7:48–51

== The bronze altar and molten sea (4:1–5) ==
This section records the construction of the bronze altar (verse 1; cf. 1 Kings 8:64; 2 Kings 16:14–15; 2 Chronicles 1:5; Ezekiel 43:13–17) and the molten sea (verses 2–5; cf. 1 Kings 7:23–26). The altar was a formidable object, probably made of wood and covered with bronze, with the measures probably referring to the base.

=== Verse 1 ===
Then he made a bronze altar that was twenty cubits long, twenty cubits wide, and ten cubits high.

- "Cubit": a measurement unit of about 18 inches (460 mm); thus 20 cubits would have been about 30 feet (9.1 m) (for the length and width of the altar) and 10 cubits would have been about 15 feet (4.6 m) (for the height).

=== Verse 2 ===
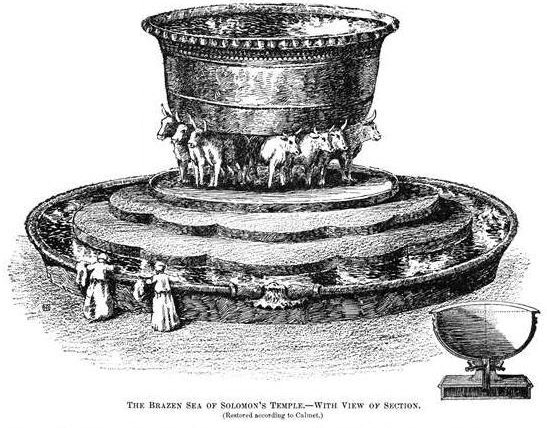
An artist's rendition of the Molten Sea (or Brazen Sea) of Solomon, published in the 1906 Jewish Encyclopedia.

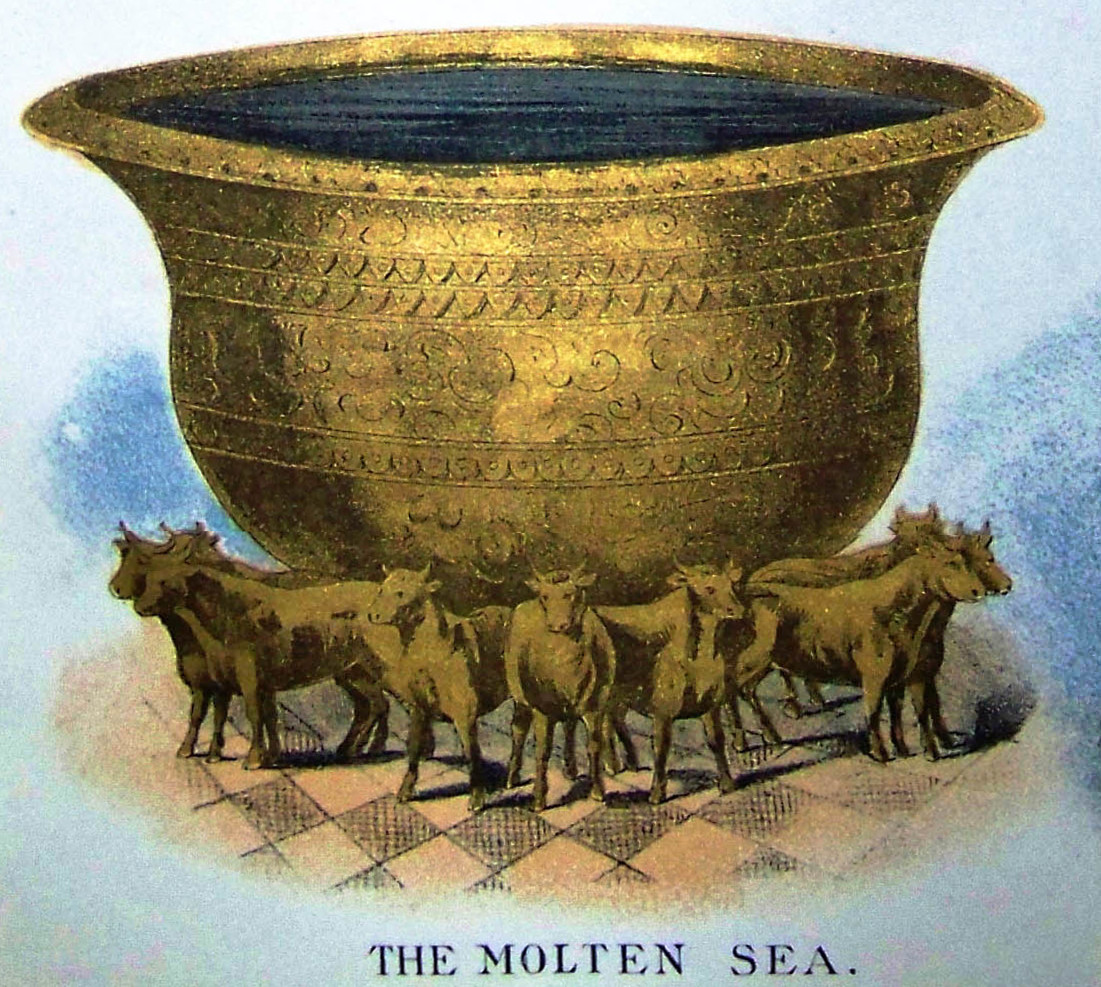
Molten Sea illustration in the Holman Bible, 1890

Also he made a molten sea of ten cubits from brim to brim, round in compass, and five cubits the height thereof; and a line of thirty cubits did compass it round about.

- Cross reference: 1 Kings 7:23
- "5 cubits": a length measurement of about 7.5 ft (2.3 m).
- "30 cubits": about 45 ft (14 m).

The approximation of the mathematical constant "π" ("pi"), defined as the ratio of a circle's circumference to its diameter, can apparently be calculated from this verse as 30 cubits divided by 10 cubits to yield "3". However, Matityahu Hacohen Munk observed that the spelling for "line" in Hebrew, normally written as קו qaw, in 1 Kings 7:23 is written (ketiv) as קוה qaweh. Using gematria, qaweh yields "111" whereas qaw yields "106", so when used in calculation $\frac{30}{10} * \frac {111}{{106}}$ it results in π = "3.1415094", very close to the modern definition of "3.1415926". Charles Ryrie gives another explanation based on verse 5 (cf. 1 Kings 7:26) that the molten sea has a brim of a handbreadth (about 4 inches or 100 millimetres) wide, so when the inside diameter, subtracting 10 cubits (about 180 inches or 4,600 millimetres ; from outer "brim to brim") with 2 times 4 inches (100 mm) (two handbreadth) to yield 172 inches (4,400 mm), is divided by π, it results in 540 inches (14,000 mm) or 30 cubits which is the circumference given in this verse.

=== Verse 5 ===
And the thickness of it was an handbreadth, and the brim of it like the work of the brim of a cup, with flowers of lilies; and it received and held three thousand baths.

- "Handbreadth": a measurement of length of about 3 inches (76 mm).
- "Bath"": a measurement of volume of about 6 gallons or 22 liters, so "3000 baths" would have been about 18,000 gallons, or 66,000 liters.

== The temple's interior (4:6–22) ==
Verse 10–22 closely parallel 1 Kings 7:39–50 except for the omission of materials in 1 Kings 7:27–37. 1 Kings 7:38 corresponds to 2 Chronicles 4:6, while 1 Kings 7:38–39a is reworked at 2 Chronicles 4:6a, but verses 6b–9 have no parallel in Kings, and 1 Kings 7:39b—51 corresponds to 2 Chronicles 4:10-5:1. The (lengthy) passage in Kings concerning the stands for the basins is only found in verse 14. The function of the basin (verse 6) is related to Exodus 30:17-21, where a copper basin is used for ceremonial washing. The list of golden materials in verses 7–9 corresponds to that in 1 Kings 7:48–50 (cf. verses 19–22), presented in the order of the Chronicler's (original) list in 1 Chronicles 28:15–18. Whereas the tabernacle was equipped with only one lampstand (Exodus 25:31–40; 31:8; Leviticus 24:1–4; Numbers 8:2–4), an interesting similarity to 13:11, there were ten in the Temple (verse 7; cf. multiple lampstands in 1 Chronicles 28:15; 2 Chronicles 4:20; 1 Kings 7:49). Both the tabernacle (Exodus 25:23-30; 26:35; Leviticus 24:5–9; 2 Chronicles 13:11) and Solomon's temple according to 1 Kings 7:48 only mention one shewbread table, but there were ten in verse 8, and by contrast to the one, the ten tables in the Chronicles (1 Chronicles 28:16) are not explicitly characterized as covered in gold. Whereas 1 Kings 6:36 only briefly mentions the inner courtyard, the Chronicler clearly distinguishes between the priests' court (1 Kings 6:36; 7:12) and the precinct for laymen.

=== Verse 17 ===
In the plain of Jordan did the king cast them, in the clay ground between Succoth and Zeredathah.

- "Zeredathah" from Hebrew: צְרֵדָֽתָה: is written as "Zaretan" (צָרְתָֽן) in 1 Kings 7:46 (cf. Joshua 3:16; possibly the same as Zererath in Judges 7:22). "Zĕrēdāthāh" means "towards Zĕrĕdāh" (1 Kings 11:26), so both names denote the same place. Succoth and Zeredah were located east of the Jordan River.

== See also ==
- Ark of the Covenant
- Davidic line
- Tabernacle
- Related Bible parts: Exodus 25, Exodus 26, Leviticus 24, Numbers 8, 1 Kings 6, 1 Kings 7, 1 Kings 8, 2 Kings 16, 1 Chronicles 28

== Sources ==
- Ackroyd, Peter R (1993). "Chronicles, Books of". In Metzger, Bruce M; Coogan, Michael D (eds.). The Oxford Companion to the Bible. Oxford University Press. pp. 113–116. ISBN 978-0195046458.
- Bennett, William (2018). The Expositor's Bible: The Books of Chronicles. Litres. ISBN 978-5040825196.
- Coogan, Michael David (2007). Coogan, Michael David; Brettler, Marc Zvi; Newsom, Carol Ann; Perkins, Pheme (eds.). The New Oxford Annotated Bible with the Apocryphal/Deuterocanonical Books: New Revised Standard Version, Issue 48 (Augmented 3rd ed.). Oxford University Press. ISBN 9780195288810.
- Mabie, Frederick (2017). "I. The Chronicler's Genealogical Survey of All Israel". In Longman III, Tremper; Garland, David E (eds.). 1 and 2 Chronicles. The Expositor's Bible Commentary. Zondervan. pp. 267–308. ISBN 978-0310531814.
- Mathys, H. P. (2007). "14. 1 and 2 Chronicles". In Barton, John; Muddiman, John (eds.). The Oxford Bible Commentary (first (paperback) ed.). Oxford University Press. pp. 267–308. ISBN 978-0199277186.
- Würthwein, Ernst (1995). The Text of the Old Testament. Translated by Rhodes, Erroll F. Grand Rapids, MI: William B. Eerdmans. ISBN 0-8028-0788-7.
