= 2 Chronicles 6 =

Second Book of Chronicles, chapter 6

- ← chapter 5 chapter 7 →
- The complete Hebrew text of the Books of Chronicles (1st and 2nd Chronicles) in the Leningrad Codex (1008 CE).
- Book: Books of Chronicles
- Category: Ketuvim
- Christian Bible part: Old Testament
- Order in the Christian part: 14

2 Chronicles 6 is the sixth chapter of the Second Book of Chronicles the Old Testament of the Christian Bible or of the second part of the Books of Chronicles in the Hebrew Bible. The book is compiled from older sources by an unknown person or group, designated by modern scholars as "the Chronicler", and had the final shape established in late fifth or fourth century BCE. This chapter belongs to the section focusing on the kingship of Solomon (2 Chronicles 1 to 9). The focus of this chapter is Solomon's prayer and speech at the consecration of the temple.

== Text ==
This chapter was originally written in the Hebrew language and is divided into 42 verses.

=== Textual witnesses ===
Some early manuscripts containing the text of this chapter in Hebrew are of the Masoretic Text, which includes the Aleppo Codex (10th century) and Codex Leningradensis (1008.

There is also a translation into Koine Greek known as the Septuagint, made in the last few centuries BCE. Extant ancient manuscripts of the Septuagint version include Codex Vaticanus (B; $\mathfrak{G}$^{B}; 4th century), and Codex Alexandrinus (A; $\mathfrak{G}$^{A}; 5th century). (Note: The whole book of 2 Chronicles is missing from the extant Codex Sinaiticus.)

=== Old Testament references ===
- 2 Chronicles 6:1–11: 1 Kings 8:12–21
- 2 Chronicles 6:12–42: 1 Kings 8:22–53

== Solomon blesses the LORD (6:1–11) ==
The first part of this chapter starts with a doxology, followed by Solomon's speech about God's choice of Jerusalem and David for the temple's construction, that Davidic promises regarding them (1 Chronicles 17:1–15) have been fulfilled.

=== Verse 1 ===
Then Solomon spoke:

"The Lord said He would dwell in the dark cloud."

- Cross reference: 1 Kings 8:12

The Hebrew expression that God 'wished to dwell in darkness' links to God's manifestation on Mount Sinai (Exodus 20:21; Deuteronomy 4:11; 5:22).

=== Verse 11 ===
The Chronicler sharpens the portrayal of David in relationship with Moses, most significantly in this verse where at three points the Chronicler eliminated or altered allusions to the exodus themes found in Samuel-Kings (1 Kings 8:21):

Comparison in Masoretic Text and KJV
1 Kings 8:21	2 Chronicles 6:11
ארוןמקום ל ואשם שם אשר־שם ברית יהוה אבתינו־אשר כרת עם בהוציאו אתם מארץ מצרים	ארוןאת־ה ואשים שם אשר־שם ברית יהוה בני ישראל־אשר כרת עם
And I have set there a place for the ark, wherein is the covenant of the Lord, which he made with our fathers, when he brought them out of the land of Egypt.	And in it have I put the ark, wherein is the covenant of the Lord, that he made with the children of Israel.

== Solomon's prayer of dedication (6:12–42) ==
The second part of the chapter contains a prayer of dedication that consists of seven petitions concerning a variety of predicaments in which Israel may find, including defeat by enemies (verses 24–25), drought (verses 26–27), open pitched battles (verses 34–35) or exile (verses 36–39), in each case of which Solomon asks God to be attentive to the prayers of His people from His heavenly dwelling. Verses 32–33 concern with foreigners, whose significance to the people of Israel would be increased in the time between the writing of the books of Kings and that of the books of Chronicles. The theme of Babylonian Exile in 1 Kings 8 had developed into the theme of diaspora (for examples, in Babylon and Egypt) in the Chronicler's time, so the phrase 'and grant them compassion in the sight of their captors, so that they may have compassion on them' in 1 Kings 8:50 is omitted in the Chronicles here, although interestingly it is taken up in the letter written by Hezekiah to the rest of the northern kingdom (2 Chronicles 30:9). In contrast to 1 Kings 8 the Chronicler omits the reference to the Exodus and therefore to Moses in verse 40 (as in verse 11), but ends in a more positive tone by taking and changing Psalm 132:8–10 to enhance the importance of the ark and the anointed (such as the terms 'salvation' in place of 'righteousness', 'rejoice' in place of 'shout for joy', and goodness).

=== Verse 13 ===
For Solomon had made a brasen scaffold, of five cubits long, and five cubits broad, and three cubits high, and had set it in the midst of the court: and upon it he stood, and kneeled down upon his knees before all the congregation of Israel, and spread forth his hands toward heaven.

- "Brasen scaffold": or "bronze platform" in NKJV, NIV, NASB, is only found here. The Hebrew word for "scaffold", כִּיּור, kîyôr (see 2 Chronicles 4:6), occurs 21 times in KJV and other than here is translated 18 times as "laver", once as "pan" (1 Samuel 2:14), and once as "hearth" (Zechariah 12:6), thus in this verse it evidently means a sort of basin-shaped stand, like a “laver” turned upside down, and most likely hollow underneath (cf. Nehemiah 9:4 for an analogous structure).

== See also ==
- Ark of the Covenant
- Davidic line
- Tabernacle
- Related Bible parts: Exodus 25, Exodus 26, Leviticus 24, Numbers 8, 1 Kings 6, 1 Kings 7, 1 Kings 8, 2 Kings 16, 1 Chronicles 28, Psalm 132

== Sources ==
- Ackroyd, Peter R (1993). "Chronicles, Books of". In Metzger, Bruce M; Coogan, Michael D (eds.). The Oxford Companion to the Bible. Oxford University Press. pp. 113–116. ISBN 978-0195046458.
- Bennett, William (2018). The Expositor's Bible: The Books of Chronicles. Litres. ISBN 978-5040825196.
- Coogan, Michael David (2007). Coogan, Michael David; Brettler, Marc Zvi; Newsom, Carol Ann; Perkins, Pheme (eds.). The New Oxford Annotated Bible with the Apocryphal/Deuterocanonical Books: New Revised Standard Version, Issue 48 (Augmented 3rd ed.). Oxford University Press. ISBN 9780195288810.
- Mabie, Frederick (2017). "I. The Chronicler's Genealogical Survey of All Israel". In Longman III, Tremper; Garland, David E (eds.). 1 and 2 Chronicles. The Expositor's Bible Commentary. Zondervan. pp. 267–308. ISBN 978-0310531814.
- Mathys, H. P. (2007). "14. 1 and 2 Chronicles". In Barton, John; Muddiman, John (eds.). The Oxford Bible Commentary (first (paperback) ed.). Oxford University Press. pp. 267–308. ISBN 978-0199277186.
- Throntveit, Mark A. (2003). "Was the Chronicler a Spin Doctor? David in the Books of Chronicles". Word & World. 23 (4): 374–381.
- Würthwein, Ernst (1995). The Text of the Old Testament. Translated by Rhodes, Erroll F. Grand Rapids, MI: William B. Eerdmans. ISBN 0-8028-0788-7.
