= 1 Kings 4 =

Biblical chapter

- ← chapter 3 chapter 5 →
- The pages containing the Books of Kings (1 & 2 Kings) Leningrad Codex (1008 CE).
- Book: First book of Kings
- Hebrew Bible part: Nevi'im
- Order in the Hebrew part: 4
- Category: Former Prophets
- Christian Bible part: Old Testament
- Order in the Christian part: 11

1 Kings 4 is the fourth chapter of the Book of Kings in the Hebrew Bible and the First Book of Kings in the Old Testament of the Christian Bible. The book is a compilation of annals documenting the deed of the kings of Israel and Judah by a Deuteronomistic compiler in the seventh century BCE, with a supplement added in the sixth century BCE. Chapter 4 belongs to the section of Kings focusing on the reign of Solomon over the unified kingdom of Judah and Israel (1 Kings 1 to 11). The focus of this chapter is on Solomon's reign as king of Israel.

== Text ==
The chapter was originally written in Biblical Hebrew and is divided into 34 verses in many Christian Bibles and 20 verses in the Hebrew Bible.

=== Textual witnesses ===
Some early manuscripts containing the text of this chapter in Biblical Hebrew belong to the Masoretic Textual tradition, including the Codex Cairensis (895), Aleppo Codex (10th century), and Codex Leningradensis (1008).

The chapter was also translated into Koine Greek as part of the Septuagint, produced during the final centuries BCE. Extant Septuagint manuscripts containing this chapter include Codex Vaticanus (B; $\mathfrak{G}$^{B}; 4th century CE) and Codex Alexandrinus (A; $\mathfrak{G}$^{A}; 5th century CE). (Note: The entire book of 1 Kings is absent from the extant portions of Codex Sinaiticus.)

== Analysis ==
The structure of the first 28 verses of this chapter centers on the abundant provision of Solomon's table:

A Solomon's royal officials and officers (4:1–19)

B Judah and Israel eat, drink and rejoice (4:20)

C Solomon rules over kingdoms between the Euphrates and Egypt (4:21)

D Provisions of Solomon's table (4:22–23)

C' Solomon rules over kingdoms between the Euphrates and Egypt (4:24)

B' Judah and Israel are living in safety (4:25)

A' Officers provide for Solomon's household (4:26–28)

The section starting from 1 Kings 4:29 to 1 Kings 5:12 is organized as a chiasm:

A Solomon's wisdom (4:29–34)

B Hiram sends servants to Solomon (5:1)

C Solomon's message to Hiram (5:2–6)

B' Hiram's response to Solomon (5:7–11)

A' Solomon's wisdom (5:12)

== Solomon's royal officials and officers (verses 1–19) ==
The orderly structure of the kingdom shows the quality of Solomon's wisdom, resulting in happy and prosperous citizens, fulfilling not only the Abrahamic promise (Genesis 22:17), but also the fruit of Joshua's conquest (Joshua 11:23). A comparison with David's list of officers (2 Samuel 8:16–18; 20:23–26) demonstrate the continuity and development of the court, with the increase of the number of ministers: some remained (Ado[ni]ram] and Jehoshaphat), some removed (Joab and Abiathar), one promoted (Benaiah), and some as rewards to his party followers (Zadok's son, Azariah, and Nathan's sons in verse 5). Provincial governors were assigned in the twelve provinces of Israel, mainly of northern Israel, not including Jerusalem and the land of Judah, nor the 'foreign possessions' (verses 7–19). The geographical organization of the list is interesting: beginning with the central mountains of Ephraim, moving north (Naphtali, Asher, and Issachar) and concluding with the south and south-east (Benjamin and Gad).

=== Verse 6 ===
And Ahishar was over the household: and Adoniram the son of Abda was over the tribute.

- "Over the household": from Hebrew: על־הבית, ‘al-ha-bā-yiṯ; a position first mentioned here, indicating the growing size of royal court; later in Ahab's and Hezekiah's court (cf. 1 Kings 18:3; 2 Kings 18:18; Isaiah 22:15).
- "Adoniram" is also mentioned in 1 Kings 5:14 and 12:18, where the name is spelled "Adoram" (cf. 2 Samuel 20:24); also spelled as "Hadoram" (2 Chronicles 10:18). He was stoned to death by the Israelites to whom Rehoboam sent him, as a collector of tribute, after the revolt of the ten tribes to Jeroboam.
- "The tribute": or "forced labor" (NKJV), not the same as the Israelite labor force in 1 Kings 5:13 (cf. 1 Kings 11:28; 12:3–4).

== Solomon's prosperity and wisdom (verses 20–34) ==
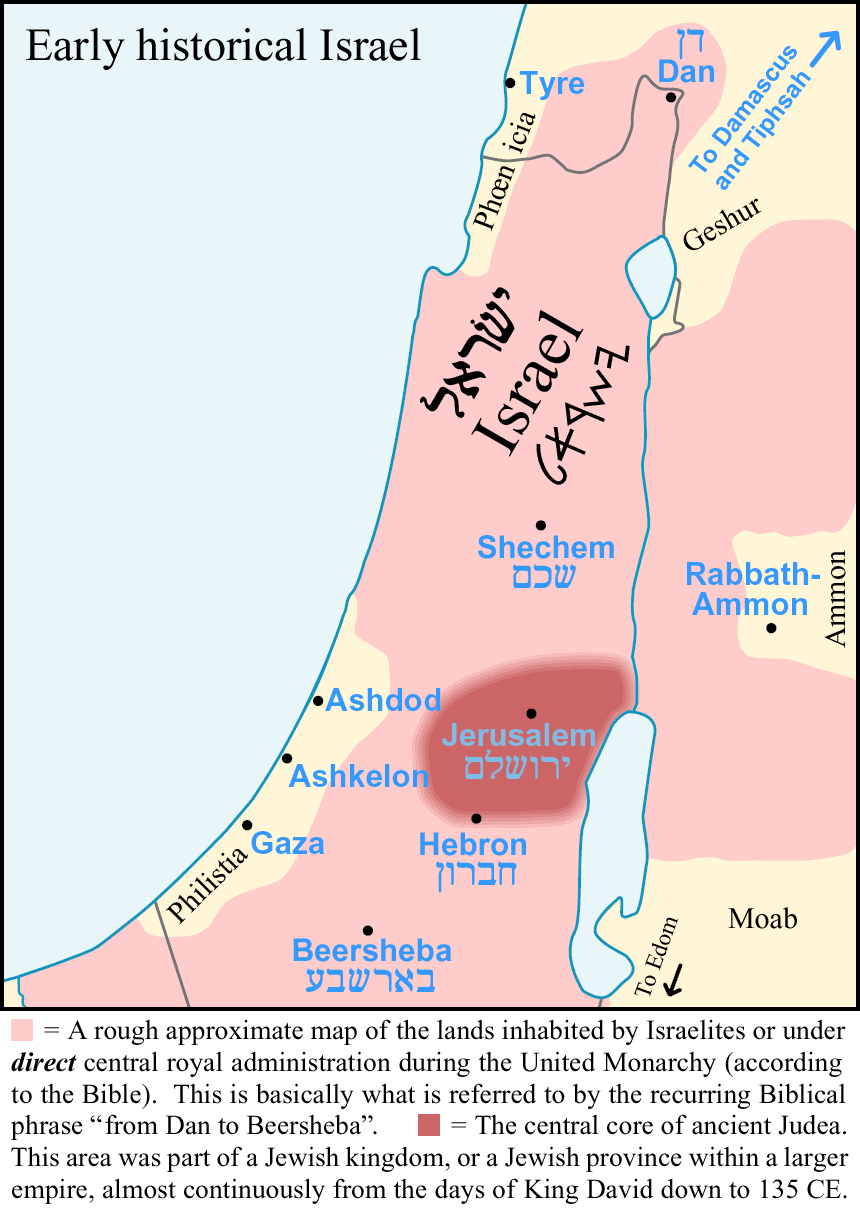
A map of Israel during the United Monarchy (Tiphsah was a trade outpost in northern Syria, at the bend in the Upper Euphrates)

Under Solomon, the kingdom prospered and had a security from the neighboring states from the Euphrates to Egypt, while the state administration had become larger and more centralized since the time of Saul.

Verses 29–34 focus on Solomon's wisdom, fulfilling his prayer for wisdom in 1 Kings 3:1–15, more on the academic aspect, instead of as a king or a judge. In Solomon's time, science was already international, with the texts of wisdom from the whole of the ancient Near East (as found in archaeology) containing accumulated general knowledge. Solomon is named as the author of the many proverbs (verse 32; Proverbs 10:1; 25:1; hence also Proverbs 1:1) and songs (Psalm 72, Psalm 127; Song 1:1). He also has ability to enumerate creation in natural order (verse 33; cf. Job 38–39, Psalm 104, and Genesis 1).

== See also ==
- Bashan
- Beersheba
- Dan
- David
- Egypt
- Gilead
- Israel
- Jerusalem
- Jezreel
- Mahanaim
- Megiddo
- Zartanah
- Related Bible parts: 2 Chronicles 1, Job 38, Job 39, Psalm 72, Psalm 88, Psalm 89, Psalm 127

== Sources ==
- Collins, John J. (2014). "Chapter 14: 1 Kings 12 – 2 Kings 25". Introduction to the Hebrew Scriptures. Fortress Press. pp. 277–296. ISBN 978-1451469233.
- Coogan, Michael David (2007). Coogan, Michael David; Brettler, Marc Zvi; Newsom, Carol Ann; Perkins, Pheme (eds.). The New Oxford Annotated Bible with the Apocryphal/Deuterocanonical Books: New Revised Standard Version, Issue 48 (Augmented 3rd ed.). Oxford University Press. ISBN 978-0195288810.
- Dietrich, Walter (2007). "13. 1 and 2 Kings". In Barton, John; Muddiman, John (eds.). The Oxford Bible Commentary (first (paperback) ed.). Oxford University Press. pp. 232–266. ISBN 978-0199277186.
- Halley, Henry H. (1965). Halley's Bible Handbook: an abbreviated Bible commentary (24th (revised) ed.). Zondervan Publishing House. ISBN 0-310-25720-4.
- Hayes, Christine (2015). Introduction to the Bible. Yale University Press. ISBN 978-0300188271.
- Leithart, Peter J. (2006). 1 & 2 Kings. Brazos Theological Commentary on the Bible. Brazos Press. ISBN 978-1587431258.
- McKane, William (1993). "Kings, Book of". In Metzger, Bruce M; Coogan, Michael D (eds.). The Oxford Companion to the Bible. Oxford University Press. pp. 409–413. ISBN 978-0195046458.
- Metzger, Bruce M; Coogan, Michael D, eds. (1993). The Oxford Companion to the Bible. Oxford University Press. ISBN 978-0195046458.
- Würthwein, Ernst (1995). The Text of the Old Testament. Translated by Rhodes, Erroll F. Grand Rapids, MI: Wm. B. Eerdmans. ISBN 0-8028-0788-7.
