= 1 Kings 7 =

1 Kings, chapter 7

- ← chapter 6 chapter 8 →
- The pages containing the Books of Kings (1 & 2 Kings) Leningrad Codex (1008 CE).
- Book: First book of Kings
- Hebrew Bible part: Nevi'im
- Order in the Hebrew part: 4
- Category: Former Prophets
- Christian Bible part: Old Testament
- Order in the Christian part: 11

1 Kings 7 is the seventh chapter of the Book of Kings in the Hebrew Bible and the First Book of Kings in the Old Testament of the Christian Bible. The book is a compilation of annals documenting the deed of the kings of Israel and Judah by a Deuteronomistic compiler in the seventh century BCE, with a supplement added in the sixth century BCE. Chapter 7 belongs to the section of Kings focusing on the reign of Solomon over the unified kingdom of Judah and Israel (1 Kings 1 to 11). The focus of this chapter is on Solomon's reign as king of Israel.

== Text ==
The chapter was written in Biblical Hebrew and is divided into 51 verses in both Jewish and Christian bibles.

=== Textual witnesses ===
Early manuscripts containing the text of this chapter in Biblical Hebrew are of the Masoretic Text tradition, including Codex Cairensis (895 CE), the Aleppo Codex (10th century CE), and Codex Leningradensis (1008 CE). Fragments containing parts of this chapter were found among the Dead Sea Scrolls as 4Q54 (4QKgs; 50–25 BCE), with extant portions of verses 20–21, 25–27, 29–42, and 51.

A translation into Koine Greek, known as the Septuagint, was made from a Hebrew text in the last few centuries BCE. Extant ancient manuscripts of the Septuagint text of this chapter include Codex Vaticanus (B; $\mathfrak{G}$^{B}; 4th century CE) and Codex Alexandrinus (A; $\mathfrak{G}$^{A}; 5th century CE). (Note: The whole book of 1 Kings is missing from the extant Codex Sinaiticus.)

=== Parallel biblical passages ===
Parts of the account of the construction and furnishing of Solomon's Temple have parallels in 2 Chronicles 2–5:

- Verses 13–14 parallel 2 Chronicles 2:13–14.
- Verses 15–22 parallel 2 Chronicles 3:15–17.
- Verses 23–26 parallel 2 Chronicles 4:2–5.
- Verses 38–39 parallel 2 Chronicles 4:6 and 4:10.
- Verses 40–47 parallel 2 Chronicles 4:11–18.
- Verses 48–50 parallel 2 Chronicles 4:7–8 and 4:19–22.
- Verse 51 parallels 2 Chronicles 5:1.

== Analysis ==
1 Kings 6 to 7 cover the building of the temple, with insertions of information about Solomon's palace, the "house of the forest of Lebanon", the hall of the throne, the hall of judgment, and a house for Pharaoh's daughter (1 Kings 7:1–12).

== Construction of the palace (7:1–12) ==
The temple was integrated into a larger complex of government buildings; by itself, it is comparable to a palace chapel. Other buildings were larger and took almost twice as long to build as the Temple alone (13 years vs. 7 years), but seem to share a similar architectural style and material. The monumental "House of the Forest of the Lebanon" was apparently named for its richly crafted and precious Lebanese timber, measuring roughly 50x25 meters, with 45 pillars supporting the ceiling, and partly an upper floor perhaps functions as the royal bodyguard's armoury and quarters (cf. 1 Kings 10:17; Isaiah 22:8).

=== Verse 4 ===
There were windows with beveled frames in three rows, and window was opposite window in three tiers.

- "Windows" from Hebrew: שְׁקֻפִים, the same word as in 1 Kings 6:4 denoting "beams" or "lattices" ("beam layers" according to Keil; πλευρῶν in Septuagint). They were arranged in "three rows" (or "tiers"), probably referring to "three stories formed by the three rows of beams", so that the side chambers had "their windows exactly vis-a-vis in each of the three stories" (as explained by Josephus: θυρώμασι τριγλύφοις, "windows in three divisions" in Ant., 7:05.2).

== The interior decoration of the Temple (7:13–51) ==
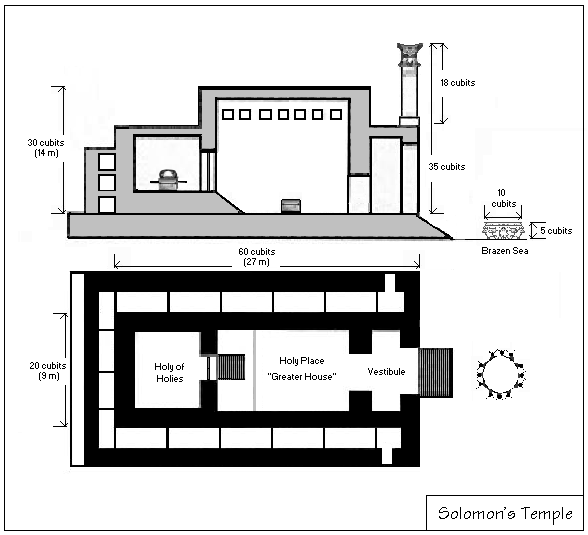
Solomon's Temple design with measurements

The big structures and furnishings in the temple of Solomon were crafted by a Phoenician craftsman called Hiram (or Ahiram), especially the two pillars that stood at the entrance to the temple (verses 15–22), and the circular bronze sea ("molten sea"; verses 23–26), among those listed in verses 40–47. A note states that Solomon established his own ore refinery in the Jordan Valley to produce the necessary bronze material. Other holy instruments and royal blessing-gifts were richly covered with gold (verses 48–51).

=== Verses 13–14 ===
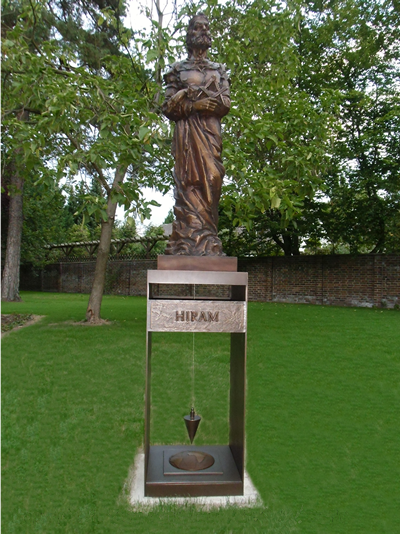
Bronze statue of Hiram by Nickolaus-Otto Kruch, Berlin, Germany (2013)

^{13} And King Solomon sent and brought Hiram from Tyre.
^{14} He was the son of a widow of the tribe of Naphtali, and his father was a man of Tyre, a worker in bronze. And he was full of wisdom, understanding, and skill for making any work in bronze. He came to King Solomon and did all his work.

- "Hiram from Tyre": called "Huram-abi" in 2 Chronicles 2:13, not to be confused with the Phoenician king in 1 Kings 5. Spelled as "Hiram Abiff, he becomes the central character of an allegory presented to all candidates during the third degree in Freemasonry.

=== Verse 21 ===
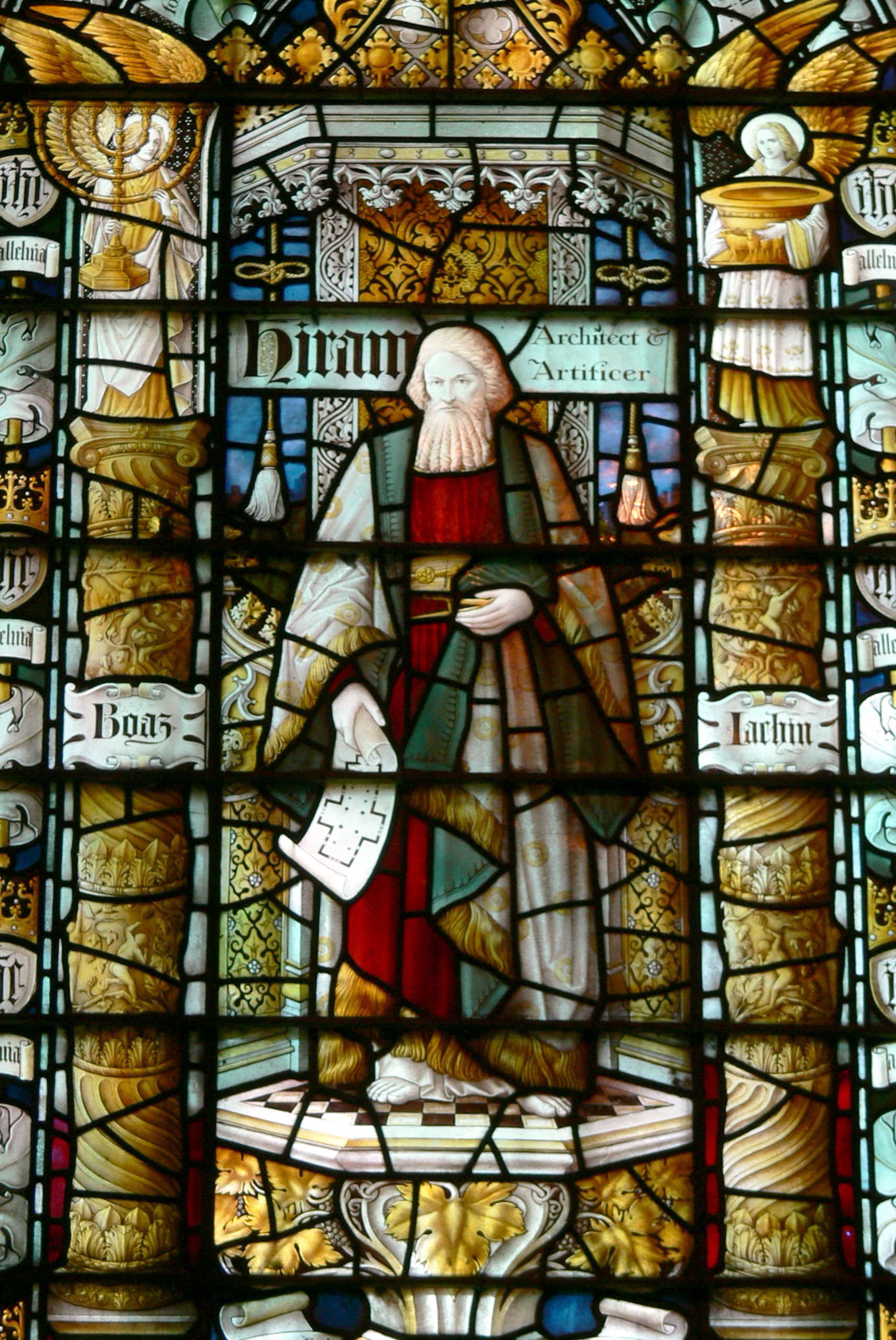
Stained glass window (1900) at St John's Church, Chester (England), showing Hiram, the architect of the temple in Jerusalem, between the pillars named "Boaz" and "Jachin"

And he set up the pillars in the porch of the temple: and he set up the right pillar, and called the name thereof Jachin: and he set up the left pillar, and called the name thereof Boaz.

These two pillars most likely were not support structures, but were free-standing, based on similar pillars in other nearby contemporary temples.

=== Verse 23 ===
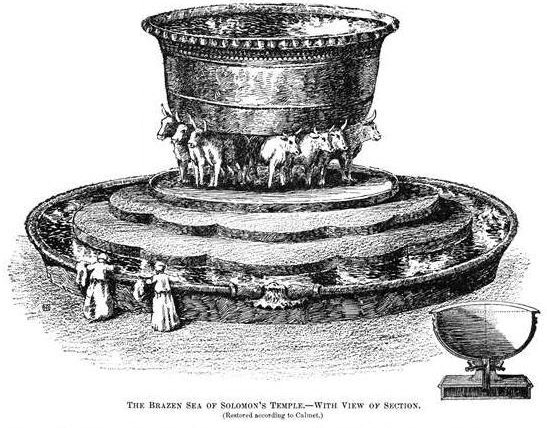
An artist's rendition of the Molten Sea (or Brazen Sea) of Solomon, published in the 1906 Jewish Encyclopedia.

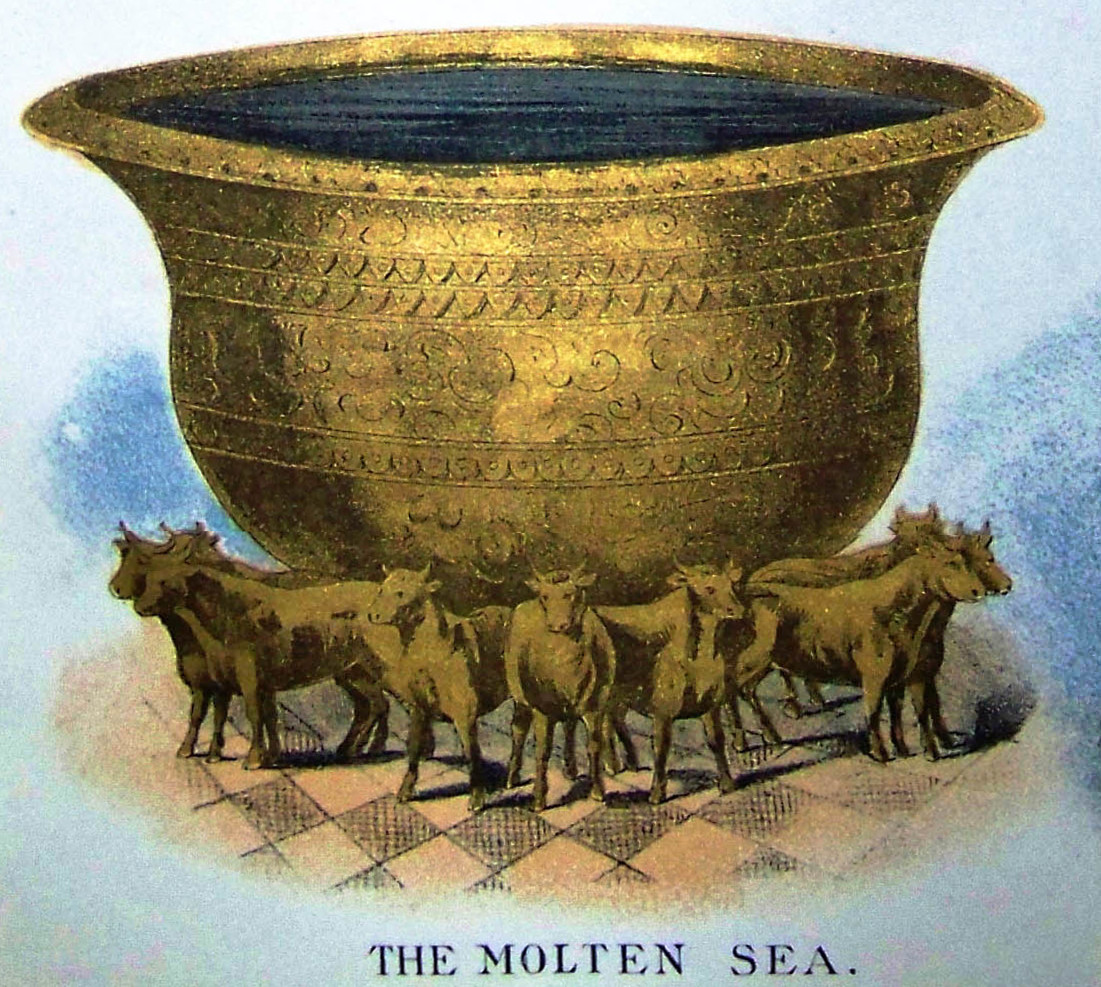
Molten Sea illustration in the Holman Bible, 1890

And he made a molten sea, ten cubits from the one brim to the other: it was round all about, and his height was five cubits: and a line of thirty cubits did compass it round about.

- Cross reference: 2 Chronicles 4:2
- "5 cubits": a length measurement of about 7.5 feet or 2.3 meters.
- "30 cubits": about 45 feet or 14 meters.

The approximation of the mathematical constant "π" ("pi"), defined as the ratio of a circle's circumference to its diameter, can apparently be calculated from this verse as 30 cubits divided by 10 cubits to yield "3". However, Matityahu Hacohen Munk observed that the spelling for "line" in Hebrew, normally written as קו qaw, in 1 Kings 7:23 is written (ketiv) as קוה qaweh. Using gematria, qaweh yields "111" whereas qaw yields "106", so when used in calculation $\frac{30}{10} * \frac {111}{{106}}$ it results in π = "3.1415094", very close to the modern definition of "3.1415926". Charles Ryrie gives another explanation based on 1 Kings 7:26 (cf. 2 Chronicles 4:5) that the molten sea has a brim of a handbreadth (about 4 inches or 10 cm) wide, so when the inside diameter, subtracting 10 cubits (about 180 inches or 4.6 meter; from outer "brim to brim") with 2 times 4 inches (two handbreadth) to yield 172 inches (4.4 meter), is divided by π, it results in 540 inches (45 feet or 14 meter or 30 cubits) which is the circumference given in this verse.

== See also ==
- David
- Israel
- Jerusalem
- Lebanon
- Pharaoh's daughter
- Solomon's Temple
- Sukkot
- Tribe of Naphtali
- Tyre
- Related Bible parts: 2 Samuel 7, 1 Kings 5, 1 Kings 6, 2 Chronicles 3, 2 Chronicles 4

== Sources ==
- Collins, John J. (2014). "Chapter 14: 1 Kings 12 – 2 Kings 25". Introduction to the Hebrew Scriptures. Fortress Press. pp. 277–296. ISBN 978-1451469233.
- Coogan, Michael David (2007). Coogan, Michael David; Brettler, Marc Zvi; Newsom, Carol Ann; Perkins, Pheme (eds.). The New Oxford Annotated Bible with the Apocryphal/Deuterocanonical Books: New Revised Standard Version, Issue 48 (Augmented 3rd ed.). Oxford University Press. ISBN 978-0195288810.
- Dietrich, Walter (2007). "13. 1 and 2 Kings". In Barton, John; Muddiman, John (eds.). The Oxford Bible Commentary (first (paperback) ed.). Oxford University Press. pp. 232–266. ISBN 978-0199277186.
- Fitzmyer, Joseph A. (2008). A Guide to the Dead Sea Scrolls and Related Literature. Grand Rapids, MI: William B. Eerdmans Publishing Company. ISBN 9780802862419.
- Halley, Henry H. (1965). Halley's Bible Handbook: an abbreviated Bible commentary (24th (revised) ed.). Zondervan Publishing House. ISBN 0-310-25720-4.
- Hayes, Christine (2015). Introduction to the Bible. Yale University Press. ISBN 978-0300188271.
- Leithart, Peter J. (2006). 1 & 2 Kings. Brazos Theological Commentary on the Bible. Brazos Press. ISBN 978-1587431258.
- McKane, William (1993). "Kings, Book of". In Metzger, Bruce M; Coogan, Michael D (eds.). The Oxford Companion to the Bible. Oxford University Press. pp. 409–413. ISBN 978-0195046458.
- Metzger, Bruce M; Coogan, Michael D, eds. (1993). The Oxford Companion to the Bible. Oxford University Press. ISBN 978-0195046458.
- Ulrich, Eugene, ed. (2010). The Biblical Qumran Scrolls: Transcriptions and Textual Variants. Brill.
- Würthwein, Ernst (1995). The Text of the Old Testament. Translated by Rhodes, Erroll F. Grand Rapids, MI: Wm. B. Eerdmans. ISBN 0-8028-0788-7.
