= Prayer of Solomon =

Prayer by King Solomon

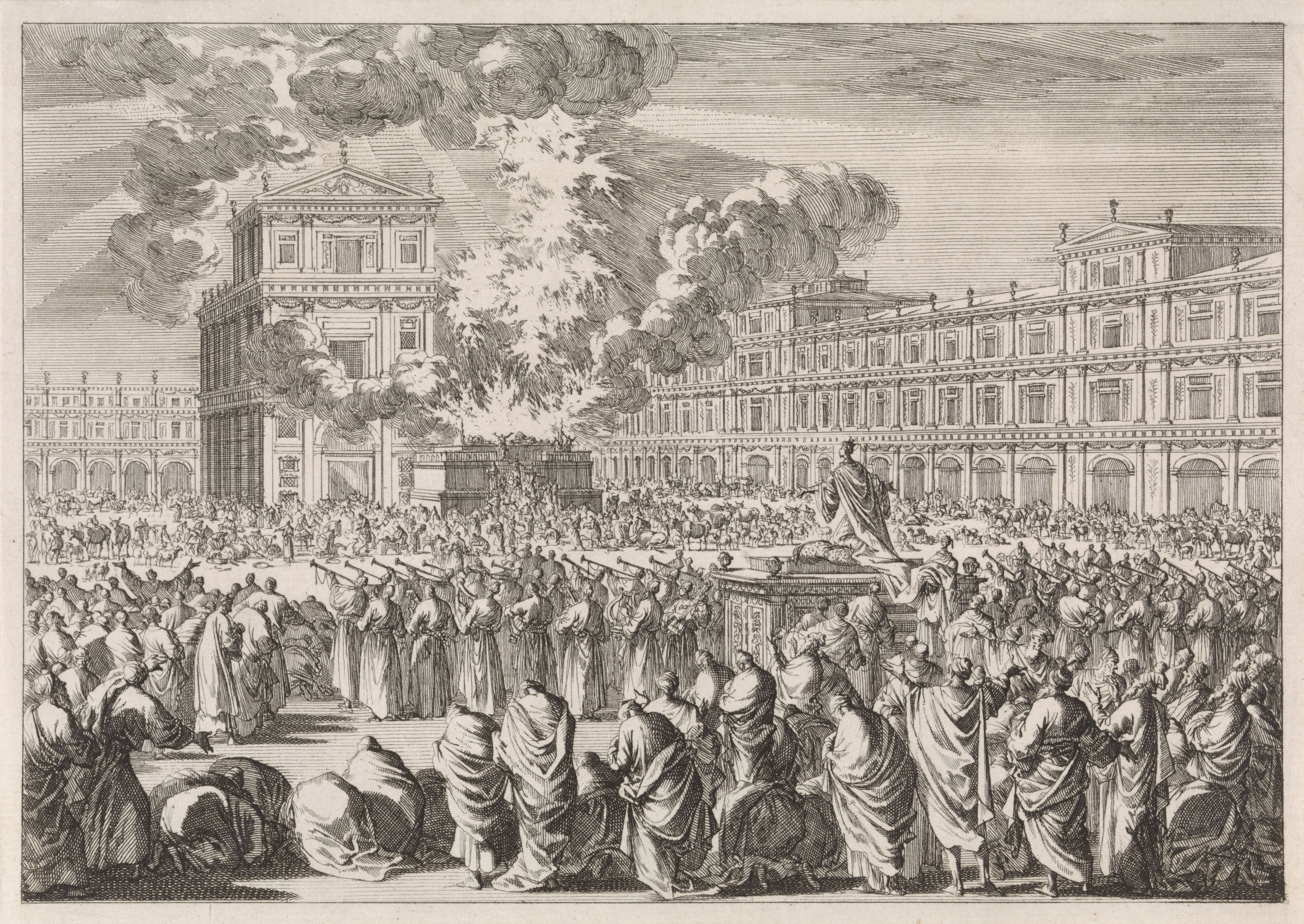
The Dedication of Solomon's Temple, by Jan Luyken (1700)

The Prayer of Solomon is a prayer by King Solomon described in 1 Kings 8:22–53 and 2 Chronicles 6:12–42. This prayer is said to have occurred at the dedication of the temple of Solomon, which also became known as the First Temple. The wording and thinking of the prayer have much in common with the language of Deuteronomy.

== Shorter version in Latin Bibles ==
A shorter version of the prayer of Solomon (1st Kings 8:22–30a) is also found in some Latin Bibles at the end of or immediately following the Book of Sirach (also known as Ecclesiasticus). It sometimes appears as the fifty-second chapter of Sirach or (as in the Gutenberg Bible) as a separate prayer.

== Quotation from the King James Version ==
Yet have thou respect unto the prayer of thy servant, and to his supplication, O Lord my God, to hearken unto the cry and to the prayer, which thy servant prayeth before thee to day:

That thine eyes may be open toward this house night and day, even toward the place of which thou hast said, My name shall be there: that thou mayest hearken unto the prayer which thy servant shall make toward this place. (...)

(...) And it was so, that when Solomon had made an end of praying all this prayer and supplication unto the Lord, he arose from before the altar of the Lord, from kneeling on his knees with his hands spread up to heaven.

— 1st Kings 8:22-54 King James Version
