= 2 Chronicles 3 =

Second Book of Chronicles, chapter 3

- ← chapter 2 chapter 4 →
- The complete Hebrew text of the Books of Chronicles (1st and 2nd Chronicles) in the Leningrad Codex (1008 CE).
- Book: Books of Chronicles
- Category: Ketuvim
- Christian Bible part: Old Testament
- Order in the Christian part: 14

2 Chronicles 3 is the third chapter of the Second Book of Chronicles the Old Testament of the Christian Bible or of the second part of the Books of Chronicles in the Hebrew Bible. The book is compiled from older sources by an unknown person or group, designated by modern scholars as "the Chronicler", and had the final shape established in late fifth or fourth century BC. This chapter belongs to the section focusing on the kingship of Solomon (2 Chronicles 1 to 9). The focus of this chapter is the construction of the temple in Jerusalem.

== Text ==
This chapter was originally written in the Hebrew language and is divided into 17 verses.

=== Textual witnesses ===
Some early manuscripts containing the text of this chapter in Hebrew are of the Masoretic Text, which includes the Aleppo Codex (10th century) and Codex Leningradensis (1008.

There is also a translation into Koine Greek known as the Septuagint, made in the last few centuries BC. Extant ancient manuscripts of the Septuagint version include Codex Vaticanus (B; $\mathfrak{G}$^{B}; 4th century), and Codex Alexandrinus (A; $\mathfrak{G}$^{A}; 5th century). (Note: The whole book of 2 Chronicles is missing from the extant Codex Sinaiticus.)

=== Old Testament references ===
- 2 Chronicles 3:1–4: 1 Kings 6:1–4
- 2 Chronicles 3:5–9: 1 Kings 6:14–22
- 2 Chronicles 3:10–13: 1 Kings 6:23–30
- 2 Chronicles 3:14–17: 1 Kings 7:13–22

== Temple construction begins (3:1–4) ==
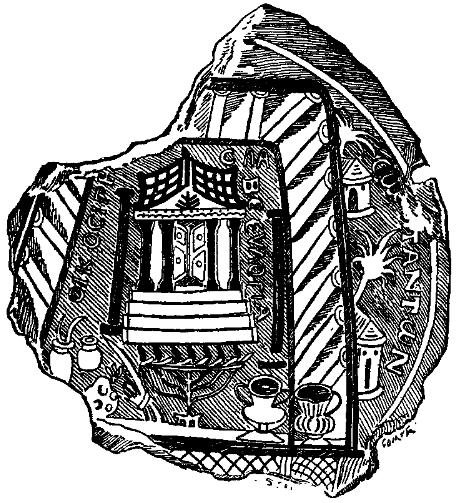
3rd century depiction of the temple on glass bowl

This section records the start of temple construction, a parallel of 1 Kings 6. The structure of the temple was based on the desert tabernacle and linked to Abraham. Whereas the books of Kings contains the calculation of dates and months from the year of Solomon's accession and from the Exodus, the Chronicles focused more on the exact location (Mount Moriah; only appeared one time in Genesis 22:2) and authentication (YHWH appeared to David there, and sent fire from heaven on the altar of burnt offering).

=== Verse 1 ===
So Solomon began to build the house of the Lord in Jerusalem on Mount Moriah, where He appeared to David his father, at the place that David established on the threshing floor of Ornan the Jebusite.

- "Mount Moriah": the site of the binding of Isaac (Genesis 22:2). Also the location where David was instructed to build an altar to God (1 Chronicles 21:18-22:1) after the judgement of his sin for performing census (1 Chronicles 21:1-14).
- "He" according to Masoretic Text and Vulgate, whereas Septuagint has "the Lord" and Targum has "the Angel of the Lord".
- "Ornan": written as "Araunah" in 2 Samuel 24:16ff.

== The temple's interior (3:5–17) ==
Verses 6–7 indicates a mosaic made with precious stones on the floor (cf 1 Chronicles 29:2). The repeated phrase 'he made' emphasizes the similarity to the report in Exodus, portraying the parallels between the temple and the tabernacle. The golden nails in verse 9 parallel with the (differently named) golden nails in Exodus 26:32, 37, although fifty shekels of gold is probably a symbolic number (cf. 2 Samuel 24:24). The Chronicles focuses on the construction material and position of the cherubims (verses 10–13), while omitting the height (mentioned in 1 Kings 6:23). The curtain described in verse 14 (not mentioned in 1 Kings 6, possibly missing from 6:21b) is also mentioned in the writing of Josephus (Jewish War 5.5.5), recalling that of the tabernacle (Exodus 26:31).

=== Verse 9 ===
And the weight of the nails was fifty shekels of gold.
And he overlaid the upper chambers with gold.

- "50 shekels": about 1¼ pounds or 575 grams, as a "shekel" was about 2/5 ounce or 11 grams

== See also ==
- Ark of the Covenant
- Davidic line
- Tabernacle
- Related Bible parts: Exodus 30, Exodus 31, Leviticus 24, Numbers 28, Numbers 29, 2 Samuel 7, 1 Kings 6, 1 Kings 7, 1 Chronicles 16, 1 Chronicles 22, Jonah 1, Ezra 3

== Sources ==
- Ackroyd, Peter R (1993). "Chronicles, Books of". In Metzger, Bruce M; Coogan, Michael D (eds.). The Oxford Companion to the Bible. Oxford University Press. pp. 113–116. ISBN 978-0195046458.
- Bennett, William (2018). The Expositor's Bible: The Books of Chronicles. Litres. ISBN 978-5040825196.
- Coogan, Michael David (2007). Coogan, Michael David; Brettler, Marc Zvi; Newsom, Carol Ann; Perkins, Pheme (eds.). The New Oxford Annotated Bible with the Apocryphal/Deuterocanonical Books: New Revised Standard Version, Issue 48 (Augmented 3rd ed.). Oxford University Press. ISBN 9780195288810.
- Mabie, Frederick (2017). "I. The Chronicler's Genealogical Survey of All Israel". In Longman III, Tremper; Garland, David E (eds.). 1 and 2 Chronicles. The Expositor's Bible Commentary. Zondervan. pp. 267–308. ISBN 978-0310531814.
- Mathys, H. P. (2007). "14. 1 and 2 Chronicles". In Barton, John; Muddiman, John (eds.). The Oxford Bible Commentary (first (paperback) ed.). Oxford University Press. pp. 267–308. ISBN 978-0199277186.
- Würthwein, Ernst (1995). The Text of the Old Testament. Translated by Rhodes, Erroll F. Grand Rapids, MI: William B. Eerdmans. ISBN 0-8028-0788-7.
