= 1 Kings 3 =

1 Kings, chapter 3

- ← chapter 2 chapter 4 →
- The pages containing the Books of Kings (1 & 2 Kings) Leningrad Codex (1008 CE).
- Book: First book of Kings
- Hebrew Bible part: Nevi'im
- Order in the Hebrew part: 4
- Category: Former Prophets
- Christian Bible part: Old Testament
- Order in the Christian part: 11

1 Kings 3 is the third chapter of the Books of Kings in the Hebrew Bible or the First Book of Kings in the Old Testament of the Christian Bible. The book is a compilation of various annals recording the acts of the kings of Israel and Judah by a Deuteronomic compiler in the seventh century BCE, with a supplement added in the sixth century BCE. This chapter belongs to the section focusing on the reign of Solomon over the unified kingdom of Judah and Israel (1 Kings 1 to 11). The focus of this chapter is on the reign of Solomon, the king of Israel.

== Text ==
This chapter was originally written in the Hebrew language and since the 16th century is divided into 28 verses.

=== Textual witnesses ===
Some early manuscripts containing the text of this chapter in Hebrew are of the Masoretic Text tradition, which includes the Codex Cairensis (895), Aleppo Codex (10th century), and Codex Leningradensis (1008). Fragments containing parts of this chapter in Hebrew were found among the Dead Sea Scrolls, that is, 6Q4 (6QpapKgs; 150–75 BCE) with extant verses 12–14.

There is also a translation into Koine Greek known as the Septuagint, made in the last few centuries BCE. Extant ancient manuscripts of the Septuagint version include Codex Vaticanus (B; $\mathfrak{G}$^{B}; 4th century) and Codex Alexandrinus (A; $\mathfrak{G}$^{A}; 5th century). (Note: The whole book of 1 Kings is missing from the extant Codex Sinaiticus.)

=== Old Testament references ===
- 1 Kings 3:1–15: 2 Chronicles 1:1–13; Psalm 45:1–17; Psalm 72:1–20

== Analysis ==
This chapter contains one of the important 'biblical treatments' of wisdom in the practical (or, in this case, also political) context. The first part is dominated with Solomon's request for wisdom, whereas the last part is the demonstration of the wisdom he received from God.

== Solomon's prayer for wisdom (verses 1–15) ==
Early in his reign, Solomon entered a diplomatic marriage with the Egyptian Pharaoh's daughter which played a significant role in the story of Solomon (cf. 1 Kings 7:8; 9:16; 11:1), although Solomon's heir (Rehoboam) was not born of her, but of Solomon's Ammonite wife (1 Kings 14:21). Solomon received a good mark in the early religious assessment, noted that "he loved YHWH" (just as YHWH loved him, 2 Samuel 12:24). One negative note was that there were 'high places' – sacrificial sites on the tops of hills, but this happened because Solomon had not yet built the Temple in Jerusalem, which should later be the only place of worship according to the Torah of Moses (Deuteronomy 12). Solomon also went to a high place in Gibeon (today al-Jib, about 8 km (5.0 mi) north-west of Jerusalem) to offer a great sacrifice to God and stayed overnight there, when God appeared to him to offer him a free wish. Dreams are a legitimate method of discovering God's will in the Hebrew Bible (cf. Genesis 28; 37; 1 Samuel 28:6, 15; Joel 3:1; and Daniel 2) (Note: And also in the New Testament, e.g. in Matthew 2:13) although they could also open to abuse (cf. Jeremiah 23:25–27; Zechariah 10:2, cf. Psalm 73:20).

=== Verse 1 ===
And Solomon made affinity with Pharaoh king of Egypt, and took Pharaoh's daughter, and brought her into the city of David, until he had made an end of building his own house, and the house of the Lord, and the wall of Jerusalem round about.

- "Made affinity": here is not "made "alliance", but literally, "made himself son-in-law".
- "Pharaoh king of Egypt": For the first time since the Exodus, Israel had any connection with Egypt. Pharaoh Shishak received Jeroboam I when he fled from Solomon (1 Kings 11:40), so the wife of Solomon must have been a daughter of a pharaoh in the previous dynasty. This daughter of Pharaoh apparently embraced Judaism, so that there was no reproach against her marriage to Solomon, since no Egyptian deity was mentioned among those for whom Solomon built high places at a later time (1 Kings 11:1–8) when 'strange women turned away his heart after other gods'.

=== Verse 7 ===
And now, O LORD my God, you have made your servant king in place of David my father, although I am but a little child. I do not know how to go out or come in.

To "go out and come in" frequently refers to "the manner of leading one's life, and engaging in one's proper duties". Moses, in old age (in Deuteronomy 31:2), was "no longer able to go out and come in".

== Solomon's judgement (verses 16–28) ==
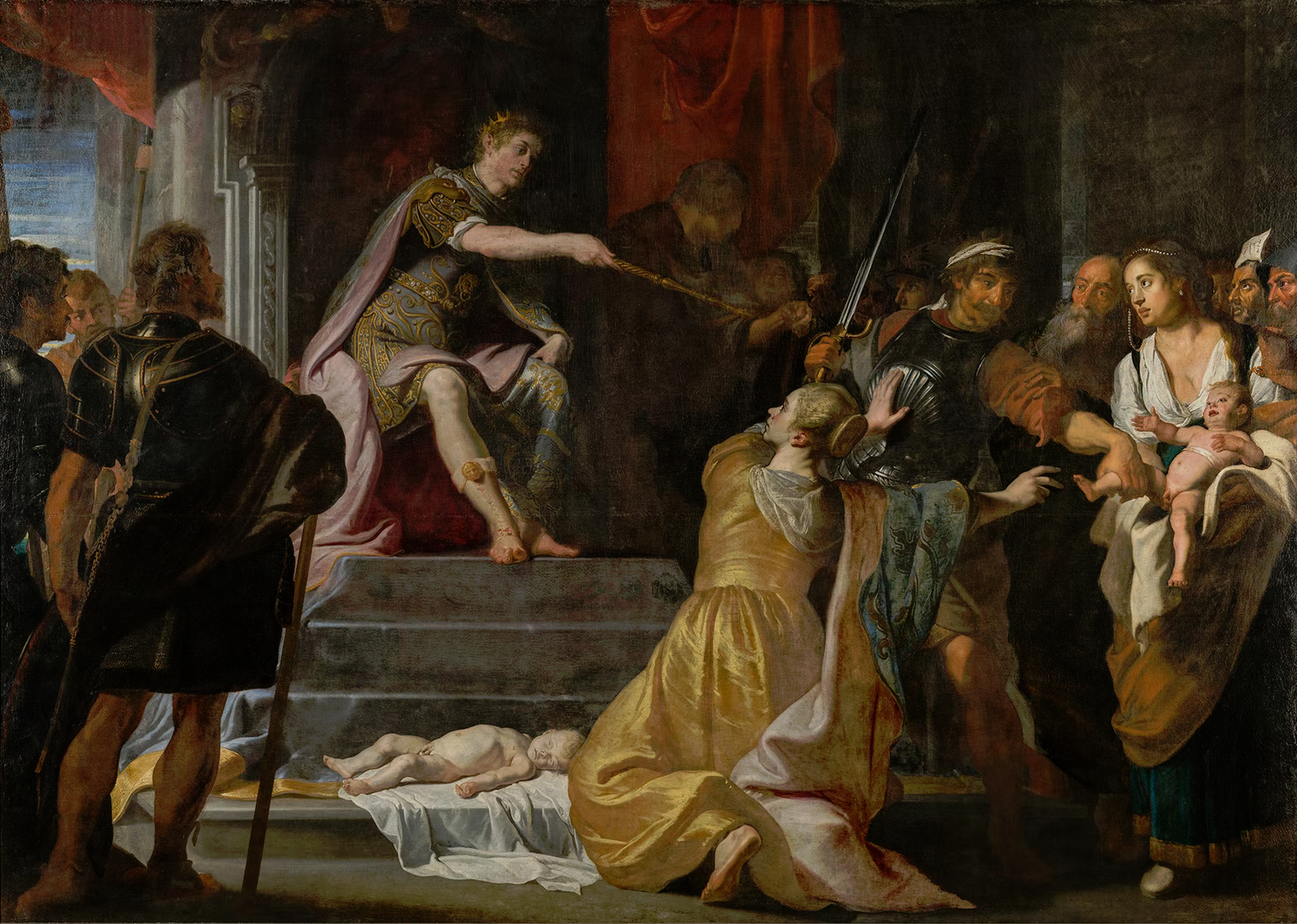
The Judgement of Solomon by Gaspar de Crayer, c. 1620

This section records one episode of Solomon putting to effect the wisdom granted to him in giving an 'unusually clever court judgement' when he was confronted with a seemingly insoluble problem: 'claim against counter-claim without witnesses or evidence'. It was the maternal love—in itself not a legally relevant factor—that supplied 'the key to truth and justice'. The wisdom of Solomon in the administration of justice is an important royal function (cf. 2 Samuel 8:15; 15:2–6). The story of Solomon's judgment is similar in certain aspects to the events in 1 Kings 1–2, as shown in the table below:

1 Kings 1–2	1 Kings 3:16–28
Two mothers: Hagith and Bathsheba	Two mothers
Two sons: Adonijah and Solomon	Two sons
Adonijah died	One son died
Solomon rescued from threat	The other son rescued from threat
David passed judgment in favor of Bathsheba	Solomon passed judgment

== See also ==
- David
- Egypt
- Ark of the Covenant
- Israel
- Jerusalem
- Korban
- Prostitution
- Slaughter offering
- Related Bible parts: 2 Chronicles 1, Psalm 5, Psalm 45, Psalm 72

== Sources ==
- Collins, John J. (2014). "Chapter 14: 1 Kings 12 – 2 Kings 25". Introduction to the Hebrew Scriptures. Fortress Press. pp. 277–296. ISBN 978-1451469233.
- Coogan, Michael David (2007). Coogan, Michael David; Brettler, Marc Zvi; Newsom, Carol Ann; Perkins, Pheme (eds.). The New Oxford Annotated Bible with the Apocryphal/Deuterocanonical Books: New Revised Standard Version, Issue 48 (Augmented 3rd ed.). Oxford University Press. ISBN 978-0195288810.
- Dietrich, Walter (2007). "13. 1 and 2 Kings". In Barton, John; Muddiman, John (eds.). The Oxford Bible Commentary (first (paperback) ed.). Oxford University Press. pp. 232–266. ISBN 978-0199277186.
- Fitzmyer, Joseph A. (2008). A Guide to the Dead Sea Scrolls and Related Literature. Grand Rapids, MI: William B. Eerdmans Publishing Company. ISBN 9780802862419.
- Halley, Henry H. (1965). Halley's Bible Handbook: an abbreviated Bible commentary (24th (revised) ed.). Zondervan Publishing House. ISBN 0-310-25720-4.
- Hayes, Christine (2015). Introduction to the Bible. Yale University Press. ISBN 978-0300188271.
- Leithart, Peter J. (2006). 1 & 2 Kings. Brazos Theological Commentary on the Bible. Brazos Press. ISBN 978-1587431258.
- McKane, William (1993). "Kings, Book of". In Metzger, Bruce M; Coogan, Michael D (eds.). The Oxford Companion to the Bible. Oxford University Press. pp. 409–413. ISBN 978-0195046458.
- Metzger, Bruce M; Coogan, Michael D, eds. (1993). The Oxford Companion to the Bible. Oxford University Press. ISBN 978-0195046458.
- Ulrich, Eugene, ed. (2010). The Biblical Qumran Scrolls: Transcriptions and Textual Variants. Brill.
- Würthwein, Ernst (1995). The Text of the Old Testament. Translated by Rhodes, Erroll F. Grand Rapids, MI: Wm. B. Eerdmans. ISBN 0-8028-0788-7.
