= 1 Kings 5 =

1 Kings, chapter 5

- ← chapter 4 chapter 6 →
- The pages containing the Books of Kings (1 & 2 Kings) Leningrad Codex (1008 CE).
- Book: First book of Kings
- Hebrew Bible part: Nevi'im
- Order in the Hebrew part: 4
- Category: Former Prophets
- Christian Bible part: Old Testament
- Order in the Christian part: 11

1 Kings 5 is the fifth chapter of the Books of Kings in the Hebrew Bible or the First Book of Kings in the Old Testament of the Christian Bible. The book is a compilation of various annals recording the acts of the kings of Israel and Judah by a Deuteronomic compiler in the seventh century BCE, with a supplement added in the sixth century BCE. This chapter belongs to the section focusing on the reign of Solomon over the unified kingdom of Judah and Israel (1 Kings 1 to 11). The focus of this chapter is the reign of Solomon, the king of Israel.

== Text ==
This chapter was originally written in the Hebrew language and since the 16th century is divided into 18 verses.

=== Textual witnesses ===
Some early manuscripts containing the text of this chapter in Hebrew are of the Masoretic Text tradition, which includes the Codex Cairensis (895), Aleppo Codex (10th century), and Codex Leningradensis (1008).

There is also a translation into Koine Greek known as the Septuagint, made in the last few centuries BCE. Extant ancient manuscripts of the Septuagint version include Codex Vaticanus (B; $\mathfrak{G}$^{B}; 4th century) and Codex Alexandrinus (A; $\mathfrak{G}$^{A}; 5th century). (Note: The whole book of 1 Kings is missing from the extant Codex Sinaiticus.)

=== Old Testament references ===
- 1 Kings 5:1–6: 2 Chronicles 2:1–10
- 1 Kings 5:7–12: 2 Chronicles 2:11–18

== Analysis ==
The first 12 verses of this chapter continue the section of 1 Kings 4:29–34 to form a chiasm:

A Solomon's wisdom (4:29–34)

B Hiram sends servants to Solomon (5:1)

C Solomon's message to Hiram (5:2–6)

B' Hiram's response to Solomon (5:7–11)

A' Solomon's wisdom (5:12)

== Solomon's contract with Hiram of Tyre (5:1–12) ==
Israel at the time of David was a lowly developed agrarian country, so Solomon needed foreign help for his building projects, as the rest that eluded his father was finally achieved (2 Samuel 7:1, 10–13). The Phoenicians were suitable partners because of their world-wide trading connections, high cultural standards, and the source of large timber in the mountains of Lebanon. Solomon ordered timber shipments and offered compensation not only for the materials but also for labor. Hiram I's price is the delivery of a large quantity of wheat and oil from Israel. The discussion between the two kings included the notes of the Davidic covenant and the clarification of why Solomon, not David before him, is the one who built the temple.

=== Verse 1 ===
Now Hiram king of Tyre sent his servants to Solomon, because he heard that they had anointed him king in place of his father, for Hiram had always loved David.

- "Hiram" (Phoenician: 'ahiram): king of the important city of Tyre, was an ally of David (2 Samuel 5:11) and the first to take up relations with Solomon. Josephus, citing both Tyrian court records and the writings of Menander, wrote that Hiram lived for 53 years and reigned 34. His regnal years have been calculated from 980 to 947 BCE, in succession to his father, Abibaal, and Hiram was later succeeded as king of Tyre by his son Baal-Eser I.

== Forced labor in Israel (5:13–18) ==
The massive availability of forced labor from 'all Israel' (cf. 1 Kings 9:20–23) would later be the cause of the kingdom's partition (1 Kings 12). The Israelite task force sent to Lebanon consisted of 'conscripted workers' from the Canaanite population and 150,000 people of Israel (cf. 1 Kings 4:6).

=== Verse 18 ===
So Solomon’s builders, Hiram’s builders, and the Gebalites quarried them; and they prepared timber and stones to build the temple.

- "Gebalites" ("the stonesquarers" in KJV): people from Byblos (on the coast to the north of Tyre in today's northern Lebanon).
- "Temple": literally "house"

== See also ==
- Israel
- Jerusalem
- Sidon
- Solomon's Temple
- Related Bible parts: 2 Samuel 5, 1 Kings 4, 2 Chronicles 2

== Sources ==
- Collins, John J. (2014). "Chapter 14: 1 Kings 12 – 2 Kings 25". Introduction to the Hebrew Scriptures. Fortress Press. pp. 277–296. ISBN 978-1451469233.
- Coogan, Michael David (2007). Coogan, Michael David; Brettler, Marc Zvi; Newsom, Carol Ann; Perkins, Pheme (eds.). The New Oxford Annotated Bible with the Apocryphal/Deuterocanonical Books: New Revised Standard Version, Issue 48 (Augmented 3rd ed.). Oxford University Press. ISBN 978-0195288810.
- Dietrich, Walter (2007). "13. 1 and 2 Kings". In Barton, John; Muddiman, John (eds.). The Oxford Bible Commentary (first (paperback) ed.). Oxford University Press. pp. 232–266. ISBN 978-0199277186.
- Halley, Henry H. (1965). Halley's Bible Handbook: an abbreviated Bible commentary (24th (revised) ed.). Zondervan Publishing House. ISBN 0-310-25720-4.
- Hayes, Christine (2015). Introduction to the Bible. Yale University Press. ISBN 978-0300188271.
- Leithart, Peter J. (2006). 1 & 2 Kings. Brazos Theological Commentary on the Bible. Brazos Press. ISBN 978-1587431258.
- McKane, William (1993). "Kings, Book of". In Metzger, Bruce M; Coogan, Michael D (eds.). The Oxford Companion to the Bible. Oxford University Press. pp. 409–413. ISBN 978-0195046458.
- Metzger, Bruce M; Coogan, Michael D, eds. (1993). The Oxford Companion to the Bible. Oxford University Press. ISBN 978-0195046458.
- Würthwein, Ernst (1995). The Text of the Old Testament. Translated by Rhodes, Erroll F. Grand Rapids, MI: Wm. B. Eerdmans. ISBN 0-8028-0788-7.
