= 1 Kings 11 =

1 Kings, chapter 11

- ← chapter 10 chapter 12 →
- The pages containing the Books of Kings (1 & 2 Kings) Leningrad Codex (1008 CE).
- Book: First book of Kings
- Hebrew Bible part: Nevi'im
- Order in the Hebrew part: 4
- Category: Former Prophets
- Christian Bible part: Old Testament
- Order in the Christian part: 11

1 Kings 11 is the eleventh chapter of the Books of Kings in the Hebrew Bible or the First Book of Kings in the Old Testament of the Christian Bible. The book is a compilation of various annals recording the acts of the kings of Israel and Judah by a Deuteronomic compiler in the seventh century BCE, with a supplement added in the sixth century BCE. This chapter belongs to the section focusing on the reign of Solomon over the unified kingdom of Judah and Israel (1 Kings 1 to 11). The focus of this chapter is Solomon's decline and death.

== Text ==
This chapter was originally written in the Hebrew language and since the 16th century is divided into 43 verses.

=== Textual witnesses ===
Some early manuscripts containing the text of this chapter in Hebrew are of the Masoretic Text tradition, which includes the Codex Cairensis (895), Aleppo Codex (10th century), and Codex Leningradensis (1008).

There is also a translation into Koine Greek known as the Septuagint, made in the last few centuries BCE. Extant ancient manuscripts of the Septuagint version include Codex Vaticanus (B; $\mathfrak{G}$^{B}; 4th century) and Codex Alexandrinus (A; $\mathfrak{G}$^{A}; 5th century). (Note: The whole book of 1 Kings is missing from the extant Codex Sinaiticus.)

=== Old Testament references ===
- 1 Kings 11:41–43: 2 Chronicles 9:29–31

== Solomon's wives and their Idolatry (11:1–8) ==
Solomon marrying many wives might not be considered unethical at that time, especially for diplomatic reasons, but it should be intolerable in light of the Torah (cf. Deuteronomy 17:17). The passage focuses on religious rather than moral arguments for the foreign wives in a tone similar to post-exilic texts (Ezra 10; Nehemiah 10) viewing them as a temptation threatening loyalty to the God of Israel. Solomon gave his wives something similar to minority rights and religious freedom in modern terms, but he went too far that he committed a grave sin against Yahweh, leading to dire consequences.

== A Divine Manifestation (11:9–13) ==
Because Solomon had "turned away from the Lord", thereby he had broken the first commandment, he faced a consequence of losing power, but in recognition of David's merits, the punishment was delayed and his successor would be left with a smaller kingdom.

=== Verse 13 ===
However, I will not tear away all the kingdom, but I will give one tribe to your son, for the sake of David my servant and for the sake of Jerusalem that I have chosen.

- "Give one tribe": that is "the tribe of Judah", which later became the name of the southern kingdom. However, the tribe of Benjamin can also be counted here due to its close union with the tribe of Judah and their shared property of Jerusalem (as well as the Temple), because the city was of the Jebusite, later conquered by David, but all the ground north of the valley of Hinnom was actually in the tribe of Benjamin. The prophet Ahijah used the same form of words (1 Kings 11:32) when speaking to Jeroboam, after expressly tore his new garment into twelve parts and gave ten of them to Jeroboam.

== The adversaries of Solomon (11:14–40) ==
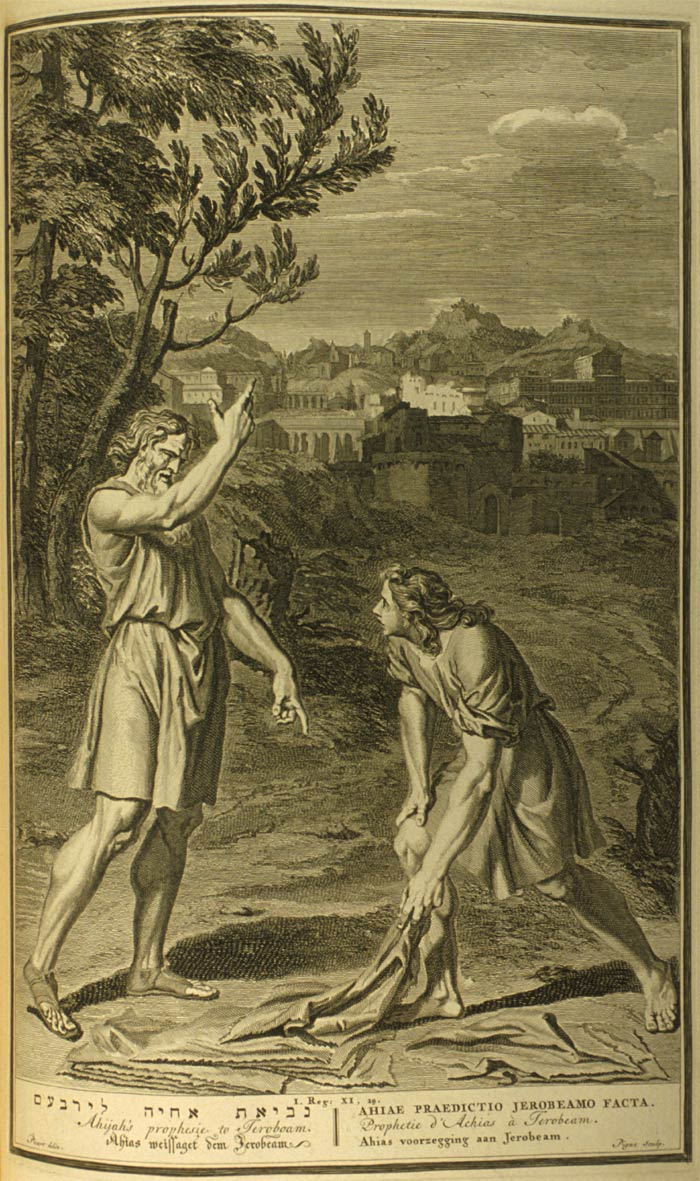
Gerard Hoet, Ahijah's prophecy to Jeroboam, 1728.

Solomon's disloyalty to God resulted in the emergence of 'adversary' (Hebrew: satan) to his reign, in form of three different persons: Hadad, an Edomite prince (verses 14–22), Rezon the son of Eliada of Damascus (verses 23–25), and Jeroboam ben Nebat (verses 26–40). The passage clearly states that God was the initiator of these adversaries (verses 14, 23, also 29–33). The brief biography of each adversary presented in the passage has similarities with the earlier history of Israel.

The life of Hadad, the Edomite prince, echoes the history of the migration of Jacob's family to Egypt and the Exodus:

Event	Hadad	Jacob's family
moving to Egypt	due to Israel's occupation of Edom by David and Joab (11:14–15)	due to famine
kind treatment of Pharaoh	given a house, bread and land (11:18)	given the fertile land of Goshen
married into royal family	given the sister of the queen as wife (11:19)	Joseph was given the daughter of high priest as wife
son among Pharaoh's children	Genubath (11:20)	Moses
out of Egypt	sought to return (11:21–22)	Exodus under Moses

Hadad stated his desire to return to Edom using 'exodus language': "send me out" (based on the same Hebrew verb: shalakh).

The biography of Rezon the son of Eliada of Damascus (11:23–25) also has a parallel with the history of David, the king of Israel.

Event	Rezon	David
flee from his master	from Hadadezer (11:23)	from Saul
gather a band	becoming a leader of a guerilla force (11:24)	becoming a leader of disaffected people in the wilderness
becoming king	rising to the throne in Damascus, Syria (11:25)	anointed to the throne in Hebron and then Jerusalem

Jeroboam ben Nebat, Solomon's third adversary, arose from within northern Israel, tellingly from among the forced laborers in Ephraim. The parallels of his biography with the life of David are as follows:

Event	Jeroboam	David
valiant warrior	potentially a royal figure (11:28)	winning battles against the Philistines
in early life faithfully served his master	serving Solomon (11:28)	serving Saul
prophesied by a prophet	meet the prophet Ahijah of Shiloh (11:29–39)	anointed by the prophet Samuel who grew up with the priest Eli in Shiloh
torn cloak	Ahijah tore his cloak and gave to Jeroboam (11:30)	Saul tore Samuel's cloak (1 Samuel 15:27)
threatened as successor	Solomon sought to kill Jeroboam (11:40)	Saul sought to kill David
promises of God	to Jeroboam (11:38–39)	to David

Ahijah of Shiloh is shown as Jeroboam's supporter in this passage, but he will be Jeroboam's enemy in 1 Kings 14:1-18.

== Death of Solomon (11:41–43) ==
This is the first use regular concluding formula in the books of Kings. The Chronicler mentioned 'the Book of the Acts of Solomon' as a source of information, presumably in form of royal annals.

=== Verse 42 ===
And the time that Solomon reigned in Jerusalem over all Israel was forty years.

- "Forty years": according to Thiele's chronology, the reign of Solomon began when David died between September 972 BCE and September 971 BCE, until Solomon's death between September 931 BCE and April 930 BCE.

== Archaeological proofs ==
In July 2024, the Israel Antiquities Authority and Tel Aviv University announced the discovery of a moat that split the City of David in half, separating the palace and Temple Mount from the rest of the city. It was at least nine meters deep and 30 meters wide, and extended across at least 70 meters, from west to east. The discovery resembles the hole in the wall described in 1 Kings 11:27.

== See also ==
- Acts of Solomon
- Ammonite
- Astarte
- Chemosh
- Concubine
- Damascus
- David
- Desert of Paran
- Egypt
- Hittites
- Idolatry
- Israel
- Jerusalem
- Moab
- Midian
- Milcom
- Moloch
- Polygamy
- Solomon's Temple
- Syria
- Zobah
- Related Bible parts: Deuteronomy 17, 1 Samuel 15, 2 Samuel 7, 2 Samuel 8, 1 Kings 5, 1 Kings 6, 1 Kings 7, 1 Kings 9, 2 Chronicles 2, 2 Chronicles 9, Ezra 10, Nehemiah 10

== Sources ==
- Collins, John J. (2014). "Chapter 14: 1 Kings 12 – 2 Kings 25". Introduction to the Hebrew Scriptures. Fortress Press. pp. 277–296. ISBN 978-1451469233.
- Coogan, Michael David (2007). Coogan, Michael David; Brettler, Marc Zvi; Newsom, Carol Ann; Perkins, Pheme (eds.). The New Oxford Annotated Bible with the Apocryphal/Deuterocanonical Books: New Revised Standard Version, Issue 48 (Augmented 3rd ed.). Oxford University Press. ISBN 978-0195288810.
- Dietrich, Walter (2007). "13. 1 and 2 Kings". In Barton, John; Muddiman, John (eds.). The Oxford Bible Commentary (first (paperback) ed.). Oxford University Press. pp. 232–266. ISBN 978-0199277186.
- Halley, Henry H. (1965). Halley's Bible Handbook: an abbreviated Bible commentary (24th (revised) ed.). Zondervan Publishing House. ISBN 0-310-25720-4.
- Hayes, Christine (2015). Introduction to the Bible. Yale University Press. ISBN 978-0300188271.
- Leithart, Peter J. (2006). 1 & 2 Kings. Brazos Theological Commentary on the Bible. Brazos Press. ISBN 978-1587431258.
- McFall, Leslie (1991), "Translation Guide to the Chronological Data in Kings and Chronicles" (PDF), Bibliotheca Sacra, 148: 3-45, archived from the original (PDF) on 2003-08-07
- McKane, William (1993). "Kings, Book of". In Metzger, Bruce M; Coogan, Michael D (eds.). The Oxford Companion to the Bible. Oxford University Press. pp. 409–413. ISBN 978-0195046458.
- Metzger, Bruce M; Coogan, Michael D, eds. (1993). The Oxford Companion to the Bible. Oxford University Press. ISBN 978-0195046458.
- Thiele, Edwin R. (1983). The Mysterious Numbers of the Hebrew Kings (3rd ed.). Grand Rapids, Michigan: Zondervan. ISBN 978-0-310-36010-0.
- Würthwein, Ernst (1995). The Text of the Old Testament. Translated by Rhodes, Erroll F. Grand Rapids, MI: Wm. B. Eerdmans. ISBN 0-8028-0788-7.
