= 1 Chronicles 16 =

First Book of Chronicles, chapter 16

- ← chapter 15 chapter 17 →
- The complete Hebrew text of the Books of Chronicles (1 and 2 Chronicles) in the Leningrad Codex (1008 CE).
- Book: Books of Chronicles
- Category: Ketuvim
- Christian Bible part: Old Testament
- Order in the Christian part: 13

1 Chronicles 16 is the sixteenth chapter of the Books of Chronicles in the Hebrew Bible or the First Book of Chronicles in the Old Testament of the Christian Bible. The book is compiled from older sources by an unknown person or group, designated by modern scholars as "the Chronicler", and had the final shape established in late fifth or fourth century BCE. This chapter describes the last act of transporting the Ark of the Covenant into the City of David in Jerusalem and the great religious festival for the occasion. The whole chapter belongs to the section focusing on the kingship of David (1 Chronicles 9:35 to 29:30).

== Text ==
This chapter was originally written in the Hebrew language. It is divided into 43 verses.

=== Textual witnesses ===
Some early manuscripts containing the text of this chapter in Hebrew are of the Masoretic Text tradition, which includes the Aleppo Codex (10th century), and Codex Leningradensis (1008).

There is also a translation into Koine Greek known as the Septuagint, made in the last few centuries BCE. Extant ancient manuscripts of the Septuagint version include Codex Vaticanus (B; $\mathfrak{G}$^{B}; 4th century), Codex Sinaiticus (S; BHK: $\mathfrak{G}$^{S}; 4th century), Codex Alexandrinus (A; $\mathfrak{G}$^{A}; 5th century) and Codex Marchalianus (Q; $\mathfrak{G}$^{Q}; 6th century).

=== Old Testament references ===
- 1 Chronicles 16:1–6: 2 Samuel 6:17–19.
- 1 Chronicles 16:7–22: Psalm 105:1–15.
- 1 Chronicles 16:23–36: Psalm 96:1–13.

== The Ark placed in a tent (16:1–6) ==
Verses 1–3 in this section closely resemble 2 Samuel 6:17–19 and here serve as an introduction of the festival to praise and thank God (cf. 2 Chronicles 20:26, 28; 29:30; 30:21, 27). After David successfully arranged to place the Ark inside the specially prepared tent, he designates certain Levites and priests to lead the musical service (verses 4–6; cf. 1 Chronicles 16:37).

=== Verse 6 ===
and Benaiah and Jahaziel the priests were to blow trumpets regularly before the ark of the covenant of God.

- "Benaiah and Jahaziel": In 1 Chronicles 15:24 Benaiah is coupled as priests with Eliezer.
- "Trumpets" (Hebrew plural: חֲצֹצְר֣וֹת, khă-tsō-tsə-rōṯ) are the instruments reserved for the priests, especially the "Shofar" ("horn") which was used in earlier times, and there must be two trumpet-playing priests according to Numbers 10:2, as YHWH ordered Moses to produce two silver trumpets.

although the term can also be used for secular trumpets for music service (cf. verse 42).

- "Regularly" (Hebrew: תָּמִ֔יד, tā-mîḏ) or "continually" (KJV) is a specific term denoting "at fixed and regularly recurring services."

== David’s Psalm of Thanksgiving (16:7–36) ==
The festive psalm that David instructed the Levites to sing are a medley composed of parts (with variations) from some known psalms. At this time, there could have existed some form of the Book of Psalms as a 'liturgical collection' which may already have been 'attributed to David'. The composition initially looks back at the history of events up to that point (verses 8–22; Psalm 105:1–15), then praising YHWH (verses 23–33; Psalm 96), and finally asking for deliverance from enemies (verses 34–36; Psalm 106:1, 47–48). The Chronicler copies seven (w. 8, 20, 24, 26, 28, 31, 35, cf. also 'all the earth', v. 30) foreign nations to show the greatness of YHWH (in contrast to other gods).

=== Verse 36 ===
Blessed be the Lord God of Israel for ever and ever.

And all the people said, Amen, and praised the Lord.

- "For ever and ever": or “from everlasting to everlasting", translated from Hebrew phrase מן־העולם ועד העלם, min-hā-‘ōw--lām wə- m‘aḏin hā-‘ō-lām.
- "Amen": the Hebrew term אָמֵן meaning "surely"; traditionally written in the transliterated form.

== David appoints worship leaders (16:37–43) ==
David appointed worship leaders to minister the Ark of the Covenant in Jerusalem, and also for the tabernacle at Gibeon (verses 39–42). Although the regular ceremony in Gibeon was not mentioned in other parts of Hebrew Bible, its historical authenticity is supported by the confirmation of its existence in 1 Kings 3:3–4. Here is mentioned the first time that the ark and the tabernacle were in two separate places, although the ordinary sacrifices and services, "all that is written in the Law of the Lord" (verse 40; cf. Exodus 29:38-39; Numbers 28:3-4) were carefully observed on the original altar (Exodus 38:2) in the tabernacle, whereas other and special sacrifices evidently were offered in the presence of the ark. The tabernacle constructed in the wilderness was first stationed at Shiloh (Joshua 18:1; 1 Samuel 4:3, 4), then removed to Nob (1 Samuel 21:1; 1 Samuel 22:19) until the slaughter of the priests there by Doeg the Edomite at Saul's command, before this passage informs its location in Gibeon (cf. 1 Chronicles 21:29; 2 Chronicles 1:3). The uninterrupted and legitimate (sacrificial) services were portrayed in the Chronicles as spanning the entire period from the wilderness era, including the positioning of the tabernacle at Gibeon (underlined by its priests, musicians, and gatekeepers), until Solomon established the temple in Jerusalem.

== See also ==
- Ark of the Covenant
- Jerusalem
- Solomon
- Tabernacle
- Related Bible parts: Exodus 29, Numbers 28, 1 Chronicles 21, 2 Chronicles 2, 2 Chronicles 3, Psalm 96, Psalm 105, Psalm 106

== Sources ==
- Ackroyd, Peter R (1993). "Chronicles, Books of". In Metzger, Bruce M; Coogan, Michael D (eds.). The Oxford Companion to the Bible. Oxford University Press. pp. 113–116. ISBN 978-0195046458.
- Bennett, William (2018). The Expositor's Bible: The Books of Chronicles. Litres. ISBN 978-5040825196.
- Coogan, Michael David (2007). Coogan, Michael David; Brettler, Marc Zvi; Newsom, Carol Ann; Perkins, Pheme (eds.). The New Oxford Annotated Bible with the Apocryphal/Deuterocanonical Books: New Revised Standard Version, Issue 48 (Augmented 3rd ed.). Oxford University Press. ISBN 9780195288810.
- Endres, John C. (2012). First and Second Chronicles. Liturgical Press. ISBN 9780814628447.
- Gilbert, Henry L (1897). "The Forms of the Names in 1 Chronicles 1-7 Compared with Those in Parallel Passages of the Old Testament". The American Journal of Semitic Languages and Literatures. 13 (4). Liturgical Press: 279–298. doi:10.1086/369250. JSTOR 527992.
- Hill, Andrew E. (2003). First and Second Chronicles. Zondervan. ISBN 9780310206101.
- Mabie, Frederick (2017). "I. The Chronicler's Genealogical Survey of All Israel". In Longman III, Tremper; Garland, David E (eds.). 1 and 2 Chronicles. The Expositor's Bible Commentary. Zondervan. pp. 267–308. ISBN 978-0310531814.
- Mathys, H. P. (2007). "14. 1 and 2 Chronicles". In Barton, John; Muddiman, John (eds.). The Oxford Bible Commentary (first (paperback) ed.). Oxford University Press. pp. 267–308. ISBN 978-0199277186.
- Tuell, Steven S. (2012). First and Second Chronicles. Westminster John Knox Press. ISBN 978-0664238650.
- Würthwein, Ernst (1995). The Text of the Old Testament. Translated by Rhodes, Erroll F. Grand Rapids, MI: William B. Eerdmans. ISBN 0-8028-0788-7.
