= 2 Chronicles 2 =

Second Book of Chronicles, chapter 2

- ← chapter 1 chapter 3 →
- The complete Hebrew text of the Books of Chronicles (1st and 2nd Chronicles) in the Leningrad Codex (1008 CE).
- Book: Books of Chronicles
- Category: Ketuvim
- Christian Bible part: Old Testament
- Order in the Christian part: 14

2 Chronicles 2 is the second chapter of the Second Book of Chronicles the Old Testament of the Christian Bible or of the second part of the Books of Chronicles in the Hebrew Bible. The book is compiled from older sources by an unknown person or group, designated by modern scholars as "the Chronicler", and had the final shape established in late fifth or fourth century BCE. This chapter belongs to the section focusing on the kingship of Solomon (2 Chronicles 1 to 9). The focus of this chapter is Solomon's ascension and wealth.

== Text ==
This chapter was originally written in the Hebrew language and is divided into 18 verses in Christian Bibles, but into 17 verses in the Hebrew Bible with the following verse numbering comparison:

Verse numbering for 2 Chronicles 1 and 2
English	Hebrew
1:1-17	1:1-17
2:1	1:18
2:2-18	2:1-17

This article generally follows the common numbering in Christian English Bible versions, with notes to the numbering in Hebrew Bible versions.

=== Textual witnesses ===
Some early manuscripts containing the text of this chapter in Hebrew are of the Masoretic Text, which includes the Aleppo Codex (10th century) and Codex Leningradensis (1008).

There is also a translation into Koine Greek known as the Septuagint, made in the last few centuries BCE. Extant ancient manuscripts of the Septuagint version include Codex Vaticanus (B; $\mathfrak{G}$^{B}; 4th century), and Codex Alexandrinus (A; $\mathfrak{G}$^{A}; 5th century). (Note: The whole book of 2 Chronicles is missing from the extant Codex Sinaiticus.)

=== Old Testament references ===
- 2 Chronicles 2:1–10: 1 Kings 5:1–6
- 2 Chronicles 2:11–18: 1 Kings 5:7–12

== Solomon gathers building materials for the Temple (2:1–10) ==
The section records Solomon's request to Huram (or "Hiram" in 1 Kings) the king of Tyre, who was a friend of David (verses 2–9), in which the skilfully structured message actually contains temple worship theology, establishing the temple as the second tabernacle (verse 3) with rituals as stated in the Torah (verses 4–5; cf. Exodus 30:1-8; Leviticus 24:5-9; Numbers 28-29 etc.) as the ground for the dedicatory prayer in 2 Chronicles 6:18. The man sent by Huram should be skilled in carpentry, as well as other crafts and works with various materials (verse 6; for examples, the curtain in 2 Chronicles 3:14), basically an equivalent of Bezalel and his assistant Oholiab, who constructed the tabernacle at Mount Sinai (Exodus 31:18). Solomon worked together with the Phoenicians in parallel with what David did (2 Samuel 5:11; 1 Chronicles 22:4).

=== Verse 4 ===
Behold, I am building a temple for the name of the Lord my God, to dedicate it to Him, to burn before Him sweet incense, for the continual showbread, for the burnt offerings morning and evening, on the Sabbaths, on the New Moons, and on the set feasts of the Lord our God. This is an ordinance forever to Israel.

- "Sweet incense": literally "incense of spices"
- "Set feasts": or "appointed feasts"

== Huram's reply to Solomon (1:11–18) ==
The salutation 'my lord' in verse 14 indicates Solomon's supremacy over Huram. Joppa (verse 15) was an important Israelite seaport (cf. Jonah 1:3; Ezra 3:7 about trading relations with the Phoenicians (Sidon and Tyre), mentioning Lebanese wood being transported across the sea to Joppa). According to 1 Kings 9:22 (cf. 2 Chronicles 5:29), Israelites were not employed as forced laborers, but the foreigners were (the same as in the time of David (1 Chronicles 22:2)

== See also ==
- Ark of the Covenant
- Davidic line
- Tabernacle
- Related Bible parts: Exodus 30, Exodus 31, Leviticus 24, Numbers 28, Numbers 29, 2 Samuel 5, 1 Kings 3, 1 Kings 9, 1 Chronicles 16, 1 Chronicles 22, Jonah 1, Ezra 3

== Sources ==
- Ackroyd, Peter R (1993). "Chronicles, Books of". In Metzger, Bruce M; Coogan, Michael D (eds.). The Oxford Companion to the Bible. Oxford University Press. pp. 113–116. ISBN 978-0195046458.
- Bennett, William (2018). The Expositor's Bible: The Books of Chronicles. Litres. ISBN 978-5040825196.
- Coogan, Michael David (2007). Coogan, Michael David; Brettler, Marc Zvi; Newsom, Carol Ann; Perkins, Pheme (eds.). The New Oxford Annotated Bible with the Apocryphal/Deuterocanonical Books: New Revised Standard Version, Issue 48 (Augmented 3rd ed.). Oxford University Press. ISBN 9780195288810.
- Mabie, Frederick (2017). "I. The Chronicler's Genealogical Survey of All Israel". In Longman III, Tremper; Garland, David E (eds.). 1 and 2 Chronicles. The Expositor's Bible Commentary. Zondervan. pp. 267–308. ISBN 978-0310531814.
- Mathys, H. P. (2007). "14. 1 and 2 Chronicles". In Barton, John; Muddiman, John (eds.). The Oxford Bible Commentary (first (paperback) ed.). Oxford University Press. pp. 267–308. ISBN 978-0199277186.
- Ulrich, Eugene, ed. (2010). The Biblical Qumran Scrolls: Transcriptions and Textual Variants. Brill.
- Würthwein, Ernst (1995). The Text of the Old Testament. Translated by Rhodes, Erroll F. Grand Rapids, MI: William B. Eerdmans. ISBN 0-8028-0788-7.
