= 2 Chronicles 1 =

Second Book of Chronicles, chapter 1

- ← 1 Chronicles 29 chapter 2 →
- The complete Hebrew text of the Books of Chronicles (1st and 2nd Chronicles) in the Leningrad Codex (1008 CE).
- Book: Books of Chronicles
- Category: Ketuvim
- Christian Bible part: Old Testament
- Order in the Christian part: 14

2 Chronicles 1 is the first chapter of the Second Book of Chronicles in the Old Testament of the Christian Bible or of the second part of the Books of Chronicles in the Hebrew Bible. The book is compiled from older sources by an unknown person or group, designated by modern scholars as "the Chronicler", and had the final shape established in late fifth or fourth century BCE. This chapter belongs to the section focusing on the kingship of Solomon (2 Chronicles 1 to 9). The focus of this chapter is Solomon's ascension and wealth.

== Text ==
This chapter was originally written in the Hebrew language and is divided into 17 verses in Christian Bibles, but into 18 verses in the Hebrew Bible with the following verse numbering comparison:

Verse numbering for 2 Chronicles 1 and 2
English	Hebrew
1:1-17	1:1-17
2:1	1:18
2:2-18	2:1-17

This article generally follows the common numbering in Christian English Bible versions, with notes to the numbering in Hebrew Bible versions.

=== Textual witnesses ===
Some early manuscripts containing the text of this chapter in Hebrew are of the Masoretic Text, which includes the Aleppo Codex (10th century) and Codex Leningradensis (1008).

There is also a translation into Koine Greek known as the Septuagint, made in the last few centuries BCE. Extant ancient manuscripts of the Septuagint version include Codex Vaticanus (B; $\mathfrak{G}$^{B}; 4th century), and Codex Alexandrinus (A; $\mathfrak{G}$^{A}; 5th century). (Note: The whole book of 2 Chronicles is missing from the extant Codex Sinaiticus.)

=== Old Testament references ===
- 2 Chronicles 1:1–13: 1 Kings 3:1–15; Psalm 45:1–17; Psalm 72:1–20.
- 2 Chronicles 1:14–17: 1 Kings 10:26–29

== Solomon's sacrifice and prayer at Gibeon (1:1–13) ==
The section records how Solomon began his reign to succeed David in the unified monarchy as David had consolidated domestic support for Solomon (1 Chronicles 25–29). In verses 3–5, the Chronicler attempts to unite all legitimate worship sites and objects, that is the tabernacle built by Moses in the desert, which was placed in Gibeon (1 Chronicles 16:39; 21:29), and the ark of the Covenant, placed in the tent by David in Jerusalem. The Chronicler deliberately presents 'a great people, so numerous they cannot be numbered or counted' (1 Kings 3:8) into 'a people as numerous as the dust of the earth' (verse 9), referring to the promise made to Jacob (or "Israel") in Genesis 28:14. The reference to a promise of an eternal dynasty made to David ('let your promise to my father David now be fulfilled'; cf. 1 Chronicles 17:11–12) refers to verse 1 where Solomon is introduced as David's son and rightful successor by divine choice.

=== Verse 3 ===
So Solomon, and all the congregation with him, went to the high place that was at Gibeon; for there was the tabernacle of the congregation of God, which Moses the servant of the Lord had made in the wilderness.

- "High place": or "Place for worship"

== Solomon's wealth (1:14–17) ==
The record of Solomon's wealth in this section is almost identical to other passages (1 Kings 10:26–29). Here is to illustrate the fulfillment of God's promise to Solomon in Gibeon.

=== Verse 17 ===
And they fetched up, and brought forth out of Egypt a chariot for six hundred shekels of silver, and a horse for an hundred and fifty: and so brought they out horses for all the kings of the Hittites, and for the kings of Syria, by their means.

- "600 shekel of silver": about 15 pounds, or 6.9 kilograms.
- "Shekel": about 2/5 ounce or 11 grams
- "150" (shekel of silver): about 3¾ pounds, or 1.7 kilograms.
- "By their means": literally "by their hands"

== See also ==
- Ark of the Covenant
- Davidic line
- Tabernacle
- Related Bible parts: Genesis 28, Exodus 40, 1 Kings 3, 1 Kings 10, Psalm 45, Psalm 72, 1 Chronicles 16, 1 Chronicles 29

== Sources ==
- Ackroyd, Peter R (1993). "Chronicles, Books of". In Metzger, Bruce M; Coogan, Michael D (eds.). The Oxford Companion to the Bible. Oxford University Press. pp. 113–116. ISBN 978-0195046458.
- Bennett, William (2018). The Expositor's Bible: The Books of Chronicles. Litres. ISBN 978-5040825196.
- Coogan, Michael David (2007). Coogan, Michael David; Brettler, Marc Zvi; Newsom, Carol Ann; Perkins, Pheme (eds.). The New Oxford Annotated Bible with the Apocryphal/Deuterocanonical Books: New Revised Standard Version, Issue 48 (Augmented 3rd ed.). Oxford University Press. ISBN 9780195288810.
- Mabie, Frederick (2017). "I. The Chronicler's Genealogical Survey of All Israel". In Longman III, Tremper; Garland, David E (eds.). 1 and 2 Chronicles. The Expositor's Bible Commentary. Zondervan. pp. 267–308. ISBN 978-0310531814.
- Mathys, H. P. (2007). "14. 1 and 2 Chronicles". In Barton, John; Muddiman, John (eds.). The Oxford Bible Commentary (first (paperback) ed.). Oxford University Press. pp. 267–308. ISBN 978-0199277186.
- Würthwein, Ernst (1995). The Text of the Old Testament. Translated by Rhodes, Erroll F. Grand Rapids, MI: William B. Eerdmans. ISBN 0-8028-0788-7.
