= 1 Kings 6 =

1 Kings, chapter 6

- ← chapter 5 chapter 7 →
- The pages containing the Books of Kings (1 & 2 Kings) Leningrad Codex (1008 CE).
- Book: First book of Kings
- Hebrew Bible part: Nevi'im
- Order in the Hebrew part: 4
- Category: Former Prophets
- Christian Bible part: Old Testament
- Order in the Christian part: 11

1 Kings 6 is the sixth chapter of the Books of Kings in the Hebrew Bible or the First Book of Kings in the Old Testament of the Christian Bible. The book is a compilation of various annals recording the acts of the kings of Israel and Judah by a Deuteronomic compiler in the seventh century BCE, with a supplement added in the sixth century BCE. This chapter belongs to the section focusing on the reign of Solomon over the unified kingdom of Judah and Israel (1 Kings 1 to 11). The focus of this chapter is the reign of Solomon, the king of Israel.

== Text ==
This chapter was originally written in the Hebrew language and since the 16th century is divided into 38 verses.

=== Textual witnesses ===
Some early manuscripts containing the text of this chapter in Hebrew are of the Masoretic Text tradition, which includes the Codex Cairensis (895), Aleppo Codex (10th century), and Codex Leningradensis (1008).

There is also a translation into Koine Greek known as the Septuagint, made in the last few centuries BCE. Extant ancient manuscripts of the Septuagint version include Codex Vaticanus (B; $\mathfrak{G}$^{B}; 4th century) and Codex Alexandrinus (A; $\mathfrak{G}$^{A}; 5th century). (Note: The whole book of 1 Kings is missing from the extant Codex Sinaiticus.)

=== Old Testament references ===
- 1 Kings 6:1–4: 2 Chronicles 3:1–2
- 1 Kings 6:14–22: 2 Chronicles 3:5–9
- 1 Kings 6:23–29: 2 Chronicles 3:10–13

== Analysis ==
1 Kings 6 to 7 cover the building of the temple, with insertions of information about Solomon's palace, the "house of the forest of Lebanon", the hall of the throne, the hall of judgment, and a house for Pharaoh's daughter (1 Kings 7:1–12).

== Construction of the Temple walls (6:1–10) ==
The ground-plan of the temple indicates a long and narrow building which was not particularly large (about 30x10x15 meters), a form that was commonly found in the region of Israel.

=== Verse 1 ===
And it came to pass in the four hundred and eightieth year after the children of Israel had come out of the land of Egypt, in the fourth year of Solomon’s reign over Israel, in the month of Ziv, which is the second month, that he began to build the house of the Lord.

- Cross reference: 1 Kings 6:37
- "The 4th year of Solomon's reign" based on Thiele-McFall calculation, this period ran from September 968 to September 967 BCE, which points to the Exodus in April 1446 BCE, according to this verse.
- "The month of Ziv": or Iyar/Ayyar, which is April or May in Gregorian calendar.

== A word from God to Solomon (6:11–13) ==
In this section it is emphasized that God was not bound to the confines of the temple building, but the temple symbolizes God' permanent presence and thus, 'eternal security', contingent upon the obedience of the people to God's commandments (cf. Psalm 46 and 2 Kings 19:32–34), a message repeated multiple times by the prophets (such as in Jeremiah 7; 26:1–6; Micah 3:9–12; Mark 11:15–19; 13:1–2). Therefore, the existence of the temple does not change the 'essential terms' of the divine-human relationship.

== The interior decoration of the Temple (6:14–38) ==
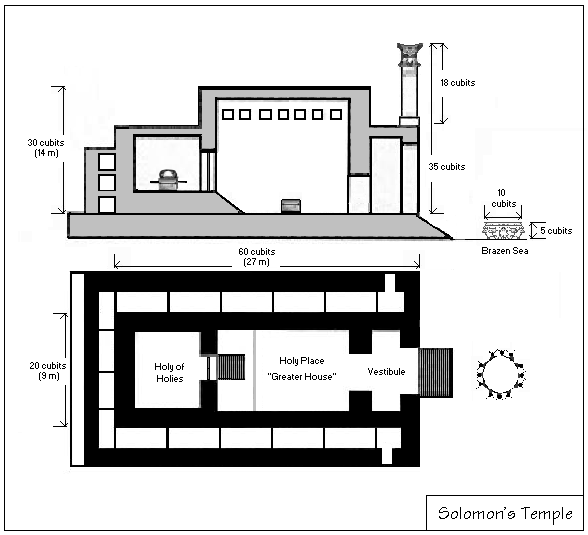
Solomon's Temple design with measurements

All the walls of the holy site were clad with made of costly materials. The ornamentation in wooden panels and carvings s emphatically non-figural (no human or divine figures), but limited to plants and animals, an aniconic characteristic of the YHWH-religion. In comparison to the 'curtain walls and dust floor' of the tabernacle, much of the interior and floor of the temple was covered in gold (1 Kings 6:20–22; 28, 30, 32).

=== Verse 37 ===
In the fourth year the foundation of the house of the Lord was laid, in the month of Ziv.

- Cross reference: 1 Kings 6:1
- "The month of Ziv": or Iyar/Ayyar, which is April or May in Gregorian calendar.

=== Verse 38 ===
And in the eleventh year, in the month of Bul, which is the eighth month, the house was finished in all its details and according to all its plans. So he was seven years in building it.

- "The month of Bul": or Cheshvan/Heshvan, which is October or November in Gregorian calendar. A reference to the month of "Bul" is found in the inscription on the sarcophagus of Eshmunazar II, a Phoenician king of Sidon (reigned c. 539–525 BCE).
- "Seven years": Ziv is the second month (April-May) and Bul is the eighth month (October-November), so it took more precisely "seven years and six months" to complete the temple.

== See also ==
- Cherub
- David
- Israel
- Jerusalem
- Hebrew calendar
- Solomon's Temple
- Related Bible parts: 2 Samuel 7, 1 Kings 5, 2 Chronicles 3

== Sources ==
- Collins, John J. (2014). "Chapter 14: 1 Kings 12 – 2 Kings 25". Introduction to the Hebrew Scriptures. Fortress Press. pp. 277–296. ISBN 978-1451469233.
- Coogan, Michael David (2007). Coogan, Michael David; Brettler, Marc Zvi; Newsom, Carol Ann; Perkins, Pheme (eds.). The New Oxford Annotated Bible with the Apocryphal/Deuterocanonical Books: New Revised Standard Version, Issue 48 (Augmented 3rd ed.). Oxford University Press. ISBN 978-0195288810.
- Dietrich, Walter (2007). "13. 1 and 2 Kings". In Barton, John; Muddiman, John (eds.). The Oxford Bible Commentary (first (paperback) ed.). Oxford University Press. pp. 232–266. ISBN 978-0199277186.
- Halley, Henry H. (1965). Halley's Bible Handbook: an abbreviated Bible commentary (24th (revised) ed.). Zondervan Publishing House. ISBN 0-310-25720-4.
- Hayes, Christine (2015). Introduction to the Bible. Yale University Press. ISBN 978-0300188271.
- Leithart, Peter J. (2006). 1 & 2 Kings. Brazos Theological Commentary on the Bible. Brazos Press. ISBN 978-1587431258.
- McFall, Leslie (1991), "Translation Guide to the Chronological Data in Kings and Chronicles" (PDF), Bibliotheca Sacra, 148: 3–45, archived from the original (PDF) on 2010-08-27
- McKane, William (1993). "Kings, Book of". In Metzger, Bruce M; Coogan, Michael D (eds.). The Oxford Companion to the Bible. Oxford University Press. pp. 409–413. ISBN 978-0195046458.
- Metzger, Bruce M; Coogan, Michael D, eds. (1993). The Oxford Companion to the Bible. Oxford University Press. ISBN 978-0195046458.
- Thiele, Edwin R. (1983). The Mysterious Numbers of the Hebrew Kings (3rd ed.). Grand Rapids, Michigan: Zondervan. ISBN 978-0-310-36010-0.
- Würthwein, Ernst (1995). The Text of the Old Testament. Translated by Rhodes, Erroll F. Grand Rapids, MI: Wm. B. Eerdmans. ISBN 0-8028-0788-7.
