= Bruce M. Metzger =

American biblical scholar (1914–2007)

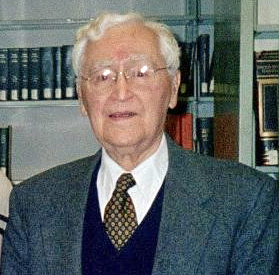
- Born: Bruce Manning Metzger; February 9, 1914; Middletown, Dauphin County, Pennsylvania, US
- Died: February 13, 2007 (aged 93); Princeton, New Jersey, US
- Spouse: Isobel Metzger (m. 1944)

Academic background
- Education: Lebanon Valley College; Princeton Theological Seminary; Princeton University
- Thesis: Studies in a Greek Gospel Lectionary (Greg. 303) (1942)

Academic work
- Era: 20th century
- Discipline: Biblical studies
- Institutions: Princeton Theological Seminary
- Notable students: Greg Boyd, Bart D. Ehrman, Michael J. Gorman
- Main interests: Textual criticism of the New Testament; New Testament canon
- Notable works: Lexical Aids for Students of New Testament Greek (1955); The Canon of the New Testament (1987)

Bruce Manning Metzger (February 9, 1914 – February 13, 2007) was an American biblical scholar and historian who spent his career at Princeton Theological Seminary. Metzger specialized in textual criticism and Bible translation and chaired committees for the Revised Standard Version and New Revised Standard Version. He served on the board of the American Bible Society and United Bible Societies. He was elected to the American Philosophical Society in 1986. Metzger is among the most influential New Testament scholars of the 20th century.

== Early life and education ==
Metzger was born on February 9, 1914, in Middletown, Pennsylvania, and earned his BA in 1935 at Lebanon Valley College. He had strong academic training in Greek before enrolling in Princeton Seminary and in the summer prior to entering the Seminary he completed reading through the entire Bible consecutively for the twelfth time. He received his ThB in 1938 at Princeton Theological Seminary and in the autumn of that year began teaching at Princeton as a Teaching Fellow in New Testament Greek. On April 11, 1939, he was ordained in the United Presbyterian Church of North America, which has since merged with the Presbyterian Church in the United States of America (PCUSA) and is now known as the Presbyterian Church (USA). In 1940 he earned his MA from Princeton University and became an instructor in New Testament. Two years later he earned his PhD, "Studies in a Greek Gospel Lectionary (Greg. 303)", also from Princeton University.

== Princeton Theological Seminary career ==
In 1944 Metzger married Isobel Elizabeth Mackay, daughter of the third president of the Seminary, Scottish theologian John A. Mackay. That year he was promoted to assistant professor. In 1948 he became associate professor and in 1954 he was named full professor. In 1964 Metzger became the George L. Collord Professor of New Testament Language and Literature. In 1969 he was elected to membership in the Catholic Biblical Association. In 1971 he served as president of both the Studiorum Novi Testamenti Societas and the Society of Biblical Literature. The following year he became president of the North American Patristic Society. Metzger was visiting fellow at Clare Hall, Cambridge in 1974 and at Wolfson College, Oxford in 1979. In 1978 he was elected corresponding fellow of the British Academy, the academy's highest distinction for persons who are not residents in the United Kingdom. In 1986 Metzger became a member of the American Philosophical Society. At the age of seventy, after teaching at Princeton Theological Seminary for forty-six years, he retired as professor Emeritus.

In 1994 Bruce Metzger was honored with the Burkitt Medal for Biblical Studies by the British Academy. He was awarded honorary doctorates from Lebanon Valley College, Findlay College, the University of St Andrews, the University of Münster and Potchefstroom University. "Metzger's unrivaled knowledge of the relevant languages, ancient and modern; his balanced judgment; and his painstaking attention to detail won him respect across the theological and academic spectrum." Conservative evangelical scholar Daniel B. Wallace described Metzger as "a fine, godly, conservative scholar, although his view of biblical authority is not quite the same as many other evangelicals."

== Later life and death ==
Shortly after his 93rd birthday, Metzger died in Princeton, New Jersey, on February 13, 2007. He was survived by his wife Isobel, who died at the age of 98 on July 27, 2016, in Princeton, New Jersey, as well as their two sons, John Mackay Metzger and Dr. James Bruce Metzger (1952–2020).

== Scholarship and translations ==
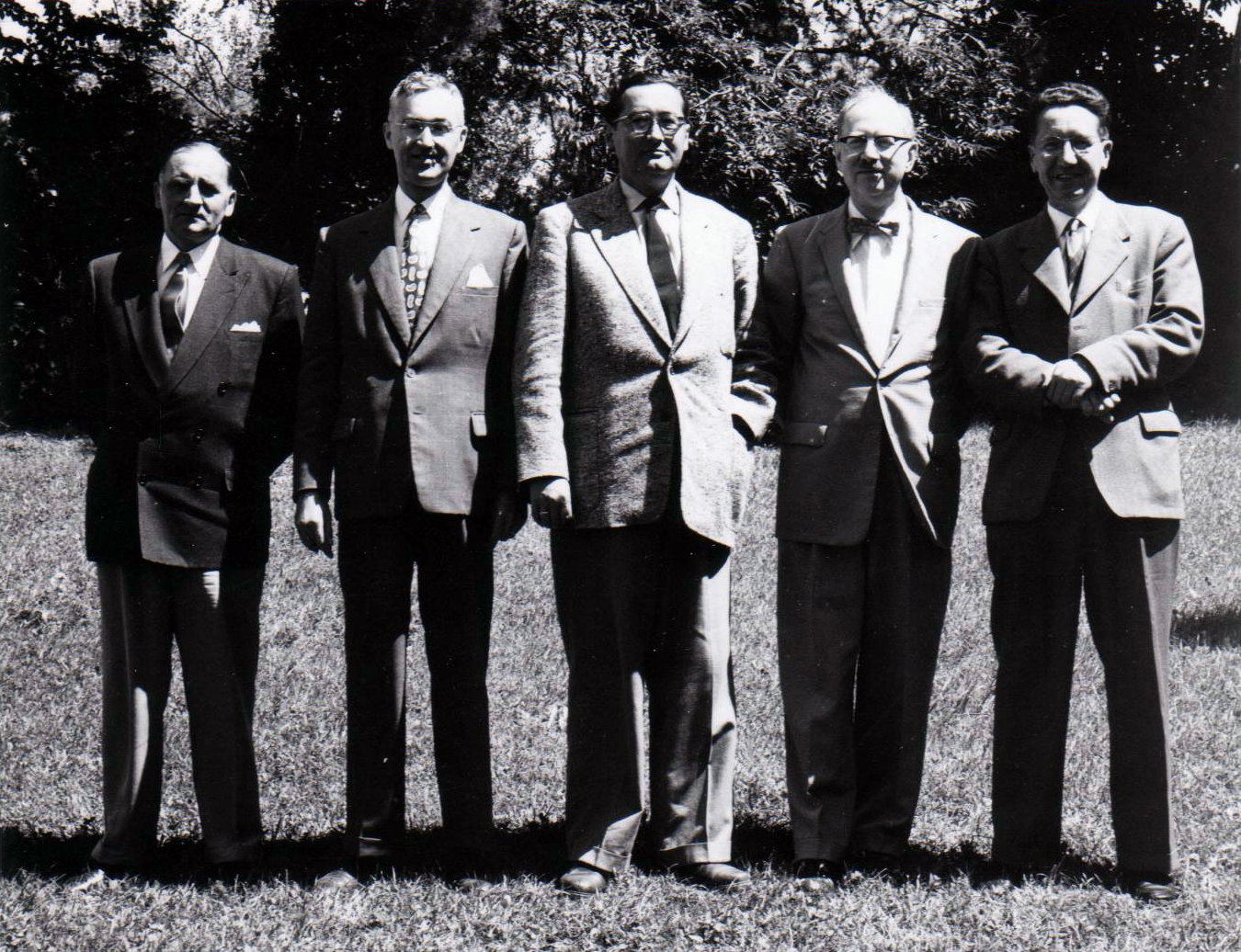
Left to right: unidentified, Bruce Metzger, Kurt Aland (center), Allen Wikgren, Matthew Black

Metzger edited and provided commentary for many Bible translations and wrote dozens of books. He was an editor of the United Bible Societies' standard Greek New Testament, the starting point for nearly all recent New Testament translations. In 1952 he became a contributor to the Revised Standard Version (RSV) of the Bible and served as general editor of the Reader's Digest Bible (a condensed version of the RSV) in 1982. From 1977 to 1990 he chaired the Committee on Translators for the New Revised Standard Version (NRSV) of the Bible and was "largely responsible for ... seeing [the NRSV] through the press." He considered it a privilege to present the NRSV, which includes the books referred to as Apocrypha by Protestants, though Roman Catholics and Eastern Orthodox consider them deuterocanonical, to Pope John Paul II and Patriarch Demetrius I of Constantinople. Metzger served on the boards of the American Bible Society and United Bible Societies.

Central to his scholarly contribution to New Testament studies is his trilogy The Text of the New Testament: Its Transmission, Corruption, and Restoration (1964; 2nd ed., 1968; 3rd enlarged ed., 1992), The Early Versions of the New Testament: Their Origin, Transmission, and Limitations (1977), and The Canon of the New Testament: Its Origin, Development, and Significance (1987). The first volume of the series that he founded and edited, New Testament Tools and Studies, appeared in 1960.

Metzger's commentaries often use historical criticism and higher criticism, which attempt to explain the literary and historical origins of the Bible and the biblical canon. He wrote that the early church saw it as very important that a work describing Jesus' life be written by a follower of or an eyewitness to Jesus and considered other works such as The Shepherd of Hermas and the Epistles of Clement to be inspired but not canonical.

In discussing the canon, Metzger identified three criteria "for acceptance of particular writings as sacred, authoritative, and worthy of being read in services of worship...", criteria that were "generally adopted during the course of the second century, and were never modified thereafter", namely orthodoxy (conformity to the rule of faith), apostolicity, and consensus among the churches. He concluded that, "In the most basic sense neither individuals nor councils created the canon; instead they came to recognize and acknowledge the self-authenticating quality of these writings, which imposed themselves as canonical upon the church."

He served on the advisory board for Peake's Commentary on the Bible (1962) and contributed an article on "The Early Versions of the New Testament." He was co-editor for The Oxford Companion to the Bible (1993).

== Selected works ==
=== Books ===
- Metzger, Bruce M. (1942). Studies in a Greek Gospel Lectionary (Greg. 303) (Ph.D.). Princeton, NJ: Princeton University.
- ——— (1946). Lexical Aids for Students of New Testament Greek. Princeton, NJ: Princeton University Press. OCLC 2132643.
- ——— (1957). Introduction to the Apocrypha. New York: Oxford University Press. OCLC 361082.
- ——— (1961). List of Words Occuring Frequently in the Coptic New Testament (Sahidic Dialect). Leiden: Brill. – note: "occuring" is misspelled in the published title
- ———; Metzger, Isobel M. (1962). The Oxford Concise Concordance to the Revised Standard Version of the Holy Bible (1st ed.). London: Oxford University Press.
- ——— (1963). Chapters in the History of New Testament Textual Criticism. New Testament Tools and Studies. Vol. 4. Leiden: Brill.
- ——— (1964). The Text of the New Testament: Its Transmission, Corruption, And Restoration (1st ed.). Oxford: Clarendon Press.
- ——— (1965). The New Testament: Its Background, Growth and Content (1st ed.). New York: Abingdon Press. ISBN 978-0-6872-7913-5. OCLC 341779.
- ——— (1968). Historical and Literary Studies: Pagan, Jewish, and Christian. Leiden: Brill.
- ——— (1977). The Early Versions of the New Testament: Their Origin, Transmission, and Limitations. Oxford: Clarendon Press. ISBN 978-0-1982-6170-4. OCLC 3155516.
- ——— (1980). New Testament Studies: Philological, Versional, and Patristic. Leiden: Brill. ISBN 978-9-004-06163-7.
- ——— (1981). Manuscripts of the Greek Bible: An Introduction to Palaeography. New York: Oxford University Press. ISBN 978-0-195-02924-6. OCLC 6943206.
- ——— (1983). The Reader's Bible: condensed from the Revised Standard Version Old and New Testaments. Pleasantville, NY: Reader's Digest Association. ISBN 978-0-895-77106-3. OCLC 8817548.
- ——— (1987). The Canon of the New Testament: Its Origin, Development, and Significance. Oxford: Clarendon Press. ISBN 978-0-198-26180-3. OCLC 14188714.
- ———; Dentan, Robert C.; Harrelson, Walter (1991). The Making of the New Revised Standard Version of the Bible. Grand Rapids, MI: Eerdmans. ISBN 978-0-802-80620-8.
- ———; Coogan, Michael D., eds. (1993). The Oxford Companion to the Bible. New York: Oxford University Press. ISBN 978-0-195-04645-8. OCLC 27895183.
- ——— (1994). Textual Commentary on the Greek New Testament: a companion volume to the United Bible Societies' Greek New Testament (third ed.). London; New York: United Bible Societies. ISBN 978-3-438-06010-5. OCLC 683422.
- ——— (1997). Reminiscences of an Octogenarian. Peabody, MA: Hendrickson Publishers. ISBN 978-1-5656-3264-6.
- ——— (1999). Breaking the Code: Understanding the Book of Revelation (Leader's ed.). Nashville, TN: Abingdon Press. ISBN 978-0-6874-9779-9.
- ———; Aland, Barbara; et al. (2000). Greek New Testament. Deutsche Bibelgesellschaft. ISBN 978-3-438-05110-3.
- ———; Coogan, Michael D., eds. (2001). The Oxford Guide to People & Places of the Bible. Oxford; New York: Oxford University Press. ISBN 9780195146417. OCLC 45439956.
- ——— (2001). The Bible in Translation, Ancient and English Versions. Grand Rapids, MI: Baker Academic. ISBN 978-0-801-02282-1. OCLC 47100891.
- ———; Coogan, Michael D., eds. (2002). The Oxford Essential Guide to Ideas and Issues of the Bible. Oxford; New York: Oxford University Press. ISBN 978-0-195-14917-3. OCLC 47074788.
- ——— (2002). The New Testament: Its Background, Growth and Content (Reprint ed.). Cambridge: James Clarke & Co. ISBN 978-0-227-17025-0. OCLC 227928641.
- ———; Ehrman, Bart D. (2005). The Text of the New Testament: Its Transmission, Corruption, And Restoration (4th ed.). Oxford: Clarendon Press. ISBN 0-19-516122-X.
- ——— (2006). Apostolic Letters of Faith, Hope, and Love: Galatians, 1 Peter, and 1 John. Eugene, OR: Cascade Books. ISBN 978-1-5975-2501-5.

=== Translations ===
- Oxford Annotated Apocrypha: The Apocrypha of the Old Testament. Translated by Metzger, Bruce M. 1977.
- The New Oxford Annotated Bible with the Apocrypha, Revised Standard Version, Expanded Edition. Translated by Metzger, Bruce M.; May, Herbert G. 1977.
- Oxford Annotated Apocrypha: Revised Standard Version. Translated by Metzger, Bruce M. 1977.
- New Revised Standard Version. Translated by Metzger, Bruce M. 1989.
- The NRSV Bible with the Apocrypha, Compact Edition. Translated by Metzger, Bruce M. 2003.

=== Articles and chapters ===
- ——— (May 27, 1966). "The Meaning of Christ's Ascension". Christianity Today. 10 (17): 3–4.
- ——— (1970). "Names for the Nameless in the New Testament: A Study in the Growth of Christian Tradition". In Granfield, Patrick; Jungmann, Josef A. (eds.). Kyriakon: Festschrift Johannes Quasten. Vol. 1. Münster: Verlag Aschendorff. pp. 79–99.
- ——— (1972). "Patristic Evidence and Textual Criticism of the New Testament". New Testament Studies. 18 (4): 379–400. doi:10.1017/S0028688500023705. S2CID 170833089. - Presidential Address, Studiorum Novi Testamenti Societas, delivered August 24, 1971, at Noordwijkerhout, The Netherlands.
- ——— (1972). "Literary forgeries and canonical pseudepigrapha". Journal of Biblical Literature. 91 (1): 3–24. doi:10.2307/3262916. JSTOR 3262916. - Presidential address, Society of Biblical Literature, delivered October 29, 1971, in Atlanta, Georgia.
- ——— (November 1984). "How Well Do You Know the Apocrypha?". Guideposts. pp. 28–31.

=== Selected interviews and writings about Bruce M. Metzger ===
- Minear, Paul S. (January 1983). "A Scholar's Scholar". Theology Today. 39 (4): 418–20. doi:10.1177/004057368303900411. S2CID 170746359.
- Strobel, Lee (1998). "the Second Interview: Bruce M. Metzger, PH.D.". The Case for Christ (2008 ed.). Grand Rapids, MI: Zondervan. pp. 57–71. ISBN 978-0-310-29604-1.

=== Festschriften ===
- Epp, Eldon Jay; Fee, Gordon D., eds. (1981). New Testament Textual Criticism: Its Significance for Exegesis: Essays in Honour of Bruce M. Metzger. Oxford: Clarendon Press. ISBN 978-0-198-26175-9.
- Petzer, Jacobus H.; Hartin, Patrick J., eds. (1986). A South African Perspective on the New Testament, Essays by South African New Testament Scholars Presented to Bruce Manning Metzger during His Visit to South Africa in 1985. Leiden: Brill. ISBN 978-9-004-07720-1.
- Ehrman, Bart D.; Holmes, Michael W., eds. (1989). The Text of the New Testament in Contemporary Research: Essays on the Status Quaestionis. Grand Rapids, MI: Eerdmans. ISBN 978-0-802-84824-6.
