= 2 Chronicles 10 =

Second Book of Chronicles, chapter 10

- ← chapter 9 chapter 11 →
- The complete Hebrew text of the Books of Chronicles (1st and 2nd Chronicles) in the Leningrad Codex (1008 CE).
- Book: Books of Chronicles
- Category: Ketuvim
- Christian Bible part: Old Testament
- Order in the Christian part: 14

2 Chronicles 10 is the tenth chapter of the Second Book of Chronicles the Old Testament in the Christian Bible or of the second part of the Books of Chronicles in the Hebrew Bible. The book is compiled from older sources by an unknown person or group, designated by modern scholars as "the Chronicler", and had the final shape established in late fifth or fourth century BCE. This chapter belongs to the section focusing on the kingdom of Judah until its destruction by the Babylonians under Nebuchadnezzar and the beginning of restoration under Cyrus the Great of Persia (2 Chronicles 10 to 36). The focus of this chapter is the kingdom of Israel's division in the beginning of Rehoboam's reign.

== Text ==
This chapter was originally written in the Hebrew language and is divided into 19 verses.

=== Textual witnesses ===
Some early manuscripts containing the text of this chapter in Hebrew are of the Masoretic Text tradition, which includes the Aleppo Codex (10th century), and Codex Leningradensis (1008).

There is also a translation into Koine Greek known as the Septuagint, made in the last few centuries BCE. Extant ancient manuscripts of the Septuagint version include Codex Vaticanus (B; $\mathfrak{G}$^{B}; 4th century), and Codex Alexandrinus (A; $\mathfrak{G}$^{A}; 5th century). (Note: The whole book of 2 Chronicles is missing from the extant Codex Sinaiticus.)

=== Old Testament references ===
- 2 Chronicles 10:1–15: 1 Kings 12:1–15
- 2 Chronicles 10:16–19: 1 Kings 12:16–19

== Rebellion against Rehoboam (10:1–15) ==
The whole passage (until verse 19) parallels 1 Kings 12:1–19 with only a few verbal alterations. After inheriting the throne from his father, Rehoboam went to Shechem to be confirmed as king. The northern tribes of Israel called Jeroboam (who fled to Egypt for fear of Solomon) to lead them in requesting a relaxation of financial burden applied by Solomon. Rehoboam, refusing the old men's counsel, but following the advice of young men, replied to them roughly, so ten tribes (not including Judah and Benjamin) revolted and established the northern kingdom, killed Hadoram, Rehoboam's officer, and forced Rehoboam to flee to Jerusalem (verse 18).

=== Verse 1 ===
And Rehoboam went to Shechem for to Shechem were all Israel come to make him king.

- "Shechem" (also written as Sichem, Sychem or Sychar in John 4:5, 20): a historic town in the history of Israel (Genesis 12:6; Genesis 33:18, 19; Genesis 34; Genesis 35:1-4; Genesis 37:12, 28; Genesis 43:22; Genesis 49:5-7; Deuteronomy 27:11; Joshua 8:30-35; 17:7; 20:7; 21:21; 24:1-28; 1 Kings 12:1-17; 1 Chronicles 6:52; 7:28), located in the hill country of the tribe of Ephraim between Mounts Ebal and Gerizim.

Jacob's well is located about 0.5 miles (0.80 km) south-east of it, and Joseph's tomb is 2 miles (3.2 km) to the east (Joshua 24:32).

== The kingdom divided (10:16–19) ==
The kingdom's division is presented in the Chronicles as God's will, in accordance with the interpretation of 1 Kings. However, some facts about Solomon's falling away and Jeroboam's background (explained in 1 Kings 11) are not reported. The war with Jeroboam was only a side issue in this chapter and is elaborated in chapter 13 (see 1 Kings 12).

=== Verse 18 ===
Then King Rehoboam sent Hadoram [who] was over the tribute; and the children of Israel stoned him with stones, [and] he died. But King Rehoboam made speed to get him up to his chariot, to flee to Jerusalem.

- "Hadoram": In the parallel verse 1 Kings 12:18 this name appears as "Adoram" (following Masoretic Text) or "Adoniram" (according to the Old Greek translation and Syriac Peshitta; cf. 1 Kings 4:6).

== See also ==
- Jeroboam
- Jerusalem
- Rehoboam
- Shechem
- Related Bible parts: Genesis 12, Genesis 33, Genesis 34; Genesis 35, Genesis 37, Genesis 43, Genesis 49, Deuteronomy 27, Joshua 8, Joshua 17, Joshua 20; Joshua 21, Joshua 24, 1 Kings 1, 1 Kings 10, 1 Kings 11, 1 Kings 12, 1 Chronicles 6, 1 Chronicles 22, 1 Chronicles 29, Matthew 12, Luke 11

== Sources ==
- Ackroyd, Peter R (1993). "Chronicles, Books of". In Metzger, Bruce M; Coogan, Michael D (eds.). The Oxford Companion to the Bible. Oxford University Press. pp. 113–116. ISBN 978-0195046458.
- Bennett, William (2018). The Expositor's Bible: The Books of Chronicles. Litres. ISBN 978-5040825196.
- Coogan, Michael David (2007). Coogan, Michael David; Brettler, Marc Zvi; Newsom, Carol Ann; Perkins, Pheme (eds.). The New Oxford Annotated Bible with the Apocryphal/Deuterocanonical Books: New Revised Standard Version, Issue 48 (Augmented 3rd ed.). Oxford University Press. ISBN 9780195288810.
- Mabie, Frederick (2017). "I. The Chronicler's Genealogical Survey of All Israel". In Longman III, Tremper; Garland, David E (eds.). 1 and 2 Chronicles. The Expositor's Bible Commentary. Zondervan. pp. 267–308. ISBN 978-0310531814.
- Mathys, H. P. (2007). "14. 1 and 2 Chronicles". In Barton, John; Muddiman, John (eds.). The Oxford Bible Commentary (first (paperback) ed.). Oxford University Press. pp. 267–308. ISBN 978-0199277186.
- Würthwein, Ernst (1995). The Text of the Old Testament. Translated by Rhodes, Erroll F. Grand Rapids, MI: William B. Eerdmans. ISBN 0-8028-0788-7.
