= 1 Chronicles 27 =

First Book of Chronicles, chapter 27

- ← chapter 26 chapter 28 →
- The complete Hebrew text of the Books of Chronicles (1 and 2 Chronicles) in the Leningrad Codex (1008 CE).
- Book: Books of Chronicles
- Category: Ketuvim
- Christian Bible part: Old Testament
- Order in the Christian part: 13

1 Chronicles 27 is the twenty-seventh chapter of the Books of Chronicles in the Hebrew Bible or the First Book of Chronicles in the Old Testament of the Christian Bible. The book is compiled from older sources by an unknown person or group, designated by modern scholars as "the Chronicler", and had the final shape established in late fifth or fourth century BCE. This chapter comprises five parts: David's military divisions and their commanders (verses 1–15), the leaders of the tribes (verses 16–22), a comment on the census (verses 23–24), David's civil officers (verses 25–31), and David's advisers (verses 32–34). The whole chapter belongs to the section focusing on the kingship of David (1 Chronicles 9:35 to 29:30), which from chapter 22 to the end does not have parallel in 2 Samuel.

== Text ==
This chapter was originally written in the Hebrew language. It is divided into 34 verses.

=== Textual witnesses ===
Some early manuscripts containing the text of this chapter in Hebrew are of the Masoretic Text tradition, which includes the Aleppo Codex (10th century), and Codex Leningradensis (1008).

Extant manuscripts of a Koine Greek translation known as the Septuagint, made in the last few centuries BCE, include Codex Vaticanus (B; $\mathfrak{G}$^{B}; 4th century), Codex Alexandrinus (A; $\mathfrak{G}$^{A}; 5th century) and Codex Marchalianus (Q; $\mathfrak{G}$^{Q}; 6th century). (Note: The extant Codex Sinaiticus only contains 1 Chronicles 9:27–19:17.)

== David's military divisions and their commanders (27:1–15) ==
The organization of the military was as orderly as that of the priests and Levites. The military forces consisted of 12 divisions of 24,000 men, each subdivided into thousands and hundreds and headed by a divisional leader, reflecting David's standard administrative procedure (1 Chronicles 23:6-23; 24:1-19; 25:8-31; 26:1-12). Each division serves for one month a year, similar to Solomon's system of twelve royal officers in charge of one-month supplying the royal court (1 Kings 4:7).. The divisions' commanders are all mentioned in the list of David's heroes (11:10-47; 2 Samuel 23:8-39), though they are not the first twelve names stated and by contrast to chapter 11, the origins of names all come from the center of David's kingdom. The total army is enormous (288,000 men) and is only deployed as a militia in times of war. Some incongruities with ch. 11 as well as certain other details (such as two commanders of some departments) suggest that this passage is based on real circumstances.

=== Verse 1 ===
And the children of Israel, according to their number, the heads of fathers’ houses, the captains of thousands and hundreds and their officers, served the king in every matter of the military divisions. These divisions came in and went out month by month throughout all the months of the year, each division having twenty-four thousand.

- "According to their number": from Hebrew: לְֽמִסְפָּרָ֡ם lə-mis-pā-rām, here and in verses 23–24 (cf. 23:3) has the root noun "mispar" which means "number, tally" or can be rendered as "census" (rather than "list").

== Leaders of the tribes (27:16–22) ==
The list following the army leaders is of the (political) leaders of the tribes. (cf. 1 Chronicles 5:6). These leaders are presumed to be involved in carrying out the census reported in verse 23. The twelve tribes are not listed according to a consistent system in the Hebrew Bible, nor using the same names (some tribal chiefs can only be found in the Chronicles. It is most similar to Numbers 1 (which also involves a census), although not identical. The omission of Gad and Asher and the separation of the Aaronites from Levi are particularly notable in this list.

== Comment on the census (27:23–24) ==
Mathys considers these verses 'an extremely artistic attempt at twisting the story of the census (1 Chronicles 21) to grant David forgiveness for his deed', as it (implicitly) exonerates David by stating him follow the rules laid down for censuses in Numbers 1:2–4 (by counting only men older than 20 years) and by giving a justification 'for the LORD had promised to make Israel as numerous as the stars of heaven' (cf. Genesis 15:5), as spoken by the Lord to Abraham (Genesis 22:17).

== David's civil officers (27:25–31) ==
This section records detailed information on David's wealth, the geographical dispersal of his agricultural estates (verse 27), as well as the storehouse in both urban and ruler areas (verses 27–28), and his highest-ranking administrative officers to oversee the trades (verse 30; camels and donkeys are not related directly to agriculture, but to trade). The list is regarded as a reliable historical document, that correctly reflects David's treasury; its historical authenticity is supported by several impressive arguments: the administration is simpler than during Solomon's reign and nothing contradicts the list's authenticity. The Bedouin (foreigners to the Israelites) were employed in David's administrators for their skill at keeping camels and smaller livestock. The extensive discussion of agriculture is typical in the Chronicles (as also observed in Uzziah's passion of agriculture in 2 Chronicles 26:10).

== David's advisers (27:32–34) ==
This section lists David's closest officials, but not a parallel to the list of David's state officials in 1 Chronicles 18:15-17. With historical information given as an aside, it seems not to be an official list.

=== Verse 33 ===
And Ahithophel was the king's counsellor: and Hushai the Archite was the king's companion:

A specific account related to Ahitophel and Hushai is recorded in 2 Samuel 15:12, 23–37.

== See also ==
- David's Mighty Warriors
- Davidic line
- Jerusalem
- Solomon
- Related Bible parts: Genesis 15, Genesis 22, Numbers 1, 2 Samuel 15, 2 Samuel 23, 1 Chronicles 11, 1 Chronicles 18, 1 Chronicles 23, 1 Chronicles 24, 1 Chronicles 25, 2 Chronicles 26

== Sources ==
- Ackroyd, Peter R (1993). "Chronicles, Books of". In Metzger, Bruce M; Coogan, Michael D (eds.). The Oxford Companion to the Bible. Oxford University Press. pp. 113–116. ISBN 978-0195046458.
- Bennett, William (2018). The Expositor's Bible: The Books of Chronicles. Litres. ISBN 978-5040825196.
- Coogan, Michael David (2007). Coogan, Michael David; Brettler, Marc Zvi; Newsom, Carol Ann; Perkins, Pheme (eds.). The New Oxford Annotated Bible with the Apocryphal/Deuterocanonical Books: New Revised Standard Version, Issue 48 (Augmented 3rd ed.). Oxford University Press. ISBN 9780195288810.
- Endres, John C. (2012). First and Second Chronicles. Liturgical Press. ISBN 9780814628447.
- Hill, Andrew E. (2003). First and Second Chronicles. Zondervan. ISBN 9780310206101.
- Mabie, Frederick (2017). "I. The Chronicler's Genealogical Survey of All Israel". In Longman III, Tremper; Garland, David E (eds.). 1 and 2 Chronicles. The Expositor's Bible Commentary. Zondervan. pp. 267–308. ISBN 978-0310531814.
- Mathys, H. P. (2007). "14. 1 and 2 Chronicles". In Barton, John; Muddiman, John (eds.). The Oxford Bible Commentary (first (paperback) ed.). Oxford University Press. pp. 267–308. ISBN 978-0199277186.
- Tuell, Steven S. (2012). First and Second Chronicles. Westminster John Knox Press. ISBN 978-0664238650.
- Würthwein, Ernst (1995). The Text of the Old Testament. Translated by Rhodes, Erroll F. Grand Rapids, MI: William B. Eerdmans. ISBN 0-8028-0788-7.
