= 2 Chronicles 8 =

Second Book of Chronicles, chapter 8

- ← chapter 7 chapter 9 →
- The complete Hebrew text of the Books of Chronicles (1st and 2nd Chronicles) in the Leningrad Codex (1008 CE).
- Book: Books of Chronicles
- Category: Ketuvim
- Christian Bible part: Old Testament
- Order in the Christian part: 14

2 Chronicles 8 is the eighth chapter of the Second Book of Chronicles the Old Testament in the Christian Bible or of the second part of the Books of Chronicles in the Hebrew Bible. The book is compiled from older sources by an unknown person or group, designated by modern scholars as "the Chronicler", and had the final shape established in late fifth or fourth century BCE. This chapter belongs to the section focusing on the kingship of Solomon (2 Chronicles 1 to 9). The focus of this chapter is Solomon's other building projects and commercial efforts.

== Text ==
This chapter was originally written in the Hebrew language and is divided into 18 verses.

=== Textual witnesses ===
Some early manuscripts containing the text of this chapter in Hebrew are of the Masoretic Text, which includes the Aleppo Codex (10th century) and Codex Leningradensis (1008.

There is also a translation into Koine Greek known as the Septuagint, made in the last few centuries BCE. Extant ancient manuscripts of the Septuagint version include Codex Vaticanus (B; $\mathfrak{G}$^{B}; 4th century), and Codex Alexandrinus (A; $\mathfrak{G}$^{A}; 5th century). (Note: The whole book of 2 Chronicles is missing from the extant Codex Sinaiticus.)

=== Old Testament references ===
- 2 Chronicles 8:1–18: 1 Kings 9:10–28

== Solomon's other building projects (8:1–11) ==
This section reports that Solomon received additional cities from Hiram the king of Tyre, whereas reported in 1 Kings 9, Solomon gave Hiram 20 cities, probably in exchange. Solomon sent Israelites to settle in those cities, similar as the policy of the Assyrian towards the defeated northern kingdom in 2 Kings 17:24–8. The remaining population of non-Israelites were employed as slave workers by Solomon, with Israelites as guards exempted from the works (verses 7–10). Solomon was proud to have Pharaoh's daughter as his wife, so he built her a special house, also that she, as a woman (and foreigner), was not to come into contact with holy things.

=== Verse 1 ===
And it came to pass at the end of twenty years, wherein Solomon had built the house of the Lord, and his own house,

- "Twenty years": is counted from the fourth year of Solomon's reign, when he began to build the house of the Lord (the Temple) for seven years, then 13 years in finishing and furnishing it, while at the same time he also built and furnished his own palace.

=== Verse 2 ===
that the cities which Hiram had given to Solomon, Solomon built them; and he settled the children of Israel there.

- "Hiram": Hebrew: "Huram" as in 2 Chronicles 2:3; 2 Chronicles 8:18), which is a variant spelling referring to the same individual. Some medieval Hebrew mss, along with the Greek Septuagint, Syriac, and Latin Vulgate spell the name "Hiram", as with 1 Chronicles 14:1.

=== Verse 3 ===
And Solomon went to Hamath Zobah and seized it.

- "Hamath Zobah": were known as two separate kingdoms in Syria.

=== Verse 4 ===
And he built Tadmor in the wilderness, and all the store cities, which he built in Hamath.

- "Tadmor": later known as "Palmyra", was an important oasis in the desert of Syria, c. 225 kilometres (140 mi) northeast of Damascus. This showed the extent of Solomon's control to the north.

== Public worship established at the Temple (8:12–16) ==
The passage details how Solomon kept the commandments of Moses in offerings and David's ordinances in the appointments of priests and Levites (1 Chronicles 22:7–16; 28:6–10, 20–21). The three annual festivals are named here, along with the daily sacrifices as well as for sabbath and the new moons.

== Solomon's fleet (8:17–18) ==
This part parallels 1 Kings 9:26-28, with "the sea" refers to the Red Sea.

== See also ==
- Ezion-Geber
- Hamath
- Ophir
- Related Bible parts: Exodus 34, Leviticus 23, 1 Kings 7, 1 Kings 8, 1 Kings 9, 1 Chronicles 22, 1 Chronicles 28

== Sources ==
- Ackroyd, Peter R (1993). "Chronicles, Books of". In Metzger, Bruce M; Coogan, Michael D (eds.). The Oxford Companion to the Bible. Oxford University Press. pp. 113–116. ISBN 978-0195046458.
- Bennett, William (2018). The Expositor's Bible: The Books of Chronicles. Litres. ISBN 978-5040825196.
- Coogan, Michael David (2007). Coogan, Michael David; Brettler, Marc Zvi; Newsom, Carol Ann; Perkins, Pheme (eds.). The New Oxford Annotated Bible with the Apocryphal/Deuterocanonical Books: New Revised Standard Version, Issue 48 (Augmented 3rd ed.). Oxford University Press. ISBN 9780195288810.
- Mabie, Frederick (2017). "I. The Chronicler's Genealogical Survey of All Israel". In Longman III, Tremper; Garland, David E (eds.). 1 and 2 Chronicles. The Expositor's Bible Commentary. Zondervan. pp. 267–308. ISBN 978-0310531814.
- Mathys, H. P. (2007). "14. 1 and 2 Chronicles". In Barton, John; Muddiman, John (eds.). The Oxford Bible Commentary (first (paperback) ed.). Oxford University Press. pp. 267–308. ISBN 978-0199277186.
- Würthwein, Ernst (1995). The Text of the Old Testament. Translated by Rhodes, Erroll F. Grand Rapids, MI: William B. Eerdmans. ISBN 0-8028-0788-7.
