= 1 Chronicles 26 =

First Book of Chronicles, chapter 26

- ← chapter 25 chapter 27 →
- The complete Hebrew text of the Books of Chronicles (1 and 2 Chronicles) in the Leningrad Codex (1008 CE).
- Book: Books of Chronicles
- Category: Ketuvim
- Christian Bible part: Old Testament
- Order in the Christian part: 13

1 Chronicles 26 is the twenty-sixth chapter of the Books of Chronicles in the Hebrew Bible or the First Book of Chronicles in the Old Testament of the Christian Bible. The book is compiled from older sources by an unknown person or group, designated by modern scholars as "the Chronicler", and had the final shape established in late fifth or fourth century BCE. This chapter describes particular duties of the Levites as gatekeepers (verses 1–19), the temple treasurers (verses 20–28), officers and judges (verses 29–32). The whole chapter belongs to the section focusing on the kingship of David (1 Chronicles 9:35 to 29:30), which from chapter 22 to the end does not have parallel in 2 Samuel.

== Text ==
This chapter was originally written in the Hebrew language. It is divided into 32 verses.

=== Textual witnesses ===
Some early manuscripts containing the text of this chapter in Hebrew are of the Masoretic Text tradition, which includes the Aleppo Codex (10th century), and Codex Leningradensis (1008).

Extant manuscripts of a Koine Greek translation known as the Septuagint, made in the last few centuries BCE, include Codex Vaticanus (B; $\mathfrak{G}$^{B}; 4th century), Codex Alexandrinus (A; $\mathfrak{G}$^{A}; 5th century) and Codex Marchalianus (Q; $\mathfrak{G}$^{Q}; 6th century). (Note: The extant Codex Sinaiticus only contains 1 Chronicles 9:27–19:17.)

== The gatekeepers (26:1–19) ==
This section describes the gatekeepers as a part of David's administrative organization, whom are counted as Levites in the Chronicles (cf. Ezra 2:42, 70; Nehemiah 11:19). Verses 1–12 contain a list of the members, and their assignments by lots are detailed in verses 13–19 with verses 12–13 as a transition passage between the two parts. A group called "sanctuary guards" existed when David transported the ark earlier in his reign (1 Chronicles 15:18, 23–24; 16:38, 42; 23:5), and here the Levite gatekeepers were to perform guard duty, including opening the Temple gates in the morning. The gatekeepers were also to manage the temple vessels, including holy utensils, and materials, including flour, wine, spices and oil (9:17–32) as well as to perform 'administrative service on behalf of the king' (2 Chronicles 31:14; 34:13). The lottery (verse 13) determined which family to serve at which gate, so the numbers of family members did not affect the selection process. During the period of return from exile (Ezra 2:42-3) the gatekeepers who were not of levitical rank gradually achieved this status.

=== Verse 1 ===
Concerning the divisions of the gatekeepers: of the Korahites, Meshelemiah the son of Kore, of the sons of Asaph.

- "Meshelemiah": written as "Shelemiah" in verse 14.
- "Asaph": written as "Ebiasaph" in 1 Chronicles 6:37; 9:19.

=== Verses 4–8 ===
^{4} Moreover the sons of Obed-Edom were Shemaiah the firstborn, Jehozabad the second, Joah the third, Sacar the fourth, Nethanel the fifth, ^{5} Ammiel the sixth, Issachar the seventh, Peulthai the eighth; for God blessed him.
^{6} Also to Shemaiah his son were sons born who governed their fathers' houses, because they were men of great ability. ^{7} The sons of Shemaiah were Othni, Rephael, Obed, and Elzabad, whose brothers Elihu and Semachiah were able men.
^{8} All these were of the sons of Obed-Edom, they and their sons and their brethren, able men with strength for the work: sixty-two of Obed-Edom.

- "Obed-Edom" and "Hosah" (1 Chronicles 26:10) had been "porters" or "doorkeepers" ("gatekeepers"), from the time the ark was brought into Jerusalem (1 Chronicles 15:24; 1 Chronicles 16:38).

== Treasurers, regional officials, and judges (26:20–32) ==
Some listed here are also mentioned in 1 Chronicles 23:6-23. The Levites were given board responsibilities such as 'oversight of Israel west of Jordan' and east of Jordan ("the Reubenites, the Gadites, and the half-tribe of Manasseh"; verse 32) as 'officers and judges' (verses 29–32; cf. 23:3-5; 2 Chronicles 17:2; 19:5). The list of treasury officers (verses 20–28) is linked to verses 29–31 as the Izharites and the Hebronites (verse 23) are mentioned in both passages. The record distinguishes between 'the treasuries of the house of God' (verses 20, 22) under the responsibility of the Gershonites and 'the treasuries for the dedicated things' (verses 20,26) under the responsibility of the Kohathites. Shebuel of Amram's family (of Kohathite origin; mentioned in verse 24, but also appears in 23:16; 24:20) seems to overview both treasuries. Unlike the treasuries of the house of God, those of the dedicated things are described in detail (verses 26–28), including 'spoils of war' provided by various important persons in a 'democratic' manner which Chronicles probably take from Numbers 31:48, 52, 54 as a literary source. The wars were fought by David and Saul (vastly recorded in the Books of Samuel, Kings and Chronicles), Samuel (probably referring to 1 Samuel 7:7-14), Abner and Joab (probably those in 2 Samuel 2–4). The administrative duties of Levites (verses 29–32), in addition to their religious roles (cf also 23:4 and 2 Chronicles 19:11) would become especially important during the Maccabean period. The order of these duties is based on David's plans and was partly carried out in post-exilic times, reflecting 'a time in which spiritual and secular elements were closely intertwined and the religious and political claim to Transjordanian territories had not been relinquished', which was important for the Chronicler to include entire region (cf. 2 Chronicles 19).

=== Verses 31–32 ===
^{31} Jeriah was chief of the Hebronites according to the genealogical records of his fathers. In the fortieth year of the reign of David, mighty men of valor were found in the records among the Hebronites at Jazer of Gilead, ^{32} and his brothers, able men, two thousand seven hundred heads of the fathers, to them King David entrusted all matters of God and of the king concerning the Reubenites, the Gadites, and the half-tribe of Manasseh.

- "Jerijah" (1 Chronicles 23:19; 1 Chronicles 24:23) was the leader of the Hebronites and with his brethren were appointed to be the superintendence of the two tribes and a half in the east side of Jordan, whereas "Hashabiah and his brethren" were assigned to the area west of Jordan (verse 30).
- "Fortieth year": David's last year of reign (1 Chronicles 29:27).
- "Jazer of Gilead": is a Merarite city (Joshua 13:25; Joshua 21:39; Numbers 21:32), whereas the Hebronites were Kohathites, so perhaps this should be read as “in the cities of Gilead.”

The distinction of matters related to the king and related to God is only noted in the Chronicles (26:30, 32; 2 Chronicles 19:11) and Ezra 7:26.

== See also ==
- Tabernacle
- Priestly divisions
- Jerusalem
- Solomon's Temple
- Related Bible parts: 1 Samuel 17, 2 Samuel 2, 2 Samuel 3, 2 Samuel 4, 1 Chronicles 6, 1 Chronicles 9, 1 Chronicles 15, 1 Chronicles 23, 1 Chronicles 24, 1 Chronicles 29, 2 Chronicles 19, Ezra 7

== Sources ==
- Ackroyd, Peter R (1993). "Chronicles, Books of". In Metzger, Bruce M; Coogan, Michael D (eds.). The Oxford Companion to the Bible. Oxford University Press. pp. 113–116. ISBN 978-0195046458.
- Bennett, William (2018). The Expositor's Bible: The Books of Chronicles. Litres. ISBN 978-5040825196.
- Coogan, Michael David (2007). Coogan, Michael David; Brettler, Marc Zvi; Newsom, Carol Ann; Perkins, Pheme (eds.). The New Oxford Annotated Bible with the Apocryphal/Deuterocanonical Books: New Revised Standard Version, Issue 48 (Augmented 3rd ed.). Oxford University Press. ISBN 9780195288810.
- Endres, John C. (2012). First and Second Chronicles. Liturgical Press. ISBN 9780814628447.
- Hill, Andrew E. (2003). First and Second Chronicles. Zondervan. ISBN 9780310206101.
- Mabie, Frederick (2017). "I. The Chronicler's Genealogical Survey of All Israel". In Longman III, Tremper; Garland, David E (eds.). 1 and 2 Chronicles. The Expositor's Bible Commentary. Zondervan. pp. 267–308. ISBN 978-0310531814.
- Mathys, H. P. (2007). "14. 1 and 2 Chronicles". In Barton, John; Muddiman, John (eds.). The Oxford Bible Commentary (first (paperback) ed.). Oxford University Press. pp. 267–308. ISBN 978-0199277186.
- Tuell, Steven S. (2012). First and Second Chronicles. Westminster John Knox Press. ISBN 978-0664238650.
- Würthwein, Ernst (1995). The Text of the Old Testament. Translated by Rhodes, Erroll F. Grand Rapids, MI: William B. Eerdmans. ISBN 0-8028-0788-7.
