= 2 Chronicles 9 =

Second Book of Chronicles, chapter 9

- ← chapter 8 chapter 10 →
- The complete Hebrew text of the Books of Chronicles (1st and 2nd Chronicles) in the Leningrad Codex (1008 CE).
- Book: Books of Chronicles
- Category: Ketuvim
- Christian Bible part: Old Testament
- Order in the Christian part: 14

2 Chronicles 9 is the ninth chapter of the Second Book of Chronicles the Old Testament in the Christian Bible or of the second part of the Books of Chronicles in the Hebrew Bible. The book is compiled from older sources by an unknown person or group, designated by modern scholars as "the Chronicler", and had the final shape established in the late fifth or fourth century BCE. This chapter belongs to the section focusing on the kingship of Solomon (2 Chronicles 1 to 9). The focus of this chapter is Solomon's fame and wealth with the visit of the queen of Sheba and the list of his treasures, ending with the report of his death and the history books containing his activities.

== Text ==
This chapter was originally written in the Hebrew language and is divided into 31 verses.

=== Textual witnesses ===
Some early manuscripts containing the text of this chapter in Hebrew are of the Masoretic Text, which includes the Aleppo Codex (10th century) and Codex Leningradensis (1008.

There is also a translation into Koine Greek known as the Septuagint, made in the last few centuries BCE. Extant ancient manuscripts of the Septuagint version include Codex Vaticanus (B; $\mathfrak{G}$^{B}; 4th century), and Codex Alexandrinus (A; $\mathfrak{G}$^{A}; 5th century). (Note: The whole book of 2 Chronicles is missing from the extant Codex Sinaiticus.)

=== Old Testament references ===
- 2 Chronicles 9:1–12: 1 Kings 10:1–13
- 2 Chronicles 9:13–28: 1 Kings 10:14–29
- 2 Chronicles 9:29–31: 1 Kings 11:41–43

== The queen of Sheba's visit (9:1–12) ==
The story of the Queen of Sheba's visit to Jerusalem was almost identical with that in 1 Kings 10 and fits extremely well for international recognition of Judah's rulers in the Chronicles (cf. e.g. 1 Chronicles 14:17).

=== Verse 9 ===
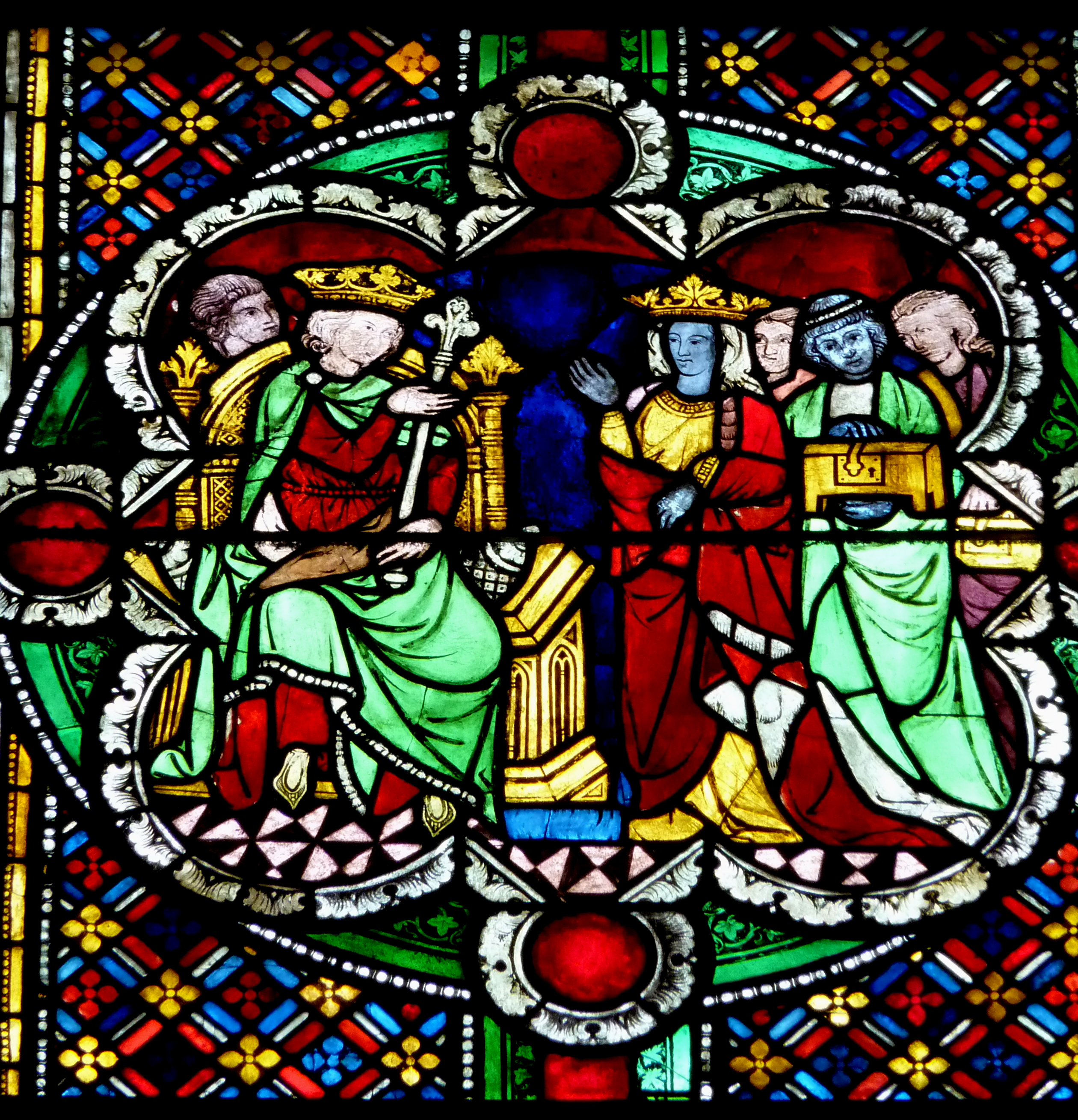
Queen of Sheba and Solomon, around 1280, window now in Cologne Cathedral, Germany.

And she gave the king one hundred and twenty talents of gold, spices in great abundance, and precious stones; there never were any spices such as those the queen of Sheba gave to King Solomon.

- "120 talents": a talent was about 34 kilograms (75 lb), so 120 talents weigh about 4.5 tons or 4 metric tons.
- "Queen of Sheba" (from Hebrew: מַלְכַּת־ שְׁבָא, malkat-šəḇā; Koine Greek: βασίλισσα Σαβὰ in the Septuagint): deduced by most experts to be from an African kingdom centered around the ancient kingdoms of Nubia and Aksum, in present-day Ethiopia, which location name "Sheba" was quite well known in the classical world as Arabia Felix. Around the middle of the first millennium BCE, the Sabaeans were recorded to dwell in the Horn of Africa, the area that later became the realm of Aksum. In the New Testament Gospels, she was referred to as the "queen of the South" (Greek: βασίλισσα νότου, Latin: Regina austri), who "came from the uttermost parts of the earth", i.e. from the extremities of the then known world, to hear the wisdom of Solomon (Mt. 12:42; Lk. 11:31).

== Solomon's wealth (9:13–28) ==
This section with substantial information regarding Solomon's splendor and power largely parallels with 1 Kings 10:14–28a, describing how the promise of unmatched wealth and wisdom (2 Chronicles 1:11–12) was fulfilled in Solomon. Verse 25a corresponds with 1 Kings 5:6, verse 25b with 1 Kings 10:26b, whereas verse 26 includes information recorded in 1 Kings 5:1 and verses 27–28 with 1 Kings 10:27–28. Some materials in 1 Kings 10 with no parallel in this chapter can be found in 2 Chronicles 1:14-17.

== The death of Solomon (9:29–31) ==
The Chronicles report that Solomon enjoyed a peaceful reign of unified Israel kingdom from the beginning to the end ('from first to last'; instead of 'all that he did' in 1 Kings 11:41), omitting any negative information found in other documents (1 Kings 9:11–16; 11:1–38) and also not to present Solomon's wisdom as his most significant quality. Instead of using 'the Book of the Acts of Solomon', the Chronicles use 'the history of the prophet Nathan, and in the prophecy of Ahijah the Shilonite, and in the visions of the seer Iddo concerning Jeroboam son of Nebat' – three prophetic sources just like David (1 Chronicles 29:29) – covering the beginning of Solomon's reign (Nathan, cf. 1 Kings 1), to its end (Ahijah; cf. 1 Kings 11:29), whereas Iddo is mentioned again as a source in 2 Chronicles 12:15 (Rehoboam) and 13:22 (Abijah).

== See also ==
- Ezion-Geber
- Ophir
- Sheba
- Tarshish
- Related Bible parts: Deuteronomy 32, 1 Kings 1, 1 Kings 5, 1 Kings 9, 1 Kings 10, 1 Kings 11, 1 Chronicles 22, 1 Chronicles 29, Matthew 12, Luke 11

== Sources ==
- Ackroyd, Peter R (1993). "Chronicles, Books of". In Metzger, Bruce M; Coogan, Michael D (eds.). The Oxford Companion to the Bible. Oxford University Press. pp. 113–116. ISBN 978-0195046458.
- Bennett, William (2018). The Expositor's Bible: The Books of Chronicles. Litres. ISBN 978-5040825196.
- Coogan, Michael David (2007). Coogan, Michael David; Brettler, Marc Zvi; Newsom, Carol Ann; Perkins, Pheme (eds.). The New Oxford Annotated Bible with the Apocryphal/Deuterocanonical Books: New Revised Standard Version, Issue 48 (Augmented 3rd ed.). Oxford University Press. ISBN 9780195288810.
- Mabie, Frederick (2017). "I. The Chronicler's Genealogical Survey of All Israel". In Longman III, Tremper; Garland, David E (eds.). 1 and 2 Chronicles. The Expositor's Bible Commentary. Zondervan. pp. 267–308. ISBN 978-0310531814.
- Mathys, H. P. (2007). "14. 1 and 2 Chronicles". In Barton, John; Muddiman, John (eds.). The Oxford Bible Commentary (first (paperback) ed.). Oxford University Press. pp. 267–308. ISBN 978-0199277186.
- Würthwein, Ernst (1995). The Text of the Old Testament. Translated by Rhodes, Erroll F. Grand Rapids, MI: William B. Eerdmans. ISBN 0-8028-0788-7.
