= 1 Chronicles 29 =

First Book of Chronicles, chapter 29

- ← chapter 28 2 Chronicles 1 →
- The complete Hebrew text of the Books of Chronicles (1 and 2 Chronicles) in the Leningrad Codex (1008 CE).
- Book: Books of Chronicles
- Category: Ketuvim
- Christian Bible part: Old Testament
- Order in the Christian part: 13

1 Chronicles 29 is the twenty-ninth chapter of the Books of Chronicles in the Hebrew Bible or the final chapter in the First Book of Chronicles in the Old Testament of the Christian Bible. The book is compiled from older sources by an unknown person or group, designated by modern scholars as "the Chronicler", and had the final shape established in late fifth or fourth century BCE. This chapter consists of four parts: the voluntary gifts for the temple (verses 1–9), David's prayer and the people's response (verses 10–20); Solomon's accession to the throne (verses 21–25), and the concluding praise of David's reign (verses 26–30). The whole chapter belongs to the section focusing on the kingship of David (1 Chronicles 9:35 to 29:30), which from chapter 22 to the end does not have parallel in 2 Samuel.

== Text ==
This chapter was originally written in the Hebrew language. It is divided into 30 verses.

=== Textual witnesses ===
Some early manuscripts containing the text of this chapter in Hebrew are of the Masoretic Text tradition, which includes the Aleppo Codex (10th century), and Codex Leningradensis (1008).

Extant manuscripts of a Koine Greek translation known as the Septuagint, made in the last few centuries BCE, include Codex Vaticanus (B; $\mathfrak{G}$^{B}; 4th century), Codex Alexandrinus (A; $\mathfrak{G}$^{A}; 5th century) and Codex Marchalianus (Q; $\mathfrak{G}$^{Q}; 6th century). (Note: The extant Codex Sinaiticus only contains 1 Chronicles 9:27–19:17.)

== Offerings for the Temple (29:1–9) ==
This section records David's collections of materials for the temple construction, which encouraged other leaders of Israel to offer generous ('willing') donation, far more than David's, in parallel to Israel's gifts for the construction of the Tabernacle (Exodus 25:1–7; 35:4–9, 20–29). David contributed to the costs of the temple's construction both as a king (cf. 1 Kings) and as an ordinary believer, with freedom and joy.

== David's farewell prayer and the people's response (29:10–20) ==
The section records David's prayer, beginning with a doxology, continuing with an interpretation of the voluntary donations and concluding with a wish for people not to forget the past and a wish for the future reign of King Solomon. The form of the prayer (cf. 2 Samuel 23:1-7; 1 Kings 2:1-10) follows the final addresses by great leaders in the past: Jacob (Genesis 49:1-28), Moses (Deuteronomy 32:1-47; 33:1-29), Joshua (Joshua 23:1-16; 24:1-28), and Samuel (1 Samuel 12:1-25).

=== Verse 11 ===
Yours, O Lord, is the greatness,
The power and the glory,
The victory and the majesty;
For all that is in heaven and in earth is Yours;
Yours is the kingdom, O Lord,
And You are exalted as head over all.

- "Head": or "ruler"

== Solomon, king of Israel (29:21–25) ==
The ascension of Solomon is reported as smooth and without incident, followed by a public endorsement (for the second time; cf. 1 Chronicles 23:1) of Solomon's enthronement by all people of Israel.

== The close of David’s reign (29:26–30) ==
The summary of an individual king's reign is a standard practice in the books of Kings, with that of David differing from the usual pattern in 1 Kings 2:10-12, but closer to the other kings' concluding formulae in the Chronicles. The Chronicles cite three prophets (with their differing titles) who provide the records of David's reign. David was said to enjoy a productive and respected life, with security and longevity as the marks of divine blessings (2 Chronicles 24:15; Deuteronomy 4:40; 5:16; Isaiah 52:10; 65:17–19).

== See also ==
- Davidic line
- Hebron
- Jerusalem
- Solomon
- Related Bible parts: Exodus 25, Exodus 35, Deuteronomy 4, Deuteronomy 5, Deuteronomy 28, 2 Samuel 23, 1 Kings 1, 1 Chronicles 17, 1 Chronicles 23, 2 Chronicles 24, Isaiah 52, Isaiah 65, Matthew 6:13

== Sources ==
- Ackroyd, Peter R (1993). "Chronicles, Books of". In Metzger, Bruce M; Coogan, Michael D (eds.). The Oxford Companion to the Bible. Oxford University Press. pp. 113–116. ISBN 978-0195046458.
- Bennett, William (2018). The Expositor's Bible: The Books of Chronicles. Litres. ISBN 978-5040825196.
- Coogan, Michael David (2007). Coogan, Michael David; Brettler, Marc Zvi; Newsom, Carol Ann; Perkins, Pheme (eds.). The New Oxford Annotated Bible with the Apocryphal/Deuterocanonical Books: New Revised Standard Version, Issue 48 (Augmented 3rd ed.). Oxford University Press. ISBN 9780195288810.
- Endres, John C. (2012). First and Second Chronicles. Liturgical Press. ISBN 9780814628447.
- Hill, Andrew E. (2003). First and Second Chronicles. Zondervan. ISBN 9780310206101.
- Mabie, Frederick (2017). "I. The Chronicler's Genealogical Survey of All Israel". In Longman III, Tremper; Garland, David E (eds.). 1 and 2 Chronicles. The Expositor's Bible Commentary. Zondervan. pp. 267–308. ISBN 978-0310531814.
- Mathys, H. P. (2007). "14. 1 and 2 Chronicles". In Barton, John; Muddiman, John (eds.). The Oxford Bible Commentary (first (paperback) ed.). Oxford University Press. pp. 267–308. ISBN 978-0199277186.
- Tuell, Steven S. (2012). First and Second Chronicles. Westminster John Knox Press. ISBN 978-0664238650.
- Würthwein, Ernst (1995). The Text of the Old Testament. Translated by Rhodes, Erroll F. Grand Rapids, MI: William B. Eerdmans. ISBN 0-8028-0788-7.
