= Acts 3 =

- ← chapter 2 chapter 4 →
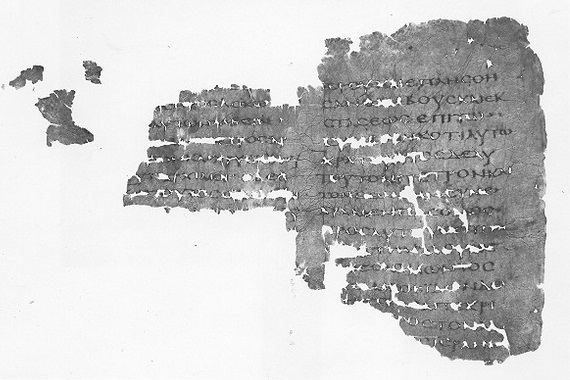
- Acts 3:5–6, 10–12 on Uncial 057 from 4th/5th century
- Book: Acts of the Apostles
- Category: Church history
- Christian Bible part: New Testament
- Order in the Christian part: 5

Acts 3 is the third chapter of the Acts of the Apostles in the New Testament of the Christian Bible. Early Christian tradition affirmed that Luke composed this book as well as the Gospel of Luke. Critical opinion on the tradition was evenly divided at the end of the 20th century. This chapter records the healing of a disabled person by the apostles Peter and John, and Peter's preaching at Solomon's Porch in the Second Temple.

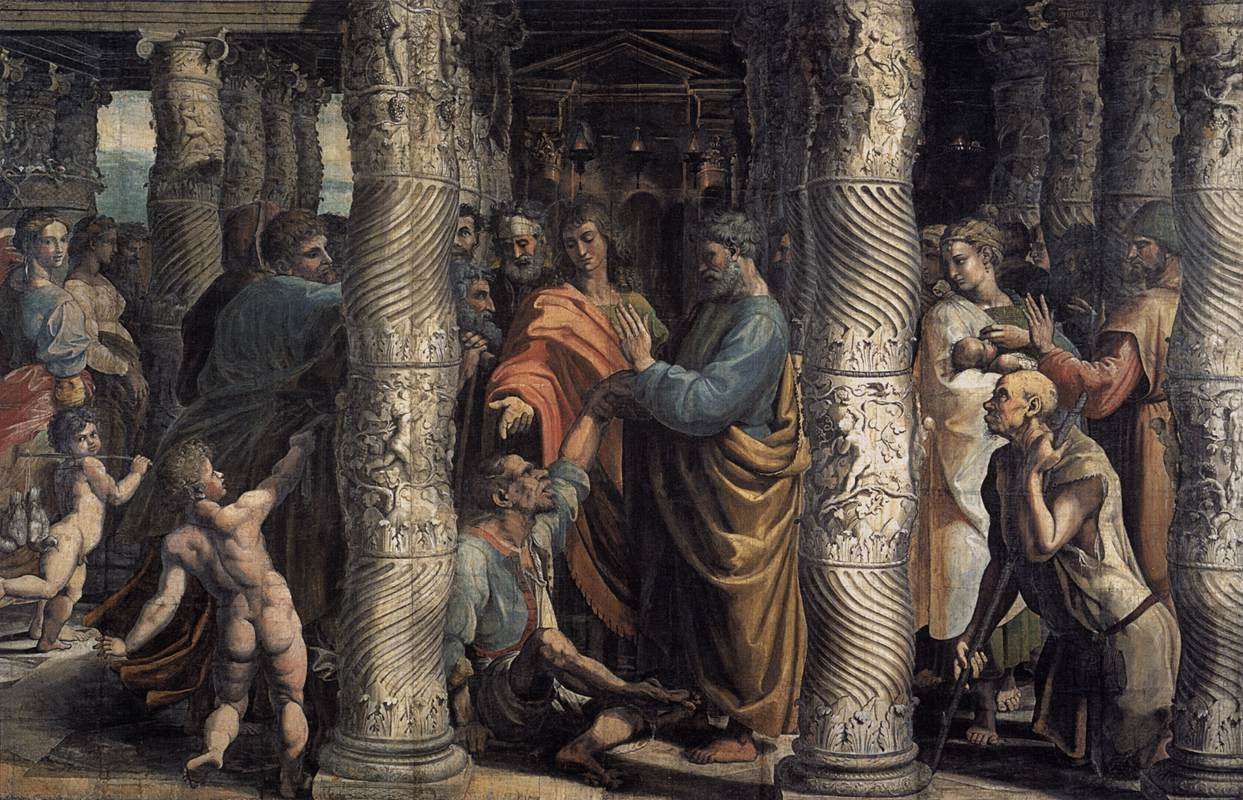
From Raphael's workshop, "Healing of the Lame Man", a cartoon for a tapestry that depicts Peter healing the lame man (Acts 3). The artist used the Solomonic columns in St. Peter's Basilica as models for the columns of the Jewish Temple.

== Text ==
The original text was written in Koine Greek. This chapter is divided into 26 verses.

=== Textual witnesses ===
Some early manuscripts containing the text of this chapter are:

- Papyrus 91 (3rd century; extant verses 1–2)
- Codex Vaticanus (325–350)
- Codex Sinaiticus (330–360)
- Codex Bezae (~400)
- Codex Alexandrinus (400–440)
- Codex Ephraemi Rescriptus (~450)
- Codex Laudianus (~550)

=== Old Testament references ===
- Acts 3:22–23: Deuteronomy 18:15,18,19 and Deuteronomy 7:37
- Acts 3:25: Genesis 12:3, Genesis 22:18; Genesis 26:4; Genesis 28:14

== A lame man is healed (3:1–10) ==
This section gives one detailed account as an example of Luke's earlier note that "the 'apostolic band' has the power to work miracles" (Acts 2:43).

=== Verse 2 ===
And a certain man lame from his mother's womb was carried, whom they laid daily at the gate of the temple which is called Beautiful, to ask alms of them that entered into the temple;

The temple in Jerusalem had several gates, but it is not clear which one might have been called Beautiful. No ancient source mentions the Beautiful Gate, but the Nicanor Gate is probably the best guess. Traditionally the gate is identified with the Shushan Gate but, according to C. K. Barrett, that gate was not a suitable location for a beggar.

=== Verse 3 ===
who, seeing Peter and John about to go into the temple, asked for alms.

In the King James Version, he asks for "an alms", reflecting the singular noun ἐλεημοσύνην (eleēmosunēn) in the Greek text.

=== Verse 4 ===
And fixing his eyes on him, with John, Peter said, "Look at us".

Alexander notes that from this point onwards. Peter leads the action, with John playing a "supporting" role. J. Rawson Lumby suggests that in looking intently at the man, he was able to perceive that he had faith to be healed.

=== Verse 6 ===
Then Peter said, "Silver and gold have I none; but such as I have give I thee: In the name of Jesus Christ of Nazareth rise up and walk".

The healing of the lame man in this chapter is the inspiration of some songs. One such example is the children's song "Silver and Gold Have I None".

=== Verse 7 ===
And he (Peter) took him by the right hand and raised him up; and immediately his feet and ankles were made strong.

Alexander argues that there is a play on words in the phrase "raised him up" (Greek: ηγειρεν αυτον, ēgeiren auton), which is "almost certainly deliberate", referring to both a physical elevation and a transition to "a new way of life".

== No other name (3:11–26) ==
Alexander draws these verses together as indicating the apostles' argument that "no other name" but Jesus' name can account for how this man was healed. They record Peter's second speech (after his speech in Acts 2), which addresses the same two questions as his first: 'What does this mean?' (cf. 2:12) and 'What shall we do?' (cf. 2:37). Acts 4:12 reiterates their contention that salvation comes through "no other name".

=== Verse 11 ===
As he (the man healed) clung to Peter and John, all the people hurried in amazement toward them in the portico called "Solomon’s Portico".

Clinging on to Peter and John may be interpreted as physically holding them, or it may signify that he joined himself to the Apostles more closely as a follower.

=== Verse 17 ===
Yet now, brethren, I know that you did it in ignorance, as did also your rulers.

- "Ignorance" is identified as a "mitigating factor" in the rejection of the Messiah, a mistake of both the crowd (whom Peter called 'brethren') and their rulers. Albert Barnes reasons that Peter "means to say that their offence was mitigated by the fact that they were ignorant that [Jesus] was the Messiah". He adds that the same thing was affirmed by Jesus as he died: "Father, forgive them, for they know not what they do" (Luke 23:34).

=== Verses 22–23 ===
²²For Moses truly said to the fathers, 'The Lord your God will raise up for you a Prophet like me from your brethren. Him you shall hear in all things, whatever He says to you. ²³And it shall be that every soul who will not hear that Prophet shall be utterly destroyed from among the people.’

Cited from Deuteronomy 18:19, linked with Leviticus 23:29, the prophecy contains the term "prophet like [Moses]" as a "biblical typology".

=== Verse 26 ===
To you first, God, having raised up His Servant Jesus, sent Him to bless you, in turning away every one of you from your iniquities.

- "To you first": The offer of blessing from God is universal, but is first offered to the people of Israel; this is also Paul's message (cf. Romans 1:16).

== See also ==
- Jerusalem
- John the Apostle
- Simon Peter
- Solomon
- Related Bible parts: Genesis 22, Genesis 26, Genesis 28, Deuteronomy 18, Acts 2

== Sources ==
- Alexander, Loveday (2007). "62. Acts". In Barton, John; Muddiman, John (eds.). The Oxford Bible Commentary (first (paperback) ed.). Oxford University Press. pp. 1028–1061. ISBN 978-0199277186.
- Coogan, Michael David (2007). Coogan, Michael David; Brettler, Marc Zvi; Newsom, Carol Ann; Perkins, Pheme (eds.). The New Oxford Annotated Bible with the Apocryphal/Deuterocanonical Books: New Revised Standard Version, Issue 48 (Augmented 3rd ed.). Oxford University Press. ISBN 9780195288810.
