= 2 Chronicles 7 =

Second Book of Chronicles, chapter 7

- ← chapter 6 chapter 8 →
- The complete Hebrew text of the Books of Chronicles (1st and 2nd Chronicles) in the Leningrad Codex (1008 CE).
- Book: Books of Chronicles
- Category: Ketuvim
- Christian Bible part: Old Testament
- Order in the Christian part: 14

2 Chronicles 7 is the seventh chapter of the Second Book of Chronicles the Old Testament in the Christian Bible or of the second part of the Books of Chronicles in the Hebrew Bible. The book is compiled from older sources by an unknown person or group, designated by modern scholars as "the Chronicler", and had the final shape established in late fifth or fourth century BCE. This chapter belongs to the section focusing on the kingship of Solomon (2 Chronicles 1 to 9). The focus of this chapter is the conclusion of dedication ceremony and God's covenant for the temple.

== Text ==
This chapter was originally written in the Hebrew language and is divided into 22 verses.

=== Textual witnesses ===
Some early manuscripts containing the text of this chapter in Hebrew are of the Masoretic Text, which includes the Aleppo Codex (10th century) and Codex Leningradensis (1008.

There is also a translation into Koine Greek known as the Septuagint, made in the last few centuries BCE. Extant ancient manuscripts of the Septuagint version include Codex Vaticanus (B; $\mathfrak{G}$^{B}; 4th century), and Codex Alexandrinus (A; $\mathfrak{G}$^{A}; 5th century). (Note: The whole book of 2 Chronicles is missing from the extant Codex Sinaiticus.)

=== Old Testament references ===
- 2 Chronicles 7:1–3: Psalm 136:1–26
- 2 Chronicles 7:4–10: 1 Kings 8:62–66
- 2 Chronicles 7:11–22: 1 Kings 9:1–9

== Fire from heaven (7:1–3) ==
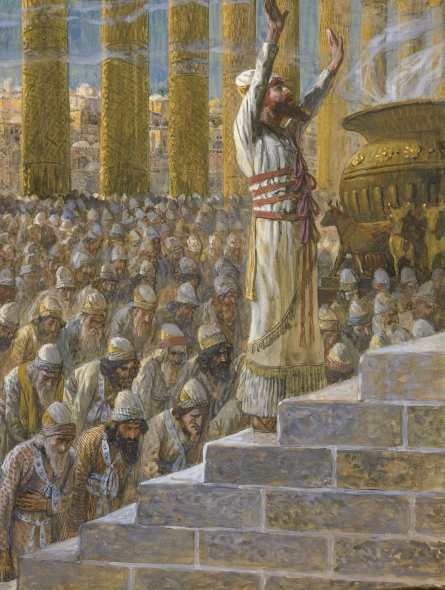
In an artistic representation, King Solomon dedicates the Temple at Jerusalem. (painting by James Tissot or follower, c. 1896–1902)

This section reports God's positive response to the plea in 2 Chronicles 6:41 that He accepted the temple as His own, applying Leviticus 9:22–24 (without the people's blessings by Moses and Aaron in Leviticus 9:23). God's glory took provisional possession of the temple as in 2 Chronicles 5:13–14, but now with an endorsing fire falling from the heavens, which was witnessed by the religious elite as well as all the Israelites, because God's glory does not only fill the temple, but is also above it (cf. Exodus 40:34 for verse 2, which can be rendered as 'and during all this time the glory of YHWH still filled the temple').

=== Verse 1 ===
And when Solomon finished praying, fire came down from the heavens and consumed the burnt offering and sacrifices, and the glory of the Lord filled the temple.

- "Temple": literally, "house"

The 'divine consecration' of the burnt offering and the sacrifices by fire coming down from heaven (not found in 1 Kings 8–9) 'dramatically legitimates' Solomon's Temple as 'an enduring fixture of Israelite life' (cf. Leviticus 9:24; 1 Kings 18:36-39; 1 Chronicles 21:26).

=== Verse 3 ===
And when all the children of Israel saw how the fire came down, and the glory of the Lord upon the house, they bowed themselves with their faces to the ground upon the pavement, and worshipped, and praised the Lord, saying, For he is good; for his mercy endureth for ever.

The song refrain is found in Psalm 136 (cf. 2 Chronicles 5:13; 7:6; 20:21; Ezra 3:11), which became a significant element in the postexilic Temple liturgy.

== Sacrifices of dedication (7:4–10) ==
The celebration of the temple's dedication and the Feast of Tabernacles were two separate feasts, each lasting seven days, for a total of 14 days (clarifying 1 Kings 8:66): the temple dedication took place from the 8th to the 14th of the seventh month, while the Feast of Tabernacles lasted from the 15th until the 21st of the same month with the concluding feast (as in Leviticus 23:36, 39; cf. Numbers 29:35–38; Nehemiah 8:18) is on the 22nd, then Solomon dismissed the festive community on the 23rd, as stated in verse 10, showing a strict adherence to the festal calendar according to Moses' law.

== God's response to Solomon (7:11–22) ==
Verse 11 bridges the previous section to the next showing that Solomon was successful because he behaved in an exemplary manner. God lists four ways in which the Israelites could move Him to action (verse 14): humility, prayer, seeking His face, and turning from wicked ways; all these becoming repeated themes in the following chapters of Chronicles, whereas verses 17–22, a form of theodicy, lays out the explanation for the future collapse of David's monarchy and the destruction of the temple. The unique phrase in verse 18 'a successor to rule over Israel' (instead of 'a successor on the throne of Israel' in Kings 9:5 and also excluding the phrase 'over Israel for ever') parallels Micah 5:1 with messianic undertones, followed by the exclusion of the phrase 'or your children' in verse 19 to invoke the responsibilities of the current generation.

== See also ==
- Ark of the Covenant
- Davidic line
- Tabernacle
- Related Bible parts: Exodus 30, Exodus 26, Leviticus 23, Numbers 26, 1 Kings 6, 1 Kings 7, 1 Kings 8, 1 Kings 18; 2 Kings 16, 1 Chronicles 28, Ezra 3, Psalm 136

== Sources ==
- Ackroyd, Peter R (1993). "Chronicles, Books of". In Metzger, Bruce M; Coogan, Michael D (eds.). The Oxford Companion to the Bible. Oxford University Press. pp. 113–116. ISBN 978-0195046458.
- Bennett, William (2018). The Expositor's Bible: The Books of Chronicles. Litres. ISBN 978-5040825196.
- Coogan, Michael David (2007). Coogan, Michael David; Brettler, Marc Zvi; Newsom, Carol Ann; Perkins, Pheme (eds.). The New Oxford Annotated Bible with the Apocryphal/Deuterocanonical Books: New Revised Standard Version, Issue 48 (Augmented 3rd ed.). Oxford University Press. ISBN 9780195288810.
- Mabie, Frederick (2017). "I. The Chronicler's Genealogical Survey of All Israel". In Longman III, Tremper; Garland, David E (eds.). 1 and 2 Chronicles. The Expositor's Bible Commentary. Zondervan. pp. 267–308. ISBN 978-0310531814.
- Mathys, H. P. (2007). "14. 1 and 2 Chronicles". In Barton, John; Muddiman, John (eds.). The Oxford Bible Commentary (first (paperback) ed.). Oxford University Press. pp. 267–308. ISBN 978-0199277186.
- Würthwein, Ernst (1995). The Text of the Old Testament. Translated by Rhodes, Erroll F. Grand Rapids, MI: William B. Eerdmans. ISBN 0-8028-0788-7.
