= 1 Chronicles 25 =

First Book of Chronicles, chapter 25

- ← chapter 24 chapter 26 →
- The complete Hebrew text of the Books of Chronicles (1 and 2 Chronicles) in the Leningrad Codex (1008 CE).
- Book: Books of Chronicles
- Category: Ketuvim
- Christian Bible part: Old Testament
- Order in the Christian part: 13

1 Chronicles 25 is the twenty-fifth chapter of the Books of Chronicles in the Hebrew Bible or the First Book of Chronicles in the Old Testament of the Christian Bible. The book is compiled from older sources by an unknown person or group, designated by modern scholars as "the Chronicler", and had the final shape established in late fifth or fourth century BCE. This chapter records the organization and departments of Levite temple musicians, from three main families (verses 1–19) and the drawing of lots to allocate individual musicians' duties (verses 20–31). The whole chapter belongs to the section focusing on the kingship of David (1 Chronicles 9:35 to 29:30), which from chapter 22 to the end does not have parallel in 2 Samuel.

== Text ==
This chapter was originally written in the Hebrew language. It is divided into 31 verses.

=== Textual witnesses ===
Some early manuscripts containing the text of this chapter in Hebrew are of the Masoretic Text tradition, which includes the Aleppo Codex (10th century), and Codex Leningradensis (1008).

Extant manuscripts of a Koine Greek translation known as the Septuagint, made in the last few centuries BCE, include Codex Vaticanus (B; $\mathfrak{G}$^{B}; 4th century), Codex Alexandrinus (A; $\mathfrak{G}$^{A}; 5th century) and Codex Marchalianus (Q; $\mathfrak{G}$^{Q}; 6th century). (Note: The extant Codex Sinaiticus only contains 1 Chronicles 9:27–19:17.)

== Three families of musicians (25:1–6) ==
This section details the organization of the temple musicians who strictly belonged to the Levites (1 Chronicles 23:30–31; cf. 1 Chronicles 15:16–24; 16:4–6). There were three main musician families: Asaph, Jeduthun, and Heman, whose members would be organized into divisions. After returning from exile in Babylon occasionally all musicians are regarded as descendants of Asaph (Ezra 2:41; 3:10; Nehemiah 7:44). Nehemiah 11:17 and 1 Chronicles 9:15-16 mention both Asaph and Jeduthun, whereas a 'third tradition' speaks of three musicians comprising Asaph, Heman, and Ethan (1 Chronicles 6:44; 15:17,19). The similar way of writing both names helps the identification of Jeduthun and Ethan. The order of Asaph, Jeduthun, Heman probably reflects an older hierarchy, but the tone in this passage elevates the family of Heman as the largest ('according to the promise of God to exalt him', verse 5). The musician families are introduced with their duties, such as to prophecy (verses 1–3), and instruments, that their singing, playing, and the content of their psalms or music, can be viewed as in 1 Samuel 10:5 and 2 Kings 3:15 as emphasizing the 'close relationship between music and prophecy'. In 2 Chronicles 29:25 David gave an order, which was supported by two prophets (Gad and Nathan), to confirm permanent office of these Levites as temple musicians. Allusions to song and music as a kind of prophecy (verses 1–3; cf. 2 Chronicles 24:19–22) may be related to the tradition of regarding David as a 'prophet who composed the psalms through divine inspiration'.

=== Verse 1 ===
Moreover David and the captains of the host separated to the service of the sons of Asaph, and of Heman, and of Jeduthun, who should prophesy with harps, with psalteries, and with cymbals: and the number of the workmen according to their service was:

- "The captains of the host": is understood as 'those who superintended the order of temple worship' (1 Chronicles 22:17; 1 Chronicles 23:2; 1 Chronicles 24:6; cf. Numbers 4:3; Numbers 8:23). As a part of David's 'governmental apparatus', these officers (also interpreted as the 'leaders of the army') have a say in the organization of the singers. The term "host" or "army" refers to a rank for the Levites, an expression adopted from Numbers 4, for example, whereas 1 Chronicles 15:16 uses 'chiefs of the Levites', who 'select the musicians for their office'.

Asaph, Heman, and Jeduthun belonged respectively to the Gershon, Kohath, and Merarite families (1 Chronicles 6:18–32), which are the three branches of Levites.

=== Verse 5 ===
All these were the sons of Heman the king’s seer in the words of God, to exalt his horn. For God gave Heman fourteen sons and three daughters.

- "Seer": from Hebrew hōzèh, literally "gazer". Gad was called "David’s seer" in 1 Chronicles 21:9, whereas Jeduthun was called "the king’s seer" in 2 Chronicles 35:15 (in LXX: together with Asaph and Heman). The word rendered “seer” in 1 Chronicles 26:28 and 1 Samuel 9:9 is different (Hebrew: rō’èh).
- "Exalt his horn": means "increase his power or influence".

== Twenty-four divisions of musicians (25:7–31) ==
The allocation of 24 divisions of musicians resembles that of the priest, suggesting that 'sacrifice and music are closely intertwined' (cf. 23:29–30), but, unlike the priests, none of the names in the list can be proved to have existed in other texts. Four divisions from the family of Asaph (numbers 1, 3, 5, 7), six from the family of Jeduthun (numbers 2, 4, 8, 10, 12, 14), and 14 from the family of Heman (numbers 6, 9, 11, 13, 15–24). From the result it can be deduced that the lots were not placed separately by family, but all lots were placed in one urn, so after the lots of Asaph and Jeduthun were drawn, only sons of Heman remained. Each of the 24 musical divisions has 12 members (24 x 12 = 288).

=== Verse 8 ===
And they cast lots for their duty, the small as well as the great, the teacher with the student.

- "Cast lots": A lottery is held to determine the 24 divisions (or "courses") of the musicians (or "singers"), as with the priests (1 Chronicles 24:5) and other Levites (1 Chronicles 24:31).
- "The teacher with the student": rendered in LXX as τελείων καὶ μανθανόντων, "the initiated and the learners". “The teacher” can also mean “the skilful” as in 1 Chronicles 25:7 (the same Hebrew word).

=== List of temple musician divisions ===
Verse	Division	English name	Family	Note
9	1st	Joseph	Asaph	
9	2nd	Gedaliah	Jeduthun	
10	3rd	Zaccur	Asaph	
11	4th	Izri	Jeduthun	Zeri (צְרִ֡י) in 1 Chronicles 25:3
12	5th	Nethaniah	Asaph	literally "Nethanyahu" (נְתַנְיָ֔הוּ; cf. 1 Chronicles 25:2 נְתַנְיָ֥ה, "Nethaniah")
13	6th	Jesharelah	Heman	Asarelah (אֲשַׂרְאֵ֖לָה) in 1 Chronicles 25:2
14	7th	Bukkiah	Asaph	
15	8th	Jeshaiah	Jeduthun	
16	9th	Mattaniah	Heman	
17	10th	Shimei	Jeduthun	
18	11th	Azareel	Heman	Uzziel in 1 Chronicles 25:4 (like the king's names Uzziah in 1 Chronicles 3:12 and Azariah in 2 Chronicles 26:1)
19	12th	Hashabiah	Jeduthun	Hashabyahu (חֲשַׁבְיָ֨הוּ) in 1 Chronicles 25:3
20	13th	Shubael	Heman	Shebuel in 1 Chronicles 25:4 (cf. 1 Chronicles 23:16 with 1 Chronicles 24:20)
21	14th	Mattithiah	Jeduthun	Other that Asaph, Jeduthun, and Heman, in this list only the name "Mattithiah" recurs elsewhere (1 Chronicles 15:18, 1 Chronicles 15:21)
22	15th	Jeremoth	Heman	Jerimoth in 1 Chronicles 25:4
23	16th	Hananiah	Heman	literally, "Hananyahu" (חֲנַנְיָ֔הוּ); cf 1 Chronicles 25:4 (חֲנַנְיָ֣ה, "Hananiah")
24	17th	Joshbekashah	Heman	
25	18th	Hanani	Heman	
26	19th	Mallothi	Heman	
27	20th	Eliathah	Heman	Spelled as אֱלִיָּ֔תָה; cf. אֱלִיאָ֤תָה in 1 Chronicles 25:4
28	21st	Hothir	Heman	
29	22nd	Giddalti	Heman	
30	23rd	Mahazioth	Heman	
31	24th	Romamtiezer	Heman	

== See also ==
- Psalms of Asaph
- Psalms of David
- Jerusalem
- Solomon's Temple
- Related Bible parts: Numbers 4, Numbers 8, Numbers 16, Deuteronomy 10, 1 Chronicles 6, 1 Chronicles 23, 1 Chronicles 24, Ezra 10

== Sources ==
- Ackroyd, Peter R (1993). "Chronicles, Books of". In Metzger, Bruce M; Coogan, Michael D (eds.). The Oxford Companion to the Bible. Oxford University Press. pp. 113–116. ISBN 978-0195046458.
- Bennett, William (2018). The Expositor's Bible: The Books of Chronicles. Litres. ISBN 978-5040825196.
- Coogan, Michael David (2007). Coogan, Michael David; Brettler, Marc Zvi; Newsom, Carol Ann; Perkins, Pheme (eds.). The New Oxford Annotated Bible with the Apocryphal/Deuterocanonical Books: New Revised Standard Version, Issue 48 (Augmented 3rd ed.). Oxford University Press. ISBN 9780195288810.
- Endres, John C. (2012). First and Second Chronicles. Liturgical Press. ISBN 9780814628447.
- Hill, Andrew E. (2003). First and Second Chronicles. Zondervan. ISBN 9780310206101.
- Mabie, Frederick (2017). "I. The Chronicler's Genealogical Survey of All Israel". In Longman III, Tremper; Garland, David E (eds.). 1 and 2 Chronicles. The Expositor's Bible Commentary. Zondervan. pp. 267–308. ISBN 978-0310531814.
- Mathys, H. P. (2007). "14. 1 and 2 Chronicles". In Barton, John; Muddiman, John (eds.). The Oxford Bible Commentary (first (paperback) ed.). Oxford University Press. pp. 267–308. ISBN 978-0199277186.
- Tuell, Steven S. (2012). First and Second Chronicles. Westminster John Knox Press. ISBN 978-0664238650.
- Würthwein, Ernst (1995). The Text of the Old Testament. Translated by Rhodes, Erroll F. Grand Rapids, MI: William B. Eerdmans. ISBN 0-8028-0788-7.
