= 1 Chronicles 28 =

First Book of Chronicles, chapter 28

- ← chapter 27 chapter 29 →
- The complete Hebrew text of the Books of Chronicles (1 and 2 Chronicles) in the Leningrad Codex (1008 CE).
- Book: Books of Chronicles
- Category: Ketuvim
- Christian Bible part: Old Testament
- Order in the Christian part: 13

1 Chronicles 28 is the twenty-eighth chapter of the Books of Chronicles in the Hebrew Bible or the First Book of Chronicles in the Old Testament of the Christian Bible. The book is compiled from older sources by an unknown person or group, designated by modern scholars as "the Chronicler", and had the final shape established in late fifth or fourth century BCE. This chapter records David's final speech to all officials of Israel (verses 2–8) and to Solomon (verses 9–10, 20–21), specifically handing him the plans for the temple's construction (verses 11–19). The whole chapter belongs to the section focusing on the kingship of David (1 Chronicles 9:35 to 29:30), which from chapter 22 to the end does not have parallel in 2 Samuel.

== Text ==
This chapter was originally written in the Hebrew language. It is divided into 21 verses.

=== Textual witnesses ===
Some early manuscripts containing the text of this chapter in Hebrew are of the Masoretic Text tradition, which includes the Aleppo Codex (10th century), and Codex Leningradensis (1008).

Extant manuscripts of a Koine Greek translation known as the Septuagint, made in the last few centuries BCE, include Codex Vaticanus (B; $\mathfrak{G}$^{B}; 4th century), Codex Alexandrinus (A; $\mathfrak{G}$^{A}; 5th century) and Codex Marchalianus (Q; $\mathfrak{G}$^{Q}; 6th century). (Note: The extant Codex Sinaiticus only contains 1 Chronicles 9:27–19:17.)

== David's address to the leaders of Israel (28:1–8) ==
This section apparently continues from 1 Chronicles 23:1–2. After organizing the administration of his kingdom, David gathers a 'large national convocation' to prepare the reign of Solomon, to enlist the support of the leaders for the new king and to witness his final messages. Such gathering or assembly is often recorded in the Chronicles (1 Chronicles 13:5; 15:3, 2 Chronicles 5:2-3, 11:1; 20:26) God's promise given through Nathan (1 Chronicles 17) was repeated with some individual variations, along with the comparison of David and Solomon being selected for their reigns (verses 4–5) to the system of drawing lots, pointing to YHWH as the active force in creating an eternal kingdom (verses 7–8).

== David delivered the plan of the temple to Solomon (28:9–21) ==
David addressed Solomon briefly in verses 9–10 with an 'adapted tone of a Deuteronomistic theologoumenon', calling his son to serve YHWH with single (undivided) mind and willing heart. In verses 11–19, David transferred to Solomon his plans for the temple's construction, its materials, and all matters related to it, based on God's plans given to Moses in Exodus 25–31. It also resembles the plans of the new temple's construction shown to Ezekiel (Ezekiel 40–44). Then, in verses 20–21, David reminded Solomon of God's presence together with the willing support of the priests, the Levites, and the entire population, that provide an ideal condition for executing the construction plan.

=== Verse 20 ===
And David said to Solomon his son, Be strong and of good courage, and do it: fear not, nor be dismayed: for the Lord God, even my God, will be with thee; he will not fail thee, nor forsake thee, until thou hast finished all the work for the service of the house of the Lord.

The transitional message from David to Solomon recalls the one from Moses to Joshua, especially for the phrase "be strong and of good courage" (Deuteronomy 31:7; 31:23; Joshua 1:6–18).

== See also ==
- Davidic line
- Jerusalem
- Solomon's Temple
- Tabernacle
- Related Bible parts: Exodus 25, Deuteronomy 4, Deuteronomy 28, Deuteronomy 30, Deuteronomy 31, Joshua 1, 1 Chronicles 17, 1 Chronicles 23

== Sources ==
- Ackroyd, Peter R (1993). "Chronicles, Books of". In Metzger, Bruce M; Coogan, Michael D (eds.). The Oxford Companion to the Bible. Oxford University Press. pp. 113–116. ISBN 978-0195046458.
- Bennett, William (2018). The Expositor's Bible: The Books of Chronicles. Litres. ISBN 978-5040825196.
- Coogan, Michael David (2007). Coogan, Michael David; Brettler, Marc Zvi; Newsom, Carol Ann; Perkins, Pheme (eds.). The New Oxford Annotated Bible with the Apocryphal/Deuterocanonical Books: New Revised Standard Version, Issue 48 (Augmented 3rd ed.). Oxford University Press. ISBN 9780195288810.
- Endres, John C. (2012). First and Second Chronicles. Liturgical Press. ISBN 9780814628447.
- Hill, Andrew E. (2003). First and Second Chronicles. Zondervan. ISBN 9780310206101.
- Mabie, Frederick (2017). "I. The Chronicler's Genealogical Survey of All Israel". In Longman III, Tremper; Garland, David E (eds.). 1 and 2 Chronicles. The Expositor's Bible Commentary. Zondervan. pp. 267–308. ISBN 978-0310531814.
- Mathys, H. P. (2007). "14. 1 and 2 Chronicles". In Barton, John; Muddiman, John (eds.). The Oxford Bible Commentary (first (paperback) ed.). Oxford University Press. pp. 267–308. ISBN 978-0199277186.
- Tuell, Steven S. (2012). First and Second Chronicles. Westminster John Knox Press. ISBN 978-0664238650.
- Würthwein, Ernst (1995). The Text of the Old Testament. Translated by Rhodes, Erroll F. Grand Rapids, MI: William B. Eerdmans. ISBN 0-8028-0788-7.
