= 1 Chronicles 18 =

First Book of Chronicles, chapter 18

- ← chapter 17 chapter 19 →
- The complete Hebrew text of the Books of Chronicles (1 and 2 Chronicles) in the Leningrad Codex (1008 CE).
- Book: Books of Chronicles
- Category: Ketuvim
- Christian Bible part: Old Testament
- Order in the Christian part: 13

1 Chronicles 18 is the eighteenth chapter of the Books of Chronicles in the Hebrew Bible or the First Book of Chronicles in the Old Testament of the Christian Bible. The book is compiled from older sources by an unknown person or group, designated by modern scholars as "the Chronicler", and had the final shape established in late fifth or fourth century BCE. This chapter records the account of David's wars against the neighboring nations and a list of his executive. The whole chapter belongs to the section focusing on the kingship of David (1 Chronicles 9:35 to 29:30).

== Text ==
This chapter was originally written in the Hebrew language. It is divided into 17 verses.

=== Textual witnesses ===
Some early manuscripts containing the text of this chapter in Hebrew are of the Masoretic Text tradition, which includes the Aleppo Codex (10th century), and Codex Leningradensis (1008).

There is also a translation into Koine Greek known as the Septuagint, made in the last few centuries BCE. Extant ancient manuscripts of the Septuagint version include Codex Vaticanus (B; $\mathfrak{G}$^{B}; 4th century), Codex Sinaiticus (S; BHK: $\mathfrak{G}$^{S}; 4th century), Codex Alexandrinus (A; $\mathfrak{G}$^{A}; 5th century) and Codex Marchalianus (Q; $\mathfrak{G}$^{Q}; 6th century).

=== Old Testament references ===
- 1 Chronicles 18:1–13: 2 Samuel 8:1–14; Psalm 60:1–12.
- 1 Chronicles 18:14–17:2 Samuel 8:15–18.

== David conquers the neighboring nations (18:1–13) ==
This section is a summary as well as interpretation of 2 Samuel 8:1–18, forming a single unified content. The condensation of multiple wars into one narrative provides the impression of David as a warrior, which would disqualified him from the task of building the temple because this requires peace (cf. Deuteronomy 12). David was successful in his wars against the Philistines to the west (verse 1; 1 Chronicles 20:4–8), against Edom to the southeast (verses 12–13), against Moab (verse 2) and Ammon (1 Chronicles 19:1–19; 20:1–3) to the east and against a number of Aramean kings to the northeast (verses 3–8; 1 Chronicles 19:6–19), as a fulfillment of Nathan's prophecy that David would subjugate all his enemies.

=== Verse 4 ===
And David took from him a thousand chariots, and seven thousand horsemen, and twenty thousand footmen: David also houghed all the chariot horses, but reserved of them an hundred chariots.

- "Seven thousand horsemen": 2 Samuel 8:4 notes "seven hundred horsemen" (KJV; NKJV). The number was probably multiplied by ten by the Chronicler (cf. 1 Chronicles 19:18), or the Chronicler notes the final number of killed horsemen when David 'established his power by the River Euphrates' (1 Chronicles 18:3) whereas the number in 2 Samuel 8:4 was when David initially 'recover his border at the River Euphrates' (2 Samuel 8:3).
- "Houghed": or "hamstrung" (NKJV); "crippled"

=== Verse 12 ===
And Abishai, the son of Zeruiah, killed 18,000 Edomites in the Valley of Salt.

- "Abishai, the son of Zeruiah": David's nephew, the eldest son of David's sister, Zeruiah. His name means "father of the gift". He was the commander and "most honoured" of the second rank of David's officers, below the three "mighty men". The parallel text of 2 Samuel 8:13 attributes Abishai's achievement to David. In the title of Psalm 60, Joab, Abishai's brother, got the credit for killing 12,000 Edomites at the same place, suggesting the probability of Abishai commanding the battle, while Joab completed the conquest of the country (cf. 1 Kings 11:16).
- "Valley of Salt": located in Edom, also the place of the achievement of Amaziah (1 Kings 11:14–17; 2 Kings 14:7; 2 Chronicles 25:11), who proceeded with ten thousand prisoners to 'precipitate them down the cliff', i.e. Petra (הַסֶּלַע; 2 Chronicles 25:12). The word "valley" here is גֵּיא (Psalm 23:4), signifying "ravine", not עֵמֶק which is more generic.

== David’s officials (18:14–17) ==
This passage contains a list of David's highest officers after the wars, because of the significant role of military ranks during the conquests. It reflects the growth of bureaucracy accompanying the expansion of the kingdom.

=== Verse 17 ===
Benaiah the son of Jehoiada was over the Cherethites and the Pelethites; and David’s sons were chief ministers at the king’s side.

- "Chief ministers at the king’s side": from Hebrew הראשנים ליד המלך, hā-ri-šō-nîm lə-yaḏ ha-me-leḵ, literally "the_first_ ones at_the_hand of_the_king." The term clarifies the use of the word "priests" in the parallel text of 2 Samuel 8:18 which allows different interpretations. Here it means that 'David employs his sons as high-ranking officials in his cabinet' (not as 'priests' for worship services), a practice that was also performed by at least other two kings (2 Chronicles 11:22–23; 21:3).

== See also ==
- David's Mighty Warriors
- House of David
- Jerusalem
- Solomon
- Related Bible parts: Exodus 26, Numbers 4, 1 Kings 4, 2 Samuel 8, 1 Chronicles 22, 2 Chronicles 11, 2 Chronicles 21, Psalm 60

== Sources ==
- Ackroyd, Peter R (1993). "Chronicles, Books of". In Metzger, Bruce M; Coogan, Michael D (eds.). The Oxford Companion to the Bible. Oxford University Press. pp. 113–116. ISBN 978-0195046458.
- Bennett, William (2018). The Expositor's Bible: The Books of Chronicles. Litres. ISBN 978-5040825196.
- Coogan, Michael David (2007). Coogan, Michael David; Brettler, Marc Zvi; Newsom, Carol Ann; Perkins, Pheme (eds.). The New Oxford Annotated Bible with the Apocryphal/Deuterocanonical Books: New Revised Standard Version, Issue 48 (Augmented 3rd ed.). Oxford University Press. ISBN 9780195288810.
- Endres, John C. (2012). First and Second Chronicles. Liturgical Press. ISBN 9780814628447.
- Hill, Andrew E. (2003). First and Second Chronicles. Zondervan. ISBN 9780310206101.
- Mabie, Frederick (2017). "I. The Chronicler's Genealogical Survey of All Israel". In Longman III, Tremper; Garland, David E (eds.). 1 and 2 Chronicles. The Expositor's Bible Commentary. Zondervan. pp. 267–308. ISBN 978-0310531814.
- Mathys, H. P. (2007). "14. 1 and 2 Chronicles". In Barton, John; Muddiman, John (eds.). The Oxford Bible Commentary (first (paperback) ed.). Oxford University Press. pp. 267–308. ISBN 978-0199277186.
- Tuell, Steven S. (2012). First and Second Chronicles. Westminster John Knox Press. ISBN 978-0664238650.
- Würthwein, Ernst (1995). The Text of the Old Testament. Translated by Rhodes, Erroll F. Grand Rapids, MI: William B. Eerdmans. ISBN 0-8028-0788-7.
