= 1 Kings 9 =

1 Kings, chapter 9

- ← chapter 8 chapter 10 →
- The pages containing the Books of Kings (1 & 2 Kings) Leningrad Codex (1008 CE).
- Book: First book of Kings
- Hebrew Bible part: Nevi'im
- Order in the Hebrew part: 4
- Category: Former Prophets
- Christian Bible part: Old Testament
- Order in the Christian part: 11

1 Kings 9 is the ninth chapter of the Books of Kings in the Hebrew Bible or the First Book of Kings in the Old Testament of the Christian Bible. The book is a compilation of various annals recording the acts of the kings of Israel and Judah by a Deuteronomic compiler in the seventh century BCE, with a supplement added in the sixth century BCE. This chapter belongs to the section focusing on the reign of Solomon over the unified kingdom of Judah and Israel (1 Kings 1 to 11). The focus of this chapter is Solomon's achievements.

== Text ==
This chapter was originally written in the Hebrew language and since the 16th century is divided into 28 verses.

=== Textual witnesses ===
Some early manuscripts containing the text of this chapter in Hebrew are of the Masoretic Text tradition, which includes the Codex Cairensis (895), Aleppo Codex (10th century), and Codex Leningradensis (1008).

There is also a translation into Koine Greek known as the Septuagint, made in the last few centuries BCE. Extant ancient manuscripts of the Septuagint version include Codex Vaticanus (B; $\mathfrak{G}$^{B}; 4th century) and Codex Alexandrinus (A; $\mathfrak{G}$^{A}; 5th century). (Note: The whole book of 1 Kings is missing from the extant Codex Sinaiticus.)

=== Old Testament references ===
- 1 Kings 9:1–9: 2 Chronicles 7:11–22
- 1 Kings 9:10–28: 2 Chronicles 8:1–18

== God's response to Solomon (9:1–9) ==
With the completion of the Temple, God did not need to appear to Solomon in Gibeon (verse 2) but in Jerusalem, assuring Solomon of the continuation of his dynasty and the temple, as long as God's laws were kept. The destruction of the Temple and the loss of land are predicted here, as well as the possibility of return, so this section contains two things: 'an explanation for woe and an offer of salvation'.

== The tribute to Tyre (9:10–14) ==
Several times 1 Kings 9–10 overlaps with 1 Kings 3:1–4:34, bracketing the construction of the temple. After paying Hiram I of Tyre with agricultural products (1 Kings 5:25), Solomon gave a strip of land in Galilee (at the Bay of Akko), but Hiram was not satisfied with this gift. However, in 2 Chronicles 8:2 it is asserted that Hiram also gave Solomon some cities as a present.

=== Verse 14 ===
Then Hiram sent the king one hundred and twenty talents of gold.

- "120 talents": about 4 1/2 tons, or 4 metric tons. One talent was about 75 pounds or 34 kilograms.

== Construction of towns and forced labor (9:15–28) ==
This section parallels the narrative in 1 Kings 5:13–18, emphasizing that Israelites were not employed as forced labor, but 'only' Canaanites, for the construction of various cities outside Jerusalem. Currently, there are archaeological excavation of the cities in the list, in particular of Gezer, Megiddo, and Hazor. In Jerusalem, Solomon expanded the construction of 'Millo' (verse 15), a term which is probably related to the meaning of 'to fill', referring to a substructure designed to secure the sloping terrain of the palace grounds (cf 2 Samuel 5:9; 1 Kings 11:27; 2 Kings 12:20). Pharaoh's daughter (verse 16) moved to her own palace (verse 24). Solomon's triannual sacrificial feasts at the temple was mentioned in verse 25, followed by a report of Solomon's shipping expedition from Red Sea (or 'Reed Sea, cf. Exodus 14), to Ophir, a place that could be near Aden or on the Horn of Africa.

=== Verse 15 ===
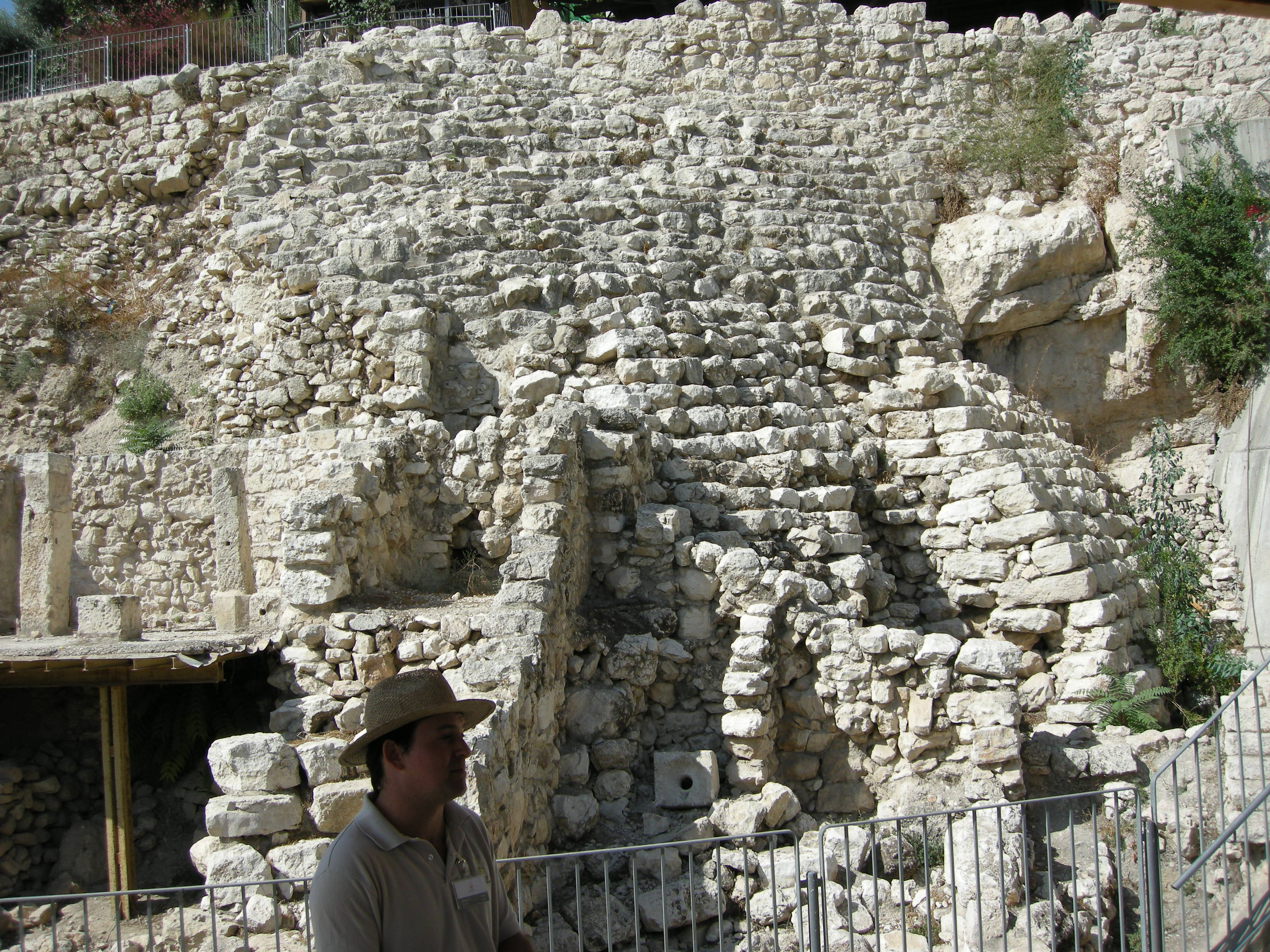
Stepped stone structure/millo with the House of Ahiel to the left

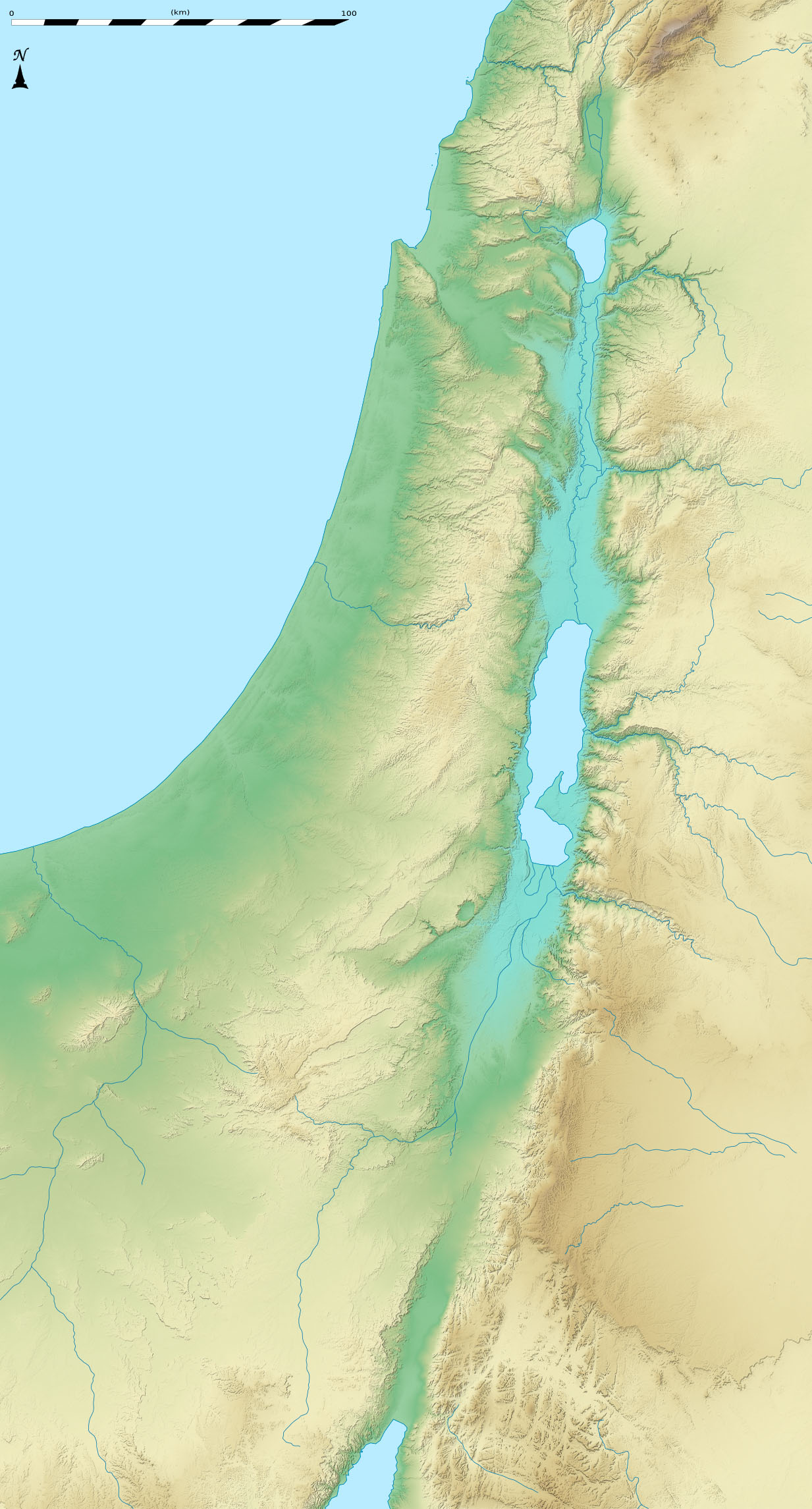
Cities fortified by Solomon.

And this is the account of the forced labor that King Solomon drafted to build the house of the Lord and his own house and the Millo and the wall of Jerusalem and Hazor and Megiddo and Gezer

- "Millo" (Hebrew: המלוא): a structure in Jerusalem first mentioned as a part of the city of David in 2 Samuel 5:9 (parallels in 1 Chronicles 11:8), and in the Books of Kings (this verse), previously seeming to have been a rampart built by the Jebusites prior to Jerusalem's being conquered by the Israelites.
- "Hazor" (Hebrew: תל חצור), also Chatsôr (Hebrew: חָצוֹר), translated in LXX as Hasōr (Ancient Greek: Άσώρ) and Tell el-Qedah (Arabic: تل القدح): now an archaeological tell in Israel, Upper Galilee, north of the Sea of Galilee, in the northern Korazim Plateau.
- "Megiddo" ("Tel Megiddo" (Hebrew: תל מגידו; Arabic: مجیدو, Tell al-Mutesellim, lit. "Mound of the Governor"; Greek: Μεγιδδώ, Megiddo): now a tell (archaeological mound), situated in northern Israel near Kibbutz Megiddo, about 30 km south-east of Haifa.
- "Gezer": now Tel Gezer; Hebrew: גֶּזֶר), in Arabic: تل الجزر – Tell Jezar or Tell el-Jezari, an archaeological site in the foothills of the Judaean Mountains at the border of the Shfela region roughly midway between Jerusalem and Tel Aviv.

== See also ==
- Cabul
- Canaanites
- Children of Israel
- Elath
- Ezion-Geber
- Galilee
- Israel
- Jerusalem
- Millo
- Pharaoh's Daughter
- Solomon's Temple
- Tyre
- Related Bible parts: Leviticus 26, Deuteronomy 28, 2 Samuel 7, 1 Kings 7, 1 Kings 8, 2 Chronicles 7, 2 Chronicles 8

== Sources ==
- Collins, John J. (2014). "Chapter 14: 1 Kings 12 – 2 Kings 25". Introduction to the Hebrew Scriptures. Fortress Press. pp. 277–296. ISBN 978-1451469233.
- Coogan, Michael David (2007). Coogan, Michael David; Brettler, Marc Zvi; Newsom, Carol Ann; Perkins, Pheme (eds.). The New Oxford Annotated Bible with the Apocryphal/Deuterocanonical Books: New Revised Standard Version, Issue 48 (Augmented 3rd ed.). Oxford University Press. ISBN 978-0195288810.
- Dietrich, Walter (2007). "13. 1 and 2 Kings". In Barton, John; Muddiman, John (eds.). The Oxford Bible Commentary (first (paperback) ed.). Oxford University Press. pp. 232–266. ISBN 978-0199277186.
- Halley, Henry H. (1965). Halley's Bible Handbook: an abbreviated Bible commentary (24th (revised) ed.). Zondervan Publishing House. ISBN 0-310-25720-4.
- Hayes, Christine (2015). Introduction to the Bible. Yale University Press. ISBN 978-0300188271.
- Leithart, Peter J. (2006). 1 & 2 Kings. Brazos Theological Commentary on the Bible. Brazos Press. ISBN 978-1587431258.
- McKane, William (1993). "Kings, Book of". In Metzger, Bruce M; Coogan, Michael D (eds.). The Oxford Companion to the Bible. Oxford University Press. pp. 409–413. ISBN 978-0195046458.
- Metzger, Bruce M; Coogan, Michael D, eds. (1993). The Oxford Companion to the Bible. Oxford University Press. ISBN 978-0195046458.
- Würthwein, Ernst (1995). The Text of the Old Testament. Translated by Rhodes, Erroll F. Grand Rapids, MI: Wm. B. Eerdmans. ISBN 0-8028-0788-7.
