= 1 Chronicles 19 =

First Book of Chronicles, chapter 19

- ← chapter 18 chapter 20 →
- The complete Hebrew text of the Books of Chronicles (1 and 2 Chronicles) in the Leningrad Codex (1008 CE).
- Book: Books of Chronicles
- Category: Ketuvim
- Christian Bible part: Old Testament
- Order in the Christian part: 13

1 Chronicles 19 is the nineteenth chapter of the Books of Chronicles in the Hebrew Bible or the First Book of Chronicles in the Old Testament of the Christian Bible. The book is compiled from older sources by an unknown person or group, designated by modern scholars as "the Chronicler", and had the final shape established in late fifth or fourth century BCE. This chapter records the account of David's wars against the neighboring nations, especially the Ammonites and the Arameans. The whole chapter belongs to the section focusing on the kingship of David (1 Chronicles 9:35 to 29:30).

== Text ==
This chapter was originally written in the Hebrew language. It is divided into 19 verses.

=== Textual witnesses ===
Some early manuscripts containing the text of this chapter in Hebrew are of the Masoretic Text tradition, which includes the Aleppo Codex (10th century), and Codex Leningradensis (1008).

There is also a translation into Koine Greek known as the Septuagint, made in the last few centuries BCE, which extant ancient manuscripts include Codex Vaticanus (B; $\mathfrak{G}$^{B}; 4th century), Codex Sinaiticus (S; BHK: $\mathfrak{G}$^{S}; 4th century (Note: The extant Codex Sinaiticus only contains 1 Chronicles 9:27–19:17.)), Codex Alexandrinus (A; $\mathfrak{G}$^{A}; 5th century) and Codex Marchalianus (Q; $\mathfrak{G}$^{Q}; 6th century).

=== Old Testament references ===
- 1 Chronicles 19:1–9: 2 Samuel 10:1–8
- 1 Chronicles 19:10–19:2 Samuel 10:9–19.

== David's messengers disgraced (19:1–9) ==
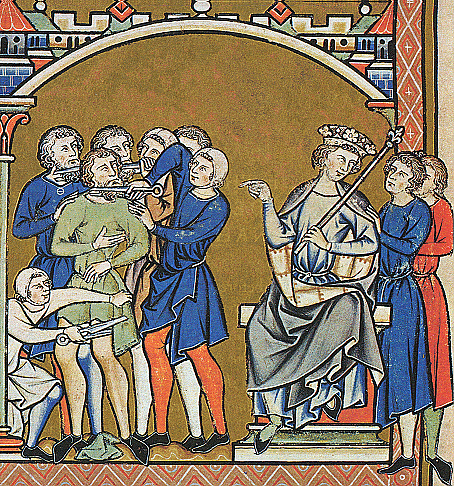
Illustration from the Morgan Bible depicting Hanun humiliating David's ambassadors.

This section a part of the accounts largely corresponding with 2 Samuel 10:1–11:1; 12:26–31, omitting the episode of David, Bathsheba and Uriah the Hittite and 2 Samuel 12:27–29. The death of a king, such as Nahash, the Ammonite, could signal then end of international arrangements with other kingdoms, so David wanted to confirm a good relationship with Nahash's successor, Hanun, but David's successive victories against the Philistines, Moabites, Edomites, and Arameans, made Hanun's counselors suspicious (verse 3). 1 Chronicles 19:4-8 and 2 Samuel 10:4-7 have a parallel in the Qumran (Dead Sea Scrolls) text (4Q51; 4Q Samuel^{a} or 4QSam^{a}, dates from c. 200 BCE), which shows that the 'relationship between Samuel and Chronicles was not one of unilateral or unambiguous independence', with distinctive differences such as the spelling of "David" in the books of Samuel (דָוִ֖ד) differs from that in the Chronicles and 4Q51 (דָּוִ֑יד) as well as some details in numbers.

=== Verse 6 ===
When the Ammonites saw that they had become a stench to David, Hanun and the Ammonites sent one thousand talents of silver to hire chariots and horsemen from Aram Naharaim, Aram Maakah, and Zobah.

- "Become a stench": that is "made themselves odious" (KJV) or "disgusting".
- "Talents": literally "kikkar", a measurement of weight. One talent was about 34 kilograms (75 lb), so 1000 talents was about 34 metric tons (33 long tons; 37 short tons). The sum paid by the Ammonites (1,000 talents of silver, cf. 2 Chronicles 25:6) is mentioned only in the Chronicles which often note monetary matters.
- "Aram-Naharaim": that is "Mesopotamia" (KJV) is listed here instead of Aram Beth-rehob in 2 Samuel 10:6, perhaps because it was no longer existed at the Chronicler's time, as the Chronicler also excludes "Tob".
- "Zobah": written as "Zoba" in 2 Samuel 10:6.

=== Verse 7 ===
So they hired thirty and two thousand chariots, and the king of Maachah and his people; who came and pitched before Medeba. And the children of Ammon gathered themselves together from their cities, and came to battle.

- "Medeba": located c. 30 kilometres (19 mi) south-southwest of Rabbah (modern Amman), the capital of the Ammonites; not mention in 2 Samuel.

== David defeated the Ammonites and Arameans (19:10–19) ==
This passage parallels 2 Samuel 10:9–19 with a few differences. The victory of David's army against the Arameans (Syrians) left the Ammonites isolated from their allies.

=== Verse 18 ===
But the Arameans fled before Israel, and David killed seven thousand chariot drivers and forty thousand infantry men of the Arameans, and killed Shophak, the commander of the army.

- "7000 chariot drivers": The Chronicler multiplies the number of chariots by ten (cf. 1 Chronicles 18:4) in relation to "700 chariots" in 2 Samuel 10:18.
- "40,000 infantry men": or "40,000 foot soldiers"; written as "40,000 horsemen" in 2 Samuel 10:18.
- "Shophak": spelled as "Shobach" in 2 Samuel 10:18.

== See also ==
- David's Mighty Warriors
- House of David
- Jerusalem
- Zeruiah
- Related Bible parts: 2 Samuel 10, 2 Samuel 11, 1 Chronicles 20

== Sources ==
- Ackroyd, Peter R (1993). "Chronicles, Books of". In Metzger, Bruce M; Coogan, Michael D (eds.). The Oxford Companion to the Bible. Oxford University Press. pp. 113–116. ISBN 978-0195046458.
- Bennett, William (2018). The Expositor's Bible: The Books of Chronicles. Litres. ISBN 978-5040825196.
- Coogan, Michael David (2007). Coogan, Michael David; Brettler, Marc Zvi; Newsom, Carol Ann; Perkins, Pheme (eds.). The New Oxford Annotated Bible with the Apocryphal/Deuterocanonical Books: New Revised Standard Version, Issue 48 (Augmented 3rd ed.). Oxford University Press. ISBN 9780195288810.
- Endres, John C. (2012). First and Second Chronicles. Liturgical Press. ISBN 9780814628447.
- Hill, Andrew E. (2003). First and Second Chronicles. Zondervan. ISBN 9780310206101.
- Mabie, Frederick (2017). "I. The Chronicler's Genealogical Survey of All Israel". In Longman III, Tremper; Garland, David E (eds.). 1 and 2 Chronicles. The Expositor's Bible Commentary. Zondervan. pp. 267–308. ISBN 978-0310531814.
- Mathys, H. P. (2007). "14. 1 and 2 Chronicles". In Barton, John; Muddiman, John (eds.). The Oxford Bible Commentary (first (paperback) ed.). Oxford University Press. pp. 267–308. ISBN 978-0199277186.
- Tuell, Steven S. (2012). First and Second Chronicles. Westminster John Knox Press. ISBN 978-0664238650.
- Würthwein, Ernst (1995). The Text of the Old Testament. Translated by Rhodes, Erroll F. Grand Rapids, MI: William B. Eerdmans. ISBN 0-8028-0788-7.
