= Genesis 37 =

Genesis 37 may refer to:

- Vayeshev, the Jewish parashah which includes chapter 37 of the Book of Genesis
- Joseph, whose story commences in this chapter
