= 1 Kings 10 =

1 Kings, chapter 10

- ← chapter 9 chapter 11 →
- The pages containing the Books of Kings (1 & 2 Kings) Leningrad Codex (1008 CE).
- Book: First book of Kings
- Hebrew Bible part: Nevi'im
- Order in the Hebrew part: 4
- Category: Former Prophets
- Christian Bible part: Old Testament
- Order in the Christian part: 11

1 Kings 10 is the tenth chapter of the Books of Kings in the Hebrew Bible or the First Book of Kings in the Old Testament of the Christian Bible. The book is a compilation of various annals recording the acts of the kings of Israel and Judah by a Deuteronomic compiler in the seventh century BCE, with a supplement added in the sixth century BCE. This chapter belongs to the section focusing on the reign of Solomon over the unified kingdom of Judah and Israel (1 Kings 1 to 11). The focus of this chapter is the Solomon's achievements.

== Text ==
This chapter was originally written in the Hebrew language and since the 16th century is divided into 29 verses.

=== Textual witnesses ===
Some early manuscripts containing the text of this chapter in Hebrew are of the Masoretic Text tradition, which includes the Codex Cairensis (895), Aleppo Codex (10th century), and Codex Leningradensis (1008).

There is also a translation into Koine Greek known as the Septuagint, made in the last few centuries BCE. Extant ancient manuscripts of the Septuagint version include Codex Vaticanus (B; $\mathfrak{G}$^{B}; 4th century) and Codex Alexandrinus (A; $\mathfrak{G}$^{A}; 5th century). (Note: The whole book of 1 Kings is missing from the extant Codex Sinaiticus.)

=== Old Testament references ===
- 1 Kings 10:1–13: 2 Chronicles 9:1–12
- 1 Kings 10:14–29: 2 Chronicles 1:14–17; 2 Chronicles 9:13–28

== The visit of the Queen of Sheba (10:1–13) ==
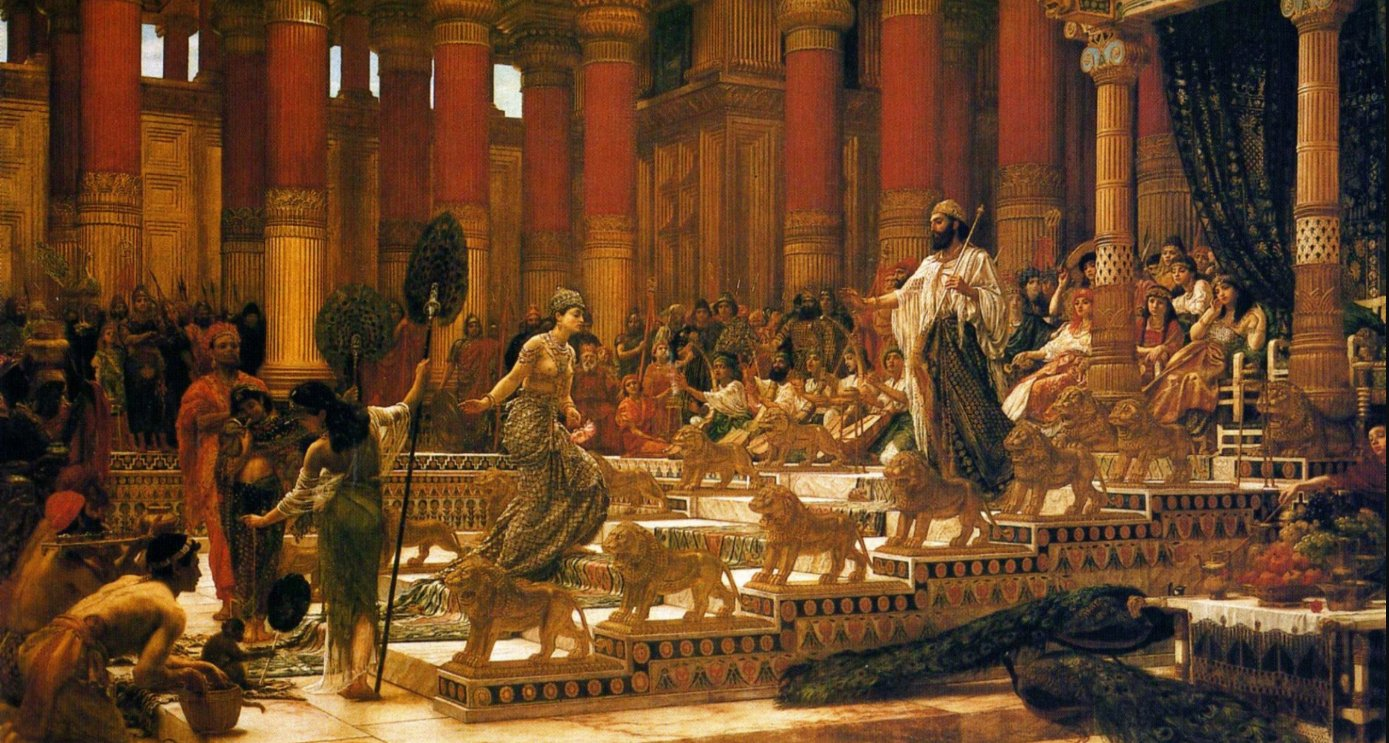
Painting depicts visit of the Queen of Sheba to the court of King Solomon of Jerusalem. The Visit of the Queen of Sheba to King Solomon, by Edward Poynter (1890)

This story essentially displays Solomon's wisdom by showing a noble and wise ruler deeply impressed by him ('there was no more spirit in her' or "breathless", verse 5), with 'great spiritual and even political after-effects all the way to Ethiopia'. The keyword of this passage is "hear", used twice in the verse 1 (literally, "...the queen of Sheba heard the hearing of Solomon...") and later (verses 6, 7, 8, 24) of how the world "hear" of Solomon, a king with "hearing heart" (1 Kings 3:9). The beautiful order of Solomon's table is described in a chiastic structure, framed by "houses" of Solomon and YHWH (verses 4–5; cf. 1 Kings 6–7):

A the house that he built (that is, Solomon's palace)

B food of his table

C seating of his servants
C' standing of his attendants and attire

B' cupbearers

A' ascent to the house of Yahweh

=== Verse 10 ===
And she gave the king an hundred and twenty talents of gold, and of spices very great store, and precious stones: there came no more such abundance of spices as these which the queen of Sheba gave to king Solomon.

- "120 talents": about 4 1/2 tons, or 4 metric tons. One talent was about 75 pounds or 34 kilograms.
- "Queen of Sheba" (from Hebrew: מַלְכַּת־ שְׁבָא, malkat-šəḇā; Koine Greek: βασίλισσα Σαβὰ in the Septuagint): deducted by most experts to be from an African kingdom centered around the ancient kingdoms of Nubia and Aksum, in present-day Ethiopia, which location name "Sheba" was quite well known in the classical world as Arabia Felix. Around the middle of the first millennium BCE, the Sabaeans were recorded to dwell in the Horn of Africa, the area that later became the realm of Aksum. In the New Testament Gospels, she was referred to as the "queen of the South" (Greek: βασίλισσα νότου, Latin: Regina austri), who "came from the uttermost parts of the earth", i.e. from the extremities of the then known world, to hear the wisdom of Solomon (Matthew 12:42; Luke 11:31).

== Solomon's wealth (10:14–29) ==
The description of Solomon's wisdom and wealth in this passage centers on the glory of his throne (verse 18), greater than any of the Gentiles (verse 20), sitting on the seventh level above six steps (verse 19), and thus depicting Solomon seated in a 'sabbatical' position The structure of these verses is:

A a great throne made of ivory ("tooth"), overlaid with pure gold ("refined")

B six ascending steps to the throne

C the top was round at the back

D armrests on either side of

E the place of "resting" (שֶׁבֶת, shebeth, meaning "seat', "dwelling", "place")

D' a pair of lions, each on the side of the armrests

C' twelve lions standing.

B' on the six steps, one at either end of each step

A' nothing like that had ever been made for any kingdom.

Everything around Solomon was literally layered in gold, such that silver 'was not considered as anything in the days of Solomon' (verse 21), against the warning in Deuteronomy 17:17 about not hoarding too much silver and gold. Solomon also profited from being an 'agent for the export of arms from Egypt to Syria and Asia Minor' (cf. Deuteronomy 17:16).

== See also ==
- 666
- Algum
- Arabia
- Hiram
- Hittites
- Israel
- Jerusalem
- Lebanon
- Ophir
- Shekel
- Solomon's Temple
- Tarshish
- The Embarkation of the Queen of Sheba
- Throne of Solomon
- Related Bible parts: Deuteronomy 17, 2 Samuel 8, 1 Kings 5, 1 Kings 6, 1 Kings 7, 1 Kings 9, 2 Chronicles 1, 2 Chronicles 9

== Sources ==
- Collins, John J. (2014). "Chapter 14: 1 Kings 12 – 2 Kings 25". Introduction to the Hebrew Scriptures. Fortress Press. pp. 277–296. ISBN 978-1451469233.
- Coogan, Michael David (2007). Coogan, Michael David; Brettler, Marc Zvi; Newsom, Carol Ann; Perkins, Pheme (eds.). The New Oxford Annotated Bible with the Apocryphal/Deuterocanonical Books: New Revised Standard Version, Issue 48 (Augmented 3rd ed.). Oxford University Press. ISBN 978-0195288810.
- Dietrich, Walter (2007). "13. 1 and 2 Kings". In Barton, John; Muddiman, John (eds.). The Oxford Bible Commentary (first (paperback) ed.). Oxford University Press. pp. 232–266. ISBN 978-0199277186.
- Halley, Henry H. (1965). Halley's Bible Handbook: an abbreviated Bible commentary (24th (revised) ed.). Zondervan Publishing House. ISBN 0-310-25720-4.
- Hayes, Christine (2015). Introduction to the Bible. Yale University Press. ISBN 978-0300188271.
- Leithart, Peter J. (2006). 1 & 2 Kings. Brazos Theological Commentary on the Bible. Brazos Press. ISBN 978-1587431258.
- McKane, William (1993). "Kings, Book of". In Metzger, Bruce M; Coogan, Michael D (eds.). The Oxford Companion to the Bible. Oxford University Press. pp. 409–413. ISBN 978-0195046458.
- Metzger, Bruce M; Coogan, Michael D, eds. (1993). The Oxford Companion to the Bible. Oxford University Press. ISBN 978-0195046458.
- Würthwein, Ernst (1995). The Text of the Old Testament. Translated by Rhodes, Erroll F. Grand Rapids, MI: Wm. B. Eerdmans. ISBN 0-8028-0788-7.
