= 1 Chronicles 17 =

First Book of Chronicles, chapter 17

- ← chapter 16 chapter 18 →
- The complete Hebrew text of the Books of Chronicles (1 and 2 Chronicles) in the Leningrad Codex (1008 CE).
- Book: Books of Chronicles
- Category: Ketuvim
- Christian Bible part: Old Testament
- Order in the Christian part: 13

1 Chronicles 17 is the seventeenth chapter of the Books of Chronicles in the Hebrew Bible or the First Book of Chronicles in the Old Testament of the Christian Bible. The book is compiled from older sources by an unknown person or group, designated by modern scholars as "the Chronicler", and had the final shape established in late fifth or fourth century BCE. This chapter contains God's covenant with David through the prophet Nathan and David's response in the form of thanksgiving prayer. The whole chapter belongs to the section focusing on the kingship of David (1 Chronicles 9:35 to 29:30).

== Text ==
This chapter was originally written in the Hebrew language. It is divided into 27 verses.

=== Textual witnesses ===
Some early manuscripts containing the text of this chapter in Hebrew are of the Masoretic Text tradition, which includes the Aleppo Codex (10th century), and Codex Leningradensis (1008).

There is also a translation into Koine Greek known as the Septuagint, made in the last few centuries BCE. Extant ancient manuscripts of the Septuagint version include Codex Vaticanus (B; $\mathfrak{G}$^{B}; 4th century), Codex Sinaiticus (S; BHK: $\mathfrak{G}$^{S}; 4th century), Codex Alexandrinus (A; $\mathfrak{G}$^{A}; 5th century) and Codex Marchalianus (Q; $\mathfrak{G}$^{Q}; 6th century).

=== Old Testament references ===
- 1 Chronicles 17:1–15: 2 Samuel 7:1–17.
- 1 Chronicles 17:16–27:2 Samuel 7:18–29.

== God’s covenant with David (17:1–15) ==
This section closely follows 2 Samuel 7:1–16 with minor redaction to suit the context. Nathan's personal opinion (verse 2) was corrected by God in the subsequent prophecy, without mentioning David's lack of suitability for building the temple (explained later in 1 Chronicles 22:7–10).

=== Verse 1 ===
Now when David lived in his house, David said to Nathan the prophet, “Behold, I dwell in a house of cedar, but the ark of the covenant of the LORD is under a tent."

- "Under a tent": literally "under tent curtains" (cf. Exodus 26:1–2,7; Numbers 4:21–28).

The statement "and the Lord had given him rest from all his enemies around him" in 2 Samuel 7:1 is not copied by the Chronicler, because David's wars have yet to be described (1 Chronicles 18–20).

=== Verse 14 ===
"And I will establish him in My house and in My kingdom forever; and his throne shall be established forever."

- "In My kingdom forever": The kingship of God is manifested through David's kingdom and his heirs (1 Chronicles 28:5; 29:11; 2 Chronicles 13:8; cf. 2 Samuel 7:16).

Here the Chronicler portrays 'the seed after David', arising from his sons, as the Messiah, whom the prophets announced as the "Son of David", a divergence from 2 Samuel 7:14-16, so it omits "If he commit iniquity, I will chasten him with the rod of men" (2 Samuel 7:14), because the chastisement would be important for the direct sons of David and the kings of Judah, but not for the Messiah, from whom God will never withdraw His grace.

== David’s Prayer of Thanksgiving (17:16–27) ==
This passage contains David's prayer as a reply to the promise given by God through Nathan. Apart from a slight change in the name used for God, the section closely follows 2 Samuel 7:17–29.

== See also ==
- Ark of the Covenant
- Jerusalem
- Solomon
- Tabernacle
- Related Bible parts: Exodus 26, Numbers 4, 1 Kings 4, 1 Chronicles 22, 2 Chronicles 1

== Sources ==
- Ackroyd, Peter R (1993). "Chronicles, Books of". In Metzger, Bruce M; Coogan, Michael D (eds.). The Oxford Companion to the Bible. Oxford University Press. pp. 113–116. ISBN 978-0195046458.
- Bennett, William (2018). The Expositor's Bible: The Books of Chronicles. Litres. ISBN 978-5040825196.
- Coogan, Michael David (2007). Coogan, Michael David; Brettler, Marc Zvi; Newsom, Carol Ann; Perkins, Pheme (eds.). The New Oxford Annotated Bible with the Apocryphal/Deuterocanonical Books: New Revised Standard Version, Issue 48 (Augmented 3rd ed.). Oxford University Press. ISBN 9780195288810.
- Endres, John C. (2012). First and Second Chronicles. Liturgical Press. ISBN 9780814628447.
- Gilbert, Henry L (1897). "The Forms of the Names in 1 Chronicles 1-7 Compared with Those in Parallel Passages of the Old Testament". The American Journal of Semitic Languages and Literatures. 13 (4). Liturgical Press: 279–298. doi:10.1086/369250. JSTOR 527992.
- Hill, Andrew E. (2003). First and Second Chronicles. Zondervan. ISBN 9780310206101.
- Mabie, Frederick (2017). "I. The Chronicler's Genealogical Survey of All Israel". In Longman III, Tremper; Garland, David E (eds.). 1 and 2 Chronicles. The Expositor's Bible Commentary. Zondervan. pp. 267–308. ISBN 978-0310531814.
- Mathys, H. P. (2007). "14. 1 and 2 Chronicles". In Barton, John; Muddiman, John (eds.). The Oxford Bible Commentary (first (paperback) ed.). Oxford University Press. pp. 267–308. ISBN 978-0199277186.
- Tuell, Steven S. (2012). First and Second Chronicles. Westminster John Knox Press. ISBN 978-0664238650.
- Würthwein, Ernst (1995). The Text of the Old Testament. Translated by Rhodes, Erroll F. Grand Rapids, MI: William B. Eerdmans. ISBN 0-8028-0788-7.
