= Genesis 28 =

Genesis 28 may refer to:

- The Jewish parashah Toledot covering verses 1 to 9 of this chapter in the Book of Genesis, or
- The parashah Vayetze, covering verses 10 to 22 of the same chapter
- Jacob's dream of a ladder leading to heaven, recounted in verses 10-19 of the same chapter
