= 1 Chronicles 23 =

First Book of Chronicles, chapter 23

- ← chapter 22 chapter 24 →
- The complete Hebrew text of the Books of Chronicles (1 and 2 Chronicles) in the Leningrad Codex (1008 CE).
- Book: Books of Chronicles
- Category: Ketuvim
- Christian Bible part: Old Testament
- Order in the Christian part: 13

1 Chronicles 23 is the twenty-third chapter of the Books of Chronicles in the Hebrew Bible or the First Book of Chronicles in the Old Testament of the Christian Bible. The book is compiled from older sources by an unknown person or group, designated by modern scholars as "the Chronicler", and had the final shape established in late fifth or fourth century BCE. This chapter records the divisions and duties of the Levites. The whole chapter belongs to the section focusing on the kingship of David (1 Chronicles 9:35 to 29:30), which from chapter 22 to the end does not have parallel in 2 Samuel.

== Text ==
This chapter was originally written in the Hebrew language. It is divided into 32 verses.

=== Textual witnesses ===
Some early manuscripts containing the text of this chapter in Hebrew are of the Masoretic Text tradition, which includes the Aleppo Codex (10th century), and Codex Leningradensis (1008).

Extant manuscripts of a Koine Greek translation known as the Septuagint, made in the last few centuries BCE, include Codex Vaticanus (B; $\mathfrak{G}$^{B}; 4th century), Codex Alexandrinus (A; $\mathfrak{G}$^{A}; 5th century) and Codex Marchalianus (Q; $\mathfrak{G}$^{Q}; 6th century). (Note: The extant Codex Sinaiticus only contains 1 Chronicles 9:27–19:17.)

== David organizes the Levites (23:1–24) ==
This section details David's preparation for his succession as he reached a venerable stage of life, and his priority was to instruct the leaders of Israel, the priests and the Levites, who would help Solomon reigning and building the temple. The census of the Levites (verses 3–5) does not contradict 1 Chronicles 21:6, because it is not a general population census but concerns the division of duties only ascribed to this particular tribe. The Levites are not primarily recorded according to their family trees here, but significantly to their functions: officers and judges, gatekeepers, musicians. They are to be listed further in 1 Chronicles 23–26.

=== Verse 1 ===
So when David was old and full of days, he made Solomon his son king over Israel.

- "Full of days": like Abraham (Genesis 25:8), Isaac (Genesis 35:29) and Job (42:17).

=== Verse 2 ===
And he gathered together all the princes of Israel, with the priests and the Levites.

David prepared well for his death and the reign of his successor, Solomon, by convening his officials to achieve a smooth transition (without mentioning the events recorded in 2 Samuel 15–1 Kings 2. The verse parallels 1 Chronicles 28:1 for the latter as a 'resumptive repetition'. although there are apparent differences (cf. 1 Chronicles 13:5 and 15:3 show that repetitions does not always need be 'resumptive'.

=== Verse 3 ===
Now the Levites were numbered from the age of thirty years and above; and the number of individual males was thirty-eight thousand.

The minimum age of Levites for holding office varies, perhaps according to the number of people available for the duties: 30 years old and above in Numbers 4:3, 23, 30, as here; 25 in Numbers 8:24; 20 in Ezra 3:8;1 Chronicles 23:24–27; 2 Chronicles 31:17.

=== Verse 6 ===
And David divided them into courses among the sons of Levi, namely, Gershon, Kohath, and Merari.

The 'tripartite segmentation' of the Levites is similar to that in Exodus 6:16–19; Numbers 3:17–39; 1 Chronicles 6:1, 16–47. The families of these three Levite clans are listed in verses 7–24, resulting 24 courses (Japhet (1993: 43): Gershon 10, Kohath 9, Merari 5) or 22 (Rudolph (1955: 155): Gershon 9, Kohath 9, Merari 4). Each course or division was to perform duties in rotation until a round was completed and a new round was started.

== Duties of the Levites (23:25–32) ==
This section covers the duties of the Levites, partly repeating those mentioned in 1 Chronicles 9. The peace granted by YHWH to his people forced changes to be made in the job descriptions (verses 25–26, 28–32) in contrast to Deuteronomy 12:8–12 or 1 Chronicles 22:9.

== See also ==
- High Priests of Israel
- House of David
- Jerusalem
- Solomon's Temple
- Related Bible parts: Exodus 6, Deuteronomy 12, Numbers 3, Numbers 4, Numbers 8, 1 Chronicles 6, Ezra 3

== Sources ==
- Ackroyd, Peter R (1993). "Chronicles, Books of". In Metzger, Bruce M; Coogan, Michael D (eds.). The Oxford Companion to the Bible. Oxford University Press. pp. 113–116. ISBN 978-0195046458.
- Bennett, William (2018). The Expositor's Bible: The Books of Chronicles. Litres. ISBN 978-5040825196.
- Coogan, Michael David (2007). Coogan, Michael David; Brettler, Marc Zvi; Newsom, Carol Ann; Perkins, Pheme (eds.). The New Oxford Annotated Bible with the Apocryphal/Deuterocanonical Books: New Revised Standard Version, Issue 48 (Augmented 3rd ed.). Oxford University Press. ISBN 9780195288810.
- Endres, John C. (2012). First and Second Chronicles. Liturgical Press. ISBN 9780814628447.
- Hill, Andrew E. (2003). First and Second Chronicles. Zondervan. ISBN 9780310206101.
- Mabie, Frederick (2017). "I. The Chronicler's Genealogical Survey of All Israel". In Longman III, Tremper; Garland, David E (eds.). 1 and 2 Chronicles. The Expositor's Bible Commentary. Zondervan. pp. 267–308. ISBN 978-0310531814.
- Mathys, H. P. (2007). "14. 1 and 2 Chronicles". In Barton, John; Muddiman, John (eds.). The Oxford Bible Commentary (first (paperback) ed.). Oxford University Press. pp. 267–308. ISBN 978-0199277186.
- Tuell, Steven S. (2012). First and Second Chronicles. Westminster John Knox Press. ISBN 978-0664238650.
- Würthwein, Ernst (1995). The Text of the Old Testament. Translated by Rhodes, Erroll F. Grand Rapids, MI: William B. Eerdmans. ISBN 0-8028-0788-7.
