= 1 Chronicles 22 =

First Book of Chronicles, chapter 22

- ← chapter 21 chapter 23 →
- The complete Hebrew text of the Books of Chronicles (1 and 2 Chronicles) in the Leningrad Codex (1008 CE).
- Book: Books of Chronicles
- Category: Ketuvim
- Christian Bible part: Old Testament
- Order in the Christian part: 13

1 Chronicles 22 is the twenty-two chapter of the Books of Chronicles in the Hebrew Bible or the First Book of Chronicles in the Old Testament of the Christian Bible. The book is compiled from older sources by an unknown person or group, designated by modern scholars as "the Chronicler", and had the final shape established in late fifth or fourth century BCE. This chapter records David's preparation to build the temple, consisting of three parts: (1) David's (own) preparations for the temple's construction (verses 2–5); (2) David's speech to Solomon (verses 6–16); (3) David's speech to Israel's rulers (verses 17–19). The whole chapter belongs to the section focusing on the kingship of David (1 Chronicles 9:35 to 29:30), which from this chapter to the end does not have parallel in 2 Samuel.

== Text ==
This chapter was originally written in the Hebrew language. It is divided into 19 verses.

=== Textual witnesses ===
Some early manuscripts containing the text of this chapter in Hebrew are of the Masoretic Text tradition, which includes the Aleppo Codex (10th century), and Codex Leningradensis (1008).

Extant manuscripts of a Koine Greek translation known as the Septuagint, made in the last few centuries BCE, include Codex Vaticanus (B; $\mathfrak{G}$^{B}; 4th century), Codex Alexandrinus (A; $\mathfrak{G}$^{A}; 5th century) and Codex Marchalianus (Q; $\mathfrak{G}$^{Q}; 6th century). (Note: The extant Codex Sinaiticus only contains 1 Chronicles 9:27–19:17.)

== Preparations for the temple (22:1–5) ==
This section records the material and spiritual preparations for the construction of the temple which David wish to be famous and glorified throughout all the lands (verse 5), because the quality of the palace-temple complex projects the power of a nation, its god, and its king to other nations, gods, vassals, or foreign emissaries. The Chronicler is very particular in providing explanation how the temple site was selected (verse 1 and 2 Chronicles 3:1).

=== Verse 1 ===
Then David said, This is the house of the LORD God, and this is the altar of the burnt offering for Israel.

The verse becomes the climax of the preceding and subsequent sections in that the future site of YHWH's temple (and place for sacrifices) is gloriously announced, regarded 'synonymous' with the desert tabernacle, the high place at Gibeon or 'all legitimate cultic sites and buildings that play an important part in Israel's history'. The selection of the site is very important for the Chronicler, as repeated in 2 Chronicles 3:1. The language is very similar to Genesis 28:17, pertaining to the construction of the holy site at Bethel.

=== Verse 4 ===
and cedar logs without number, for the Sidonians and the Tyrians brought much cedar wood to David.

- "Without number" or "in abundance" (KJV) is translated from Hebrew: לאין מספר lə-’ên, mis-pār, also meaning "beyond measure".
- "The Sidonians and Tyrians": were mentioned as those who brought cedar wood, a reminiscent of King Hiram I(1 Chronicles 14:1), in parallel with Ezra 3:7 that the Sidonians and Tyrians were also providing timber (cedar wood) for the second temple.

=== Verse 5 ===
And David said, Solomon my son is young and tender, and the house that is to be builded for the LORD must be exceeding magnifical, of fame and of glory throughout all countries: I will therefore now make preparation for it. So David prepared abundantly before his death.

- "Solomon": of David's numerous sons (1 Chronicles 3:1–4; 14:3–7) is one of the youngest (1 Samuel 20:31; 2 Samuel 13:21; 1 Kings 1:12, 17; 2:22).
- "Young and tender": Solomon was regarded by David in a similar manner to Solomon's own admission while in prayer at Gibeon (1 Kings 3:7), especially about Solomon's youth and inexperience, which is considered as a literary theme, not a pointer to his actual age, nor to his ability to rule the nation, but particularly to his capability in building the temple. Therefore, David took the responsibility to prepare the construction.

== Solomon anointed to build the temple (22:6–19) ==
The section contains two speeches by David, the first one to Solomon (verses 6–16) and the second to the leaders of Israel (verses 17–19). The speech to Solomon parallels David's final decrees in 1 Kings 2 and quotes the dynastic promise in 1 Chronicles 17 (cf. 2 Samuel 7), with the explanation why David was not permitted to build the temple (verse 8). Only David's call to 'abide by the law and act courageously' (1 Kings 2:2–3) is transmitted here. The relationship between David and Solomon in the Chronicles resembles that of Moses and Joshua. The encouragement given by David to Solomon for the forthcoming work, forecasting success if he faithfully follows God and confirms God's presence (verses 11–13) resembles the message in Joshua 1 regarding Joshua's succession to Moses (also using the terms 'the LORD be with you' and 'success').

=== Verse 8 ===
but the word of the Lord came to me, saying, ‘You have shed much blood and have made great wars; you shall not build a house for My name, because you have shed much blood on the earth in My sight.

Nathan's prophecy in 2 Samuel 7 and 1 Chronicles 17 does not provide the explanation why David was not allowed to build the temple. In 1 Kings 5:3 Solomon stated that David was impeded from carrying out his plan, because of his long warfare with the surrounding nations. In the Chronicles, the statement is transformed to a greater principle, that is, because David as a warrior had shed much blood, he was forbidden to build the temple. The reason is simply to exclude the blemish of bloodshed from the temple's construction.

=== Verse 9 ===
Behold, a son shall be born to you who shall be a man of rest. I will give him rest from all his surrounding enemies. For his name shall be Solomon, and I will give peace and quiet to Israel in his days.

Using wordplay, "Solomon" (Hebrew: שְׁלֹמֹה֙, shə-lō-mōh, meaning: "peaceful") was to be given "peace" (שָׁל֥וֹם, shā-lōm), and, as a "man of rest" (איש מנוחה, ’îsh mə-nū-chāh), was to be given "rest" (נוּחַ, nuach), so he could build the temple. This was to fulfill the precondition in Deuteronomy 12 that the sacrificial services could take place when Israel had "rest" from its enemies.

== See also ==
- David's Mighty Warriors
- House of David
- Jerusalem
- Solomon's Temple
- Related Bible parts: Deuteronomy 22, Joshua 1, 2 Samuel 7, 1 Kings 5, 1 Chronicles 17

== Sources ==
- Ackroyd, Peter R (1993). "Chronicles, Books of". In Metzger, Bruce M; Coogan, Michael D (eds.). The Oxford Companion to the Bible. Oxford University Press. pp. 113–116. ISBN 978-0195046458.
- Bennett, William (2018). The Expositor's Bible: The Books of Chronicles. Litres. ISBN 978-5040825196.
- Coogan, Michael David (2007). Coogan, Michael David; Brettler, Marc Zvi; Newsom, Carol Ann; Perkins, Pheme (eds.). The New Oxford Annotated Bible with the Apocryphal/Deuterocanonical Books: New Revised Standard Version, Issue 48 (Augmented 3rd ed.). Oxford University Press. ISBN 9780195288810.
- Endres, John C. (2012). First and Second Chronicles. Liturgical Press. ISBN 9780814628447.
- Hill, Andrew E. (2003). First and Second Chronicles. Zondervan. ISBN 9780310206101.
- Mabie, Frederick (2017). "I. The Chronicler's Genealogical Survey of All Israel". In Longman III, Tremper; Garland, David E (eds.). 1 and 2 Chronicles. The Expositor's Bible Commentary. Zondervan. pp. 267–308. ISBN 978-0310531814.
- Mathys, H. P. (2007). "14. 1 and 2 Chronicles". In Barton, John; Muddiman, John (eds.). The Oxford Bible Commentary (first (paperback) ed.). Oxford University Press. pp. 267–308. ISBN 978-0199277186.
- Tuell, Steven S. (2012). First and Second Chronicles. Westminster John Knox Press. ISBN 978-0664238650.
- Würthwein, Ernst (1995). The Text of the Old Testament. Translated by Rhodes, Erroll F. Grand Rapids, MI: William B. Eerdmans. ISBN 0-8028-0788-7.
