= 2 Samuel 6 =

Second Book of Samuel chapter

- ← chapter 5 chapter 7 →
- The pages containing the Books of Samuel (1 & 2 Samuel) Leningrad Codex (1008 CE).
- Book: First book of Samuel
- Hebrew Bible part: Nevi'im
- Order in the Hebrew part: 3
- Category: Former Prophets
- Christian Bible part: Old Testament
- Order in the Christian part: 10

2 Samuel 6 is the sixth chapter of the Second Book of Samuel in the Old Testament of the Christian Bible or the second part of Books of Samuel in the Hebrew Bible. Jewish tradition attributes the book to the prophet Samuel, with later additions by the prophets Gad and Nathan; modern scholarship, however, regards it as a compilation of independent texts dated to c. 630–540 BCE. This chapter contains the account of David's reign in Jerusalem. This is within a section comprising 2 Samuel 2–8 that deals with the period when David set up his kingdom.

== Text ==
This chapter was originally written in Biblical Hebrew. It is divided into 23 verses.

=== Textual witnesses ===
Some early manuscripts containing the text of this chapter in Biblical Hebrew are of the Masoretic Textual tradition, which includes the Codex Cairensis (895), Aleppo Codex (10th century), and Codex Leningradensis (1008). Fragments containing parts of this chapter in Hebrew were found among the Dead Sea Scrolls including 4Q51 (4QSam^{a}; 100–50 BCE) with extant verses 2–18.

Extant ancient manuscripts of a translation into Koine Greek known as the Septuagint (compiled in the last few centuries BCE) include Codex Vaticanus (B; $\mathfrak{G}$^{B}; 4th century) and Codex Alexandrinus (A; $\mathfrak{G}$^{A}; 5th century). (Note: The whole book of 2 Samuel is missing from the extant Codex Sinaiticus.)

== Places ==
Places mentioned in this chapter
- Baale of Judah
- City of David
- Gibeah
- Jerusalem
- Perez-uzzah

== Analysis ==
The chapter has the following structure:

1. David gathers the people to bring up the Ark of the Covenant: Celebrations commence (6:1–5).
2. Interruption: Uzzah's death halts the festivities (6:6–11).
3. The Ark enters the City of David: Joy and offerings (6:12–15).
4. Interruption: Michal despises David (6:16).
5. The reception of the Ark: David blesses the people, and they go home (6:17–19).
6. Epilogue: Michal confronts David (6:20–23).

The narrative centers on the Ark of the Covenant entering the City of David with proper religious reverence. The ending occurs when David blesses the people, invoking "the name of the LORD of hosts" (verse 18), which was introduced at the start of the celebrations (verse 2). The structure of the story is filled with festive language, unlike the interruptions or the epilogue.

== Taking the Ark to Jerusalem (6:1–11) ==
Verses 1–19 of this chapter are a continuation of the Ark of the Covenant narrative in 1 Samuel 4:1–1 Samuel 7:1. Nevertheless, it may not have originated as a continuous narrative, as evidenced by notable discrepancies in the names of locations and individuals, as well as variations in the characteristics of the narratives. Chronologically, David could be in a position to bring the Ark to Jerusalem only after a decisive victory over the Philistines (such as the one recorded in 1 Samuel 5:17–25). Since its return from the Philistines (1 Samuel 7:1), the Ark of the Covenant had presumably remained in Kirjath-Jearim (Biblical Hebrew: קִרְיַת־יְעָרִים, romanized: qiryat-yeʿārîm, lit. 'town of forests'), known in this passage as "Baalei Yehudah" (בַּעֲלֵי־יְהוּדָה, baʿălê-yĕhûdāh, 'lords [of] Judah'). (Note: 4QSam^{a}, 1 Chronicles 13:8, and Joshua 15:9 have "Baalah".) Similarity to 1 Samuel 4:4 can be observed in referring the Ark as "the Ark of God" (i.e., YHWH), and YHWH as "enthroned on the cherubim" (כְּרוּבִים, kĕrûḇîm, 'cherubs'), whereas "new cart" echoes 1 Samuel 6:7. "The house of Abinadab" is also known from 1 Samuel 7:1, but Abinadab's sons, Uzzah and Ahio, appear here instead of Eleazar, son of Aaron, who was appointed to caring for the Ark in 1 Samuel 7. As recounted in Numbers 20:25–28, Eleazar had been ordained as High Priest of Israel (הַכֹּהֵן הַגָּדוֹל, ha-kōhēn ha-gādôl) as his father died.

The transport of the Ark was an occasion of joy and celebration: "David and all Israel danced before God with all their might—with songs, lyres, harps, hand-drums, cymbals, and trumpets," records 1 Chronicles 13:8. The festivity was interrupted by Uzzah's sudden death after he touched the Ark, which originated from the same power that brought plagues upon the Philistines in 1 Samuel 5:6–12 and devastation to the town of Beit Shemesh (בֵּית־שֶׁמֶשׁ, bêt-šemeš, 'house of the sun') in 1 Samuel 6:19. David was unwilling to take more risks, so the Ark was left for three months at the house of Obed-edom the Gittite, one of David's loyal servants since his time in Ziklag. Obed-edom might have been a non-Israelite—and possibly a worshiper of a different god—or a Levite, but he willingly housed the Ark; his status is debated.

=== Verse 2 ===
And David arose and went with all the people who were with him from Baale Judah to bring up from there the Ark of God, whose name is called by the Name, the LORD of Hosts, who dwells between the cherubim.

- "Baale Judah", also known as "Baalah" or "Kirjathbaal": A city of the tribe of Judah, and the same as Kiriath-Jearim. After the return from the Philistines, the Ark was transported from Beit Shemesh to this place and remained there for nearly fifty years.

=== Verse 3 ===
So they set the Ark of God on a new cart, and brought it out of the house of Abinadab, which was on the hill; and Uzzah and Ahio, the sons of Abinadab, drove the new cart.

- "A new cart": after these words, the Septuagint has an addition, "with the Ark". (Note: Note on 2 Samuel 6:3 in NKJV.) The use of "cart" might be intended as a sign of respect, as in 1 Samuel 6:7, but it went against the text of the Torah in Numbers 7:9, which states that the Levites must carry the Ark, although this might be considered impractical at the time due to the terrain's condition ("on the hill").
- "House of Abinadab": at this time, Abinadab himself may have been long dead. Therefore, Uzzah and Ahio could be either his sons—now advanced in years—or his grandsons.
- "On the hill": rendered in KJV and some other English Christian versions as "in Gibeah".

== The Ark of the Covenant entered Jerusalem (6:12–23) ==
Despite a bitter experience with the Ark, David was adamant about bringing it to Jerusalem, this time with a blessing (verse 12) and again with much celebration and sacrifice. As the Ark finally entered Jerusalem, the celebration reached its peak, with David, only wearing "a linen ephod" (אֵפוֹד, ʾēp̄ôḏ; a priestly garment covering the torso and loins), leading vigorous circular dances with the assembly of people accompanied by blasts on the trumpet, the shofar (שׁוֹפָר, šôp̄ār; a ram's horn) for this joyous event. The Ark was housed in a tent specifically made for it by David (verse 17)—not the same as the original wilderness "tabernacle" (מִשְׁכָּן, miškān, 'dwelling place')—but was probably constructed with some features that were later adopted when constructing Solomon’s Temple for the Ark. The whole festive ceremony was concluded with sacrifices, blessings, and gifts; it may well become an annually repeated celebration. Psalm 132 could be based on the story of the transfer of the Ark to Jerusalem in this chapter, as no references are found except in parallel chapters.

Michal, Saul's daughter and David's first wife, was not pleased with David dancing scantily clothed before his servants' maids among the people. (Her story appears in verse 16 and continues in verses 19–23.) She rebuked David with an irony that "the king honoring himself", but David vowed to make himself even "more contemptible than this" in showing his piety to YHWH. The statement in verse 23 of Michal's childlessness is significant in relation to David's relations with the house of Saul and with David's own descendants.

=== Verse 13 ===
And so it was, when those bearing the Ark of the LORD had gone six paces, that he sacrificed oxen and fatted sheep.

- "Had gone six paces" refers to "repeated sacrifice every six steps", not just one sacrifice after the first six steps.

== See also ==
- Cornet
- Cymbals
- Ephod
- Fir
- Flagon
- Harp
- Israelites
- Korban
- Nachon
- Philistines
- Psaltery
- Threshingfloor
- Timbrel
- Tribes of Israel
- United Monarchy of Israel
- Related Bible parts: 1 Samuel 4, 1 Samuel 5, 1 Samuel 6, 1 Samuel 7, 1 Chronicles 12, 1 Chronicles 13, 1 Chronicles 15, 1 Chronicles 16, Psalm 132

== Sources ==
=== Commentaries on Samuel ===
- Auld, Graeme (2003). "1 & 2 Samuel". In James D. G. Dunn and John William Rogerson (ed.). Eerdmans Commentary on the Bible. Eerdmans. ISBN 9780802837110.
- Bergen, David T. (1996). 1, 2 Samuel. B&H Publishing Group. ISBN 9780805401073.
- Chapman, Stephen B. (2016). 1 Samuel as Christian Scripture: A Theological Commentary. Wm. B. Eerdmans Publishing Company. ISBN 978-1467445160.
- Collins, John J. (2014). "Chapter 14: 1 Samuel 12 – 2 Samuel 25". Introduction to the Hebrew Scriptures. Fortress Press. pp. 277–296. ISBN 978-1451469233.
- Evans, Paul (2018). Longman, Tremper (ed.). 1-2 Samuel. The Story of God Bible Commentary. Zondervan Academic. ISBN 978-0310490944.
- Gordon, Robert (1986). I & II Samuel, A Commentary. Paternoster Press. ISBN 9780310230229.
- Hertzberg, Hans Wilhelm (1964). I & II Samuel, A Commentary (trans. from German 2nd edition 1960 ed.). Westminster John Knox Press. p. 19. ISBN 978-0664223182.
- Morrison, Craig E. (2013). Berit Olam: 2 Samuel. Liturgical Press. ISBN 978-0814682913.
- Steinmann, Andrew (2017). 2 Samuel. Concordia commentary: a theological exposition of sacred scripture. Concordia Publishing House. ISBN 9780758650061.

=== General ===
- Breytenbach, Andries (2000). "Who Is Behind The Samuel Narrative?". In Johannes Cornelis de Moor and H.F. Van Rooy (ed.). Past, Present, Future: the Deuteronomistic History and the Prophets. Brill. ISBN 9789004118713.
- Coogan, Michael David (2007). Coogan, Michael David; Brettler, Marc Zvi; Newsom, Carol Ann; Perkins, Pheme (eds.). The New Oxford Annotated Bible with the Apocryphal/Deuterocanonical Books: New Revised Standard Version, Issue 48 (Augmented 3rd ed.). Oxford University Press. ISBN 978-0195288810.
- Fitzmyer, Joseph A. (2008). A Guide to the Dead Sea Scrolls and Related Literature. Grand Rapids, MI: William B. Eerdmans Publishing Company. ISBN 9780802862419.
- Halley, Henry H. (1965). Halley's Bible Handbook: an abbreviated Bible commentary (24th (revised) ed.). Zondervan Publishing House. ISBN 0-310-25720-4.
- Hayes, Christine (2015). Introduction to the Bible. Yale University Press. ISBN 978-0300188271.
- Jones, Gwilym H. (2007). "12. 1 and 2 Samuel". In Barton, John; Muddiman, John (eds.). The Oxford Bible Commentary (first (paperback) ed.). Oxford University Press. pp. 196–232. ISBN 978-0199277186.
- Klein, R.W. (2003). "Samuel, books of". In Bromiley, Geoffrey W (ed.). The International Standard Bible Encyclopedia. Eerdmans. ISBN 9780802837844.
- Knight, Douglas A (1995). "Chapter 4 Deuteronomy and the Deuteronomists". In James Luther Mays, David L. Petersen and Kent Harold Richards (ed.). Old Testament Interpretation. T&T Clark. ISBN 9780567292896.
- McKane, William (1993). "Samuel, Book of". In Metzger, Bruce M; Coogan, Michael D (eds.). The Oxford Companion to the Bible. Oxford University Press. pp. 409–413. ISBN 978-0195046458.
- Ulrich, Eugene, ed. (2010). The Biblical Qumran Scrolls: Transcriptions and Textual Variants. Brill.
- Würthwein, Ernst (1995). The Text of the Old Testament. Translated by Rhodes, Erroll F. Grand Rapids, MI: Wm. B. Eerdmans. ISBN 0-8028-0788-7.
