= Theophory in the Bible =

Theophory is the practice of embedding the name of a god or a deity in, usually, a proper name. (Note: From the Greek θεοφορία from θεοφόρος from Θεός "God" and φόρος "bearer" from φέρειν "to bear"; confer Φωσφόρος.) Much Hebrew theophory occurs in the Bible, particularly in the Old Testament (Hebrew Bible). The most prominent theophory involves names referring to:

- El, a word meaning might, power and (a) god in general, and hence in Judaism, God and among the Canaanites the name of the god who was the father of Baal.
- Yah/Jah, a shortened form of Yahweh/Jahweh, the pronunciation of the Tetragrammaton YHWH (יהוה).
  - They are also known as Yahveh/Jahveh and Yehovah/Jehovah.
- Levantine deities (especially the storm god, Hadad) by the epithet baal, meaning lord. In later times, as the conflict between Yahwism and the more popular pagan practices became increasingly intense, these names were censored and baal was replaced with bosheth, meaning "shame".

== El theophory ==
The following is an alphabetical list of names referring to El (אל) and their meanings in Hebrew:

Abdiel – Servant of God
Abiel – God my Father
Abimael – A Father sent from God
Adbeel – Disciplined of God
Adiel – Witness of God
Adriel – Flock of God
Ammiel – People of God
Ariel, Auriel – Lion of God
Azael – Whom God Strengthens
Azazel – God Strengthens or Arrogant to God
Azrael – Help of God
Barachel – Blessed of God
Bethel – House of God
Betzalel – Shadow/Path of God
Daniel – Judged by God or Judgement of God
Elead – God Forever
Eliana – My God Answers
Elijah – My God is Jah
Elisha – Salvation of God
Elishama – My God Hears
Elishua – God is my salvation
Eliezer – My God Helps
Elimelech – My God is King
Elizabeth – My God is Oath
Elkanah – God has Possessed, or God has Created
Emmanuel – God is with us
Ezekiel – God will Strengthen
Gabriel – Man of God, God has shown Himself Mighty, Hero of God or Strong one of God
Gamaliel – Reward of God
Hanniel – Glory of God
Immanuel – God with us
Ishmael – Heard by God, Named by God, or God Hearkens
Israel, Yisrael – Struggles with God or Prince of God
Jekuthiel – God will support
Jerahmeel – God's exaltation
Jezreel – God will sow
Joel – Jah is God
Lemuel – Dedicated to God
Mahalalel – The blessed God, The shining light of God, or The glory of God
Michael – Who is like God? a question
Mishael – Who is what God is? a question
Nathanael, Nathaniel – Given by God or God has Given or "Gift of God"
Nemuel – Day of God
Nuriel – Fire of God or Light of God
Othniel – Hour of God
Peniel, Penuel, Phanuel – Face of God
Raphael – God is Healing or Healing one of God
Reuel – Friend of God
Samuel – Name/Heard of God
Shealtiel – I asked God [for this child]
Uriel – Sun of God, Light of God or Fire of God
Uzziel – Power from God

=== Incorrect El theophory ===
- The name Abel (Hebrew: הֶבֶל, romanized: Hébel), which appears to refer to El, in fact is not an instance of theophory. Abel can be translated as "breath", "temporary" or "meaninglessness" and is the word translated as "vanity" in Ecclesiastes 1:2 in the King James Version.
- The name Jael/Yael (Hebrew: יָעֵל, romanized: Yāʿēl; pronounced /ˈdʒeɪəl/ or /ˈjeɪəl/) also appears to refer to El in English, but contains ayin rather than the aleph of El.
- The name Eli (Hebrew: עֵלִי, Modern: ʿElī, Tiberian: ʿĒlī) also appears to refer to El in English, but contains ayin rather than aleph.
- The name Rachel (Hebrew: רָחֵל, romanized: Rāḥēl, lit. 'ewe') also appears to refer to El in English, but contains chet.

== Yahweh theophory ==
The following is an alphabetical list of names referring to Yah/Jah (יה) and their meanings in Hebrew:

Prefix theophors

Jehoiachin – Yahweh is firmly established
Jehoiada – Yahweh knows
Jehoshaphat – Yahweh is judge
Jehosheba – Yahweh is my oath
Jehozadak – Righteous is Yahweh
Joab – Yahweh is father
John – Yahweh is gracious
Jonathan – gift of Yahweh
Jochebed – Yahweh is glory
Joel – Yahweh is El/God
Joshua – Yahweh saves/is (my) Saviour/Salvation or Yahweh is lordly (Niqqud dependent)

Suffix theophors

Abiah – Yahweh is my father
Abijah – Yahweh is my father (2 Chron. 13:3)
Adaiah – ornament of Yahweh
Adonijah – my lord is Yahweh
Ahaziah – vision of Yahweh
Ahiah – brother of Yahweh
Ahijah – brother of Yahweh
Amariah – Yahweh says; integrity of Yahweh
Amaziah – strength of Yahweh
Ananiah – Protected by Yah
Athaliah – Yahweh is exalted
Azariah – Yahweh has helped
Bathiah – Daughter of Yah
Bealiah – Yahweh is Lord
Dodavah(u) – Beloved of Yahweh
Elijah – My God is Yah
Hananiah – Yahweh is gracious
Gedaliah – Yahweh is great
Hezekiah – Yahweh has strengthened
Hodaviah/Hodiah – Give thanks to Yahweh, The splendour of Yahweh
Isaiah – Salvation of Yahweh
Isshiah – Yahweh exists
Jeconiah – Yahweh has firmly established
Jedaiah – Yah knows
Jedidiah – Beloved of Yah
Jehiah – Yahweh lives
Jekamiah – Yahweh raises
Jeremiah – Yah exalts
Jeshaiah – Salvation of Yahweh
Josiah – supported of Yahweh
Malchijah – Yahweh is king
Micaiah – Who is like Yahweh
Matityahu – Gift from Yah
Neariah – Servant of Yahweh
Nedabiah – Yahweh impels
Nehemiah – Yah comforts
Nethaniah – gift of Yahweh
Obadiah – Yahweh's servant or worshiper
Pedaiah – Redemption of Yahweh
Pelatiah – Yah has delivered
Pelaiah – Yah has distinguished
Pelaliah – Yah has judged
Pekahiah – Yah has observed
Reaiah – Yahweh has seen
Rephaiah – Yah has healed
Seraiah – Servant/prince of Yahweh
Shecaniah – One intimate with Yahweh
Shephatiah – Judged of Yahweh
Toviah – Good of Yahweh or Yahweh is Good
Uriah – My light is Yahweh
Uzziah – Yahweh is my strength
Zebadiah, Zabdi – Gift of Yahweh
Zechariah – Yah has remembered
Zedekiah – justice of or righteous is Yahweh
Zephaniah – Yahweh hides or protects

== Baal theophory ==
Ba'al is a generic term meaning master; it can also be translated "Lord". In the Bible, it is frequently a reference to Hadad, although it is sometimes used to refer to other specific deities, including Yahweh, and on other occasions is used to refer to an arbitrary lord of this area.

The following is an alphabetical list of names referring Ba'al, and their meanings in Hebrew:

Baalah – her lord; she that is governed or subdued; a spouse
Baalath – a rejoicing; our proud lord
Baalath-Beer – subjected pit
Baal-berith – lord of the covenant
Baale – same as Baalath
Baal-gad – lord Gad, or lord of Gad, or lord of fortune/felicity
Baal-hamon – he who rules a crowd
Baal-hanan – Ba'al is gracious
Baal-hermon – lord of destruction / of a cursed-thing
Baali – my lord; lord over me
Baalim – lords; masters; (later Jewish use: false gods)
Baalis – a rejoicing/proud lord
Baal-meon – lord/master of the house
Baal-Peor – master of Peor; master of the opening
Baal-perazim – lord of divisions
Baal-shalisha – the lord that presides over three; the third idol
Baal-tamar – master of the palm-tree
Baal-zebub – lord of the fly (satirical corruption of Ba'al-zebul - lord of princes)
Baal-zephon – the lord/possession of the north/hidden/secret
Jerub-baal – the lord contends
Eth-baal – with Baal

=== Bosheth ===
In later biblical and Jewish writing, some of the theophories in Ba'al were bowdlerised, with ba'al replaced by bosheth ((the) shameful (thing)):

Ish-bosheth, from Ishba'al, man of ba'al.
Josheb-basshebeth, seemingly a corruption of the preceding form
Jerubbeshet, from Jerubbaal "Ba'al contends"
Mephibosheth, from Mephibaal "from the mouth of Ba'al"

== Shaddai theophory ==
The following is an alphabetical list of names referring to Shaddai and their meanings in Hebrew:

Zurishaddai – Shaddai is my rock

== Yam theophory ==
Yam is the Canaanite god of the Sea.

Abijam – My father is Yam (1 Kgs. 14:31)

== Zedek theophory ==
Zedek (or Sydyk or Sedek) was the name of a Phoenician deity worshiped in Canaan. In Hebrew, "tzedek" (from the root tz-d-k) means "righteous", but Tzedek as a proper noun is the name of the planet Jupiter.

The following is an alphabetical list of names referring Zedek, and their meanings in Hebrew:

Melchi-zedek – My king is Zedek
Adoni-zedek – My lord is Zedek

== Hadad theophory ==
Apart from oblique references to Hadad by means of the word ba'al, some theophory references him directly:

Hadadezer – Hadad is my help
Ben-hadad – Son of Hadad

== Nabu theophory ==
Nabu, the Babylonian god of wisdom, is featured in several names within the Bible:

Nebosarsekim – Nabu, protect the prince
Nebuchadrezzar – Nabu, preserve the heir, mocked as Nebuchadnezzer – Nabu, preserve the donkey
Nebuzaradan – Nabu has given a seed

== Assur theophory ==
Assur, or Ashur, was the national god of the Assyrian people:

Asenappar – Assur is creator of an heir
Esar-Haddon – Assur has given me a brother
Osnappar – Assur is the creator of the heir

== Others ==
Barkos – Son of Qos
Belshazzar – Bel, protect the king
Chedorlaomer – Servant of Lagamar
Sennacherib – Sin has replaced brothers
Shalmaneser – Shulmanu is the best

== See also ==
- List of Biblical names
