= Jedidah =

In the Hebrew Bible, the mother of King Josiah of Judah

In the Hebrew Bible, in the Book of 2 Kings 22:1, Jedidah was the mother of Josiah (the King of Judah). She was the wife of king Amon of Judah, and the daughter of Adaiah, from Boscath (a town in the Kingdom of Judah).

Alternate spellings for this Bible character are "Jedida" or "Jeddida".
