= Iury Capuriche =

Brazilian footballer

Personal information
- Full name: Iury Rafael Capuriche
- Date of birth: 20 March 2003 (age 23)
- Place of birth: Rio Claro, Brazil
- Height: 1.75 m (5 ft 9 in)
- Position: Left-back

Youth career
- 2018: Rio Claro
- 2019: Jabaquara
- 2021–2023: Inter de Limeira
- 2023–2024: Portuguesa Santista

Senior career*
Years	Team	Apps	(Gls)
2024	Portuguesa Santista	0	(0)
2024	→ Colorado Caieiras (loan)	19	(2)
2025	Operário-MS	9	(0)
2025	Paulista	0	(0)
2026	Barretos	16	(0)
2026	São José-SP	0	(0)
- * Club domestic league appearances and goals as of 19:38, 21 June 2026 (UTC)

Iury Rafael Capuriche (born 20 March 2003), known as Iury Capuriche or just Iury, is a Brazilian footballer who plays as a left-back.

== Career ==
Born in Rio Claro, São Paulo, Iury began his career with hometown side Rio Claro, and later represented Jabaquara, Inter de Limeira and Portuguesa Santista as a youth. In 2024, he was loaned to Campeonato Paulista Segunda Divisão side Colorado Caieiras, being a regular starter as the club reached the finals of the tournament.

On 28 December 2024, Iury moved to Operário-MS, but returned to his native state with Paulista the following 18 August. After appearing in just one match, he signed for Barretos on 15 January 2026.

After impressing with BEC in the Campeonato Paulista Série A4, Iury was announced at São José-SP on 19 June 2026.

== Career statistics ==
As of 17 November 2026

Club	Season	League			State League		Cup		Continental		Other		Total	
Club	Season	Division	Apps	Goals	Apps	Goals	Apps	Goals	Apps	Goals	Apps	Goals	Apps	Goals
Colorado Caieiras	2024	Paulista 2ª Divisão	—		19	2	—		—		—		19	2
Operário-MS	2025	Série D	—		9	0	—		—		1 (Note: Appearance(s) in Copa Verde)	0	10	0
Paulista	2025	Paulista A4	—		—		—		—		1 (Note: Appearance(s) in Copa Paulista)	0	1	0
Barretos	2026	Paulista A4	—		16	0	—		—		—		16	0
São José-SP	2026	Paulista A2	—		—		—		—		5	0	5	0
Career total			0	0	44	2	0	0	0	0	7	0	51	2

== Honours ==
Operário-MS

- Campeonato Sul-Mato-Grossense: 2025

São José-SP

- Copa Paulista: 2026
