= Fábio Azevedo =

Brazilian footballer (born 1999)

Personal information
- Full name: Fábio Vitor Antonio Azevedo Pires
- Date of birth: 4 January 1999 (age 27)
- Place of birth: Votorantim, Brazil
- Height: 1.82 m (6 ft 0 in)
- Position: Forward

Team information
- Current team: Gifu

Youth career
- 2011–2013: São Paulo
- 2013–2014: Portuguesa
- 2015–2019: Audax-SP
- 2019: → Grêmio (loan)

Senior career*
| Years | Team | Apps | (Gls) |
| 2016–2020 | Audax-SP | 23 | (1) |
| 2016 | → Osasco (loan) | 2 | (0) |
| 2019 | → Grêmio (loan) | 0 | (0) |
| 2020 | Desportivo Brasil | 0 | (0) |
| 2021–2023 | Audax-SP | 12 | (1) |
| 2021 | → Audax-RJ (loan) | 1 | (0) |
| 2021 | → Colorado (loan) | 2 | (0) |
| 2022 | Independente-SP | 4 | (1) |
| 2022 | São Bento | 4 | (0) |
| 2023 | Audax-RJ | 1 | (0) |
| 2025 | São Caetano | 24 | (14) |
| 2025–2026 | Criciúma | | |
| 2026 | Linense | | |
| 2026– | Gifu | | |
- * Club domestic league appearances and goals

Fábio Vitor Antonio Azevedo Pires (born 4 January 1999), simply known as Fábio Azevedo, is a Brazilian professional footballer who plays as a forward for J3 League side Gifu.

== Career ==
Having played for the youth teams of São Paulo, Portuguesa, Grêmio and Audax-SP, Fábio Azevedo played for clubs such as Audax-RJ, Colorado, Independente-SP, São Bento, and Desportivo Brasil but since 2023, he has not played for a professional team.

In 2025 Azevedo signed with São Caetano and attracted attention by being one of the biggest top scorers in Brazilian football at the beginning of the year, becoming the top scorer in the Série A4 with 13 goals. On September, Azevedo signed with Criciúma.

== Honours ==
Audax Rio

- Campeonato Carioca Série A2: 2021

Grêmio U20

- Copa RS: 2019

Individual

- 2025 Campeonato Paulista Série A4 top scorer: 13 goals
