= 1 Chronicles 14 =

First Book of Chronicles, chapter 14

- ← chapter 13 chapter 15 →
- The complete Hebrew text of the Books of Chronicles (1 and 2 Chronicles) in the Leningrad Codex (1008 CE).
- Book: Books of Chronicles
- Category: Ketuvim
- Christian Bible part: Old Testament
- Order in the Christian part: 13

1 Chronicles 14 is the fourteenth chapter of the Books of Chronicles in the Hebrew Bible or the First Book of Chronicles in the Old Testament of the Christian Bible. The book is compiled from older sources by an unknown person or group, designated by modern scholars as "the Chronicler", and had the final shape established in late fifth or fourth century BCE. This chapter contains the successes of David as he established himself in Jerusalem and defeated the Philistines. The whole chapter belongs to the section focusing on the kingship of David (1 Chronicles 9:35 to 29:30).

== Text ==
This chapter was originally written in the Hebrew language. It is divided into 17 verses.

=== Textual witnesses ===
Some early manuscripts containing the text of this chapter in Hebrew are of the Masoretic Text tradition, which includes the Aleppo Codex (10th century), and Codex Leningradensis (1008).

There is also a translation into Koine Greek known as the Septuagint, made in the last few centuries BCE. Extant ancient manuscripts of the Septuagint version include Codex Vaticanus (B; $\mathfrak{G}$^{B}; 4th century), Codex Sinaiticus (S; BHK: $\mathfrak{G}$^{S}; 4th century), Codex Alexandrinus (A; $\mathfrak{G}$^{A}; 5th century) and Codex Marchalianus (Q; $\mathfrak{G}$^{Q}; 6th century).

=== Old Testament references ===
- 1 Chronicles 14:1–7: 2 Samuel 5:11–16.
- 1 Chronicles 14:4–7: 1 Chronicles 3:5–8.
- 1 Chronicles 14:8–14: 2 Samuel 5:17–25.

== David Established at Jerusalem (14:1–7) ==
This passage emphasizes the greatness of David's reign for the sake of Israel after the transportation of the ark (whereas in 2 Samuel 5, the account was placed after the conquest of Jerusalem). The accumulation of wives and sons is seen as a 'positive sign of stature' in the books of Chronicles (1 Chronicles 25:5; 26:4–5; 2 Chronicles 11:18–23; 13:21; 14:3–7).

=== Verse 1 ===
Now Hiram king of Tyre sent messengers to David, and cedar trees, with masons and carpenters, to build him a house.

- "Hiram" (written (ketiv) as חירם, but read (qere) as חוּרָ֨ם, ḥū-rām): the Phoenician king of Tyre (reigning c. 980–947 BCE). Josephus cited Tyrian court records and the writings of Menander to write that Hiram lived for 53 years and reigned for 34 years, also that the construction of Solomon's Temple began in the twelfth year of Hiram's reign, which was 143 years before the building of Carthage. Hiram's good relation with David is noted in 1 Kings 5:15–26, which continued with Solomon after David's death, again as an equal (אחי, ’ā-ḥî, meaning "my brother"; 1 Kings 9:13; 2 Chronicles 2:2–15; Amos 1:9).

== David Defeats the Philistines (14:8–17) ==
The passage has similar structures as 2 Samuel 5:17–25 ('the advance of the Philistines, an enquiry to God with a positive response and the Philistines' defeat'), with a change of place-name "Geba" to "Gibeon" (verse 16) apparently to fit the perspective of Isaiah 28:21 (which refers to the battles in 2 Samuel 5:25 and Joshua 10:10). The military successes had an astonishing effect of increasing David's fame (and name) internationally, denoting divine blessings for David.

=== Verse 11 ===
So they went up to Baal Perazim, and David defeated them there. Then David said, “God has broken through my enemies by my hand like a breakthrough of water.” Therefore they called the name of that place Baal Perazim.

- "Baal Perazim": literally, "Master of Breakthroughs." YHWH 'has burst out against' the place where the Philistines will be conquered just as he 'burst out against Uzzah' (1 Chronicles 13:11). The same verb "perez" is also used in 1 Chronicles 13:11 (three times) and 15:13 (cf. Exodus 19:22).

=== Verse 16 ===
So David did as God commanded him, and they drove back the army of the Philistines from Gibeon as far as Gezer.

- "Gibeon" (Hebrew: גבעון): written as "Geba" (Hebrew: גֶּ֖בַע) in 2 Samuel 5:25 (following Masoretic, Targum, Syriac, and Arabic), but LXX (Septuagint) reads "Gibeon", which is supported by Isaiah 28:21. Both Gibeon and Geba (if this refers to another existing ancient city) were located north of Jerusalem, so both mentions may be correct, and each mean what it says. The distance between Gibeon and Gezer is about 28 kilometres (17 mi).

== See also ==
- Gezer
- Jerusalem
- Solomon
- Tabernacle
- Related Bible parts: 2 Samuel 5, 1 Chronicles 3, 1 Chronicles 13, 1 Chronicles 15

== Sources ==
- Ackroyd, Peter R (1993). "Chronicles, Books of". In Metzger, Bruce M; Coogan, Michael D (eds.). The Oxford Companion to the Bible. Oxford University Press. pp. 113–116. ISBN 978-0195046458.
- Bennett, William (2018). The Expositor's Bible: The Books of Chronicles. Litres. ISBN 978-5040825196.
- Coogan, Michael David (2007). Coogan, Michael David; Brettler, Marc Zvi; Newsom, Carol Ann; Perkins, Pheme (eds.). The New Oxford Annotated Bible with the Apocryphal/Deuterocanonical Books: New Revised Standard Version, Issue 48 (Augmented 3rd ed.). Oxford University Press. ISBN 9780195288810.
- Endres, John C. (2012). First and Second Chronicles. Liturgical Press. ISBN 9780814628447.
- Gilbert, Henry L (1897). "The Forms of the Names in 1 Chronicles 1-7 Compared with Those in Parallel Passages of the Old Testament". The American Journal of Semitic Languages and Literatures. 13 (4). Liturgical Press: 279–298. doi:10.1086/369250. JSTOR 527992.
- Hill, Andrew E. (2003). First and Second Chronicles. Zondervan. ISBN 9780310206101.
- Mabie, Frederick (2017). "I. The Chronicler's Genealogical Survey of All Israel". In Longman III, Tremper; Garland, David E (eds.). 1 and 2 Chronicles. The Expositor's Bible Commentary. Zondervan. pp. 267–308. ISBN 978-0310531814.
- Mathys, H. P. (2007). "14. 1 and 2 Chronicles". In Barton, John; Muddiman, John (eds.). The Oxford Bible Commentary (first (paperback) ed.). Oxford University Press. pp. 267–308. ISBN 978-0199277186.
- Tuell, Steven S. (2012). First and Second Chronicles. Westminster John Knox Press. ISBN 978-0664238650.
- Würthwein, Ernst (1995). The Text of the Old Testament. Translated by Rhodes, Erroll F. Grand Rapids, MI: William B. Eerdmans. ISBN 0-8028-0788-7.
