= 1 Chronicles 15 =

First Book of Chronicles, chapter 15

- ← chapter 14 chapter 16 →
- The complete Hebrew text of the Books of Chronicles (1 and 2 Chronicles) in the Leningrad Codex (1008 CE).
- Book: Books of Chronicles
- Category: Ketuvim
- Christian Bible part: Old Testament
- Order in the Christian part: 13

1 Chronicles 15 is the fifteenth chapter of the Books of Chronicles in the Hebrew Bible or the First Book of Chronicles in the Old Testament of the Christian Bible. The book was compiled from older sources by an unknown person or group, designated by modern scholars as "the Chronicler", and had the final shape established in late fifth or fourth century BCE. This chapter contains the account of successful transportation of the Ark of the Covenant to the City of David in Jerusalem. The whole chapter belongs to the section focusing on the kingship of David (1 Chronicles 9:35 to 29:30).

== Text ==
This chapter was originally written in the Hebrew language. It is divided into 29 verses.

=== Textual witnesses ===
Some early manuscripts containing the text of this chapter in Hebrew are of the Masoretic Text tradition, which includes the Aleppo Codex (10th century), and Codex Leningradensis (1008).

There is also a translation into Koine Greek known as the Septuagint, made in the last few centuries BCE. Extant ancient manuscripts of the Septuagint version include Codex Vaticanus (B; $\mathfrak{G}$^{B}; 4th century), Codex Sinaiticus (S; BHK: $\mathfrak{G}$^{S}; 4th century), Codex Alexandrinus (A; $\mathfrak{G}$^{A}; 5th century) and Codex Marchalianus (Q; $\mathfrak{G}$^{Q}; 6th century).

=== Old Testament references ===
- 1 Chronicles 15:1–13: 2 Samuel 6:12–15.
- 1 Chronicles 15:29: 2 Samuel 6:16.

== Preparing to move the Ark (15:1–13) ==
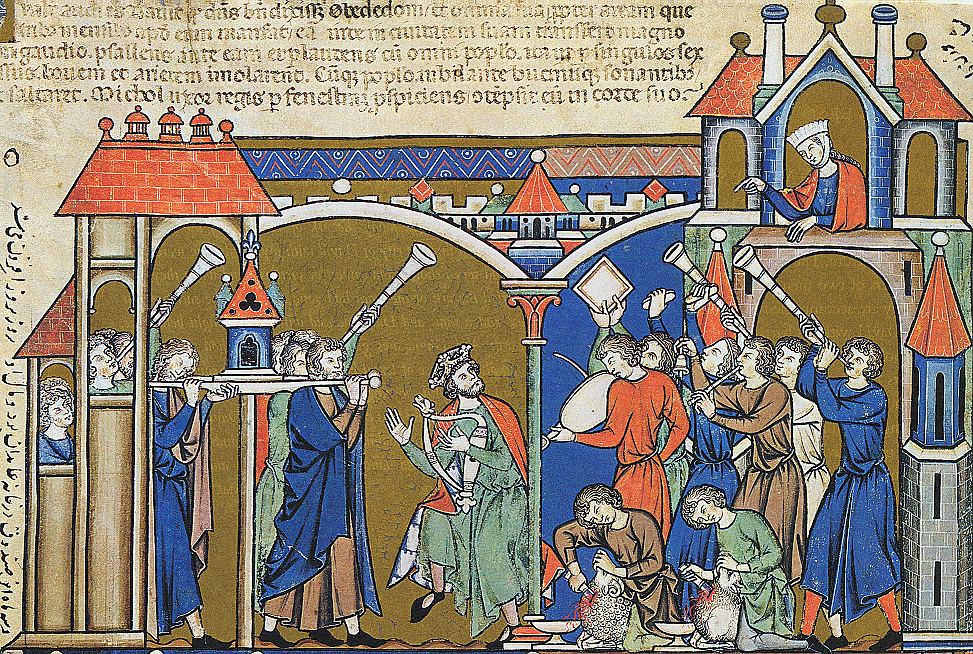
David dances in the presence of the ark. Illustration from the 13th century Morgan Bible.

This section combines the account in 2 Samuel 6:12–15 with a list of participating priests and Levites (verses 4–10) to highlight their roles in carrying the ark ( as prescribed in the Torah: Deuteronomy 10:8; 31:25). The three traditional priest families, Gershom, Kohath, and Merari, listed in a different order, together with the families of Hebron and Uzziel (Kohath's sons according to Exodus 6:18), and Elizaphan. David announced his intentions to the head priests and Levites (verse 11), calling upon them to sanctify themselves (verse 12; cf. Exodus 19:14-15) while referring back to the failed first attempt (verse 13).

=== Verse 11 ===
And David called for Zadok and Abiathar the priests, and for the Levites, for Uriel, Asaiah, and Joel, Shemaiah, and Eliel, and Amminadab,

- "Zadok and Abiathar": two priests who appeared together during the first of part of David's reign (1 Chronicles 15:29, 35; 18:16; 19:11; 20:25); representing the major priestly families ("sons of Aaron").(cf. 1 Chronicles 6:4ff, and 1 Chronicles 24:3). Zadok is always mentioned first as being the descendant of Eleazar the third son of Aaron, while Abiathar (Ahimelech) was descended from Ithamar, the fourth son of Aaron (1 Chronicles 24:1; 1 Chronicles 24:3) through Eli (1 Kings 2:27). The double priesthood came to an end in the reign of Solomon (1 Kings 2:27; 1 Kings 2:35).

=== Verse 13 ===
For because you did not do it the first time, the Lord our God broke out against us, because we did not consult Him about the proper order.”

- " For because you did not do it the first time": could be rendered as "for because on the first occasion it was not you", referring to the heads of the Levitical houses—the first time the ark was carried up by Uzza and Ahio, the sons of Abinadab (2 Samuel 6:3). The phrase "lĕmabbārîshônāh" ("because at the first") is only found here.
- "Broke out against us" is using the verb "perez" (as in 1 Chronicles 13:11 (three times); 14:11; cf. Exodus 19:22).
- "About the proper order" or "regarding the ordinance" from Hebrew: כַּמִּשְׁפָּֽט, ka-mish-pāṭ. The observance of ordinance is noted in 1 Chronicles 15:15, following Numbers 7:9.

== Moving the Ark to Jerusalem (15:14–29) ==
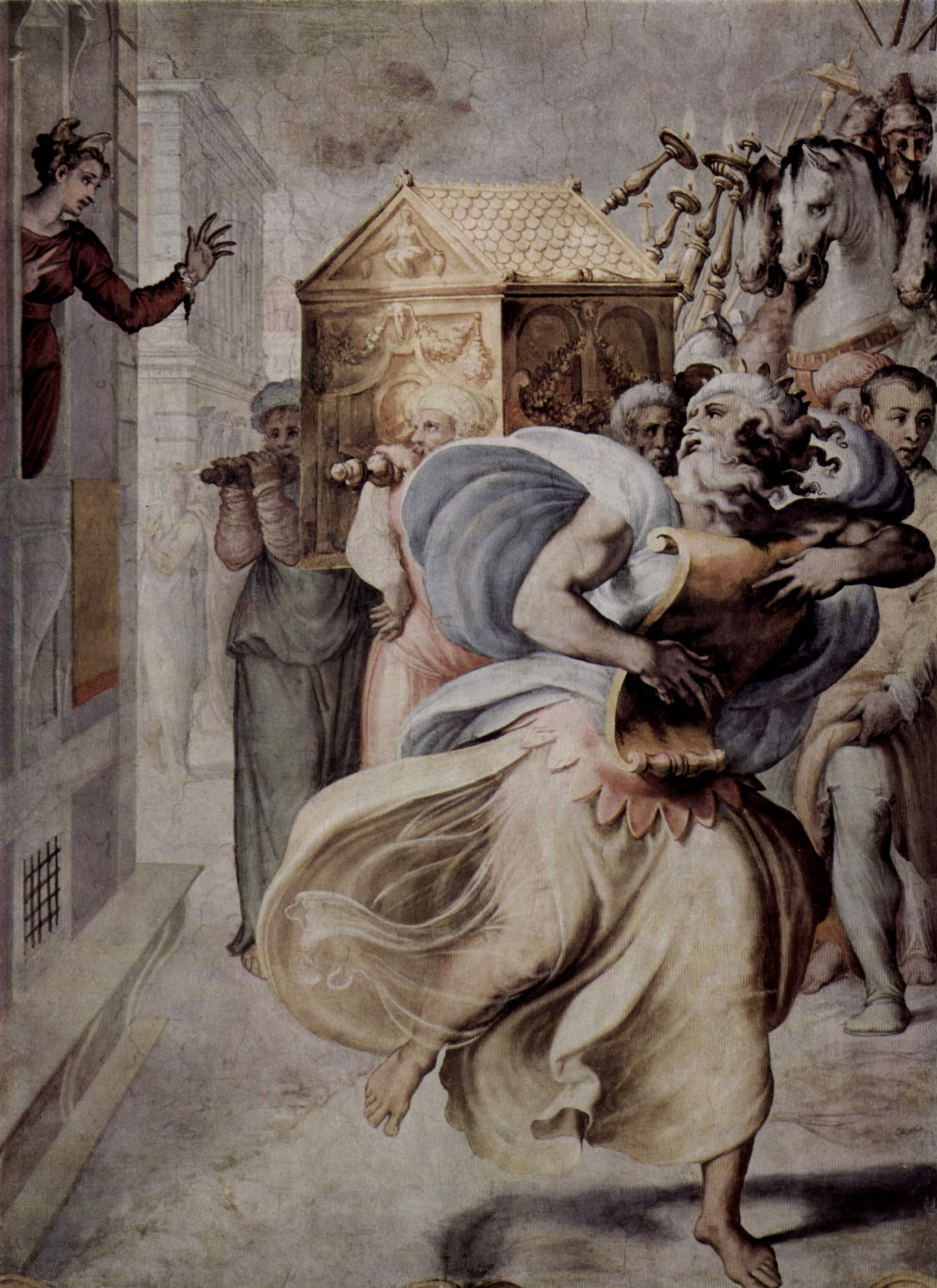
"Michal watches David dance before the ark" by Francesco Salviati (c. 1553)

The passage includes details of Levitical duties (verses 16–24) and the Chronicler emphasizes that the relevant instructions were carried out carefully. Musical instruments are prominently described in this passage (cf. 2 Samuel 6:12–15) as well as in ritual liturgies throughout the Chronicles (1 Chronicles 16:42; 2 Chronicles 5:13; 7:6; 23:13; 34:12). The number of sacrifices corresponds with the contemporary practices (see e.g. Numbers 23:1; Ezekiel 45:23; Job 42:8).

=== Verse 29 ===
And it came to pass, as the ark of the covenant of the Lord came to the city of David, that Michal, the daughter of Saul looking out at a window saw king David dancing and playing: and she despised him in her heart.

- "Michal, the daughter of Saul": is never declared as David's wife in Chronicles. Her showing of contempt for the ark represent the attitude of Saul's family (1 Chronicles 13:3). This verse summarizes 2 Samuel 6:16–23, omitting the mocking of David by Michal.

== Illustration ==
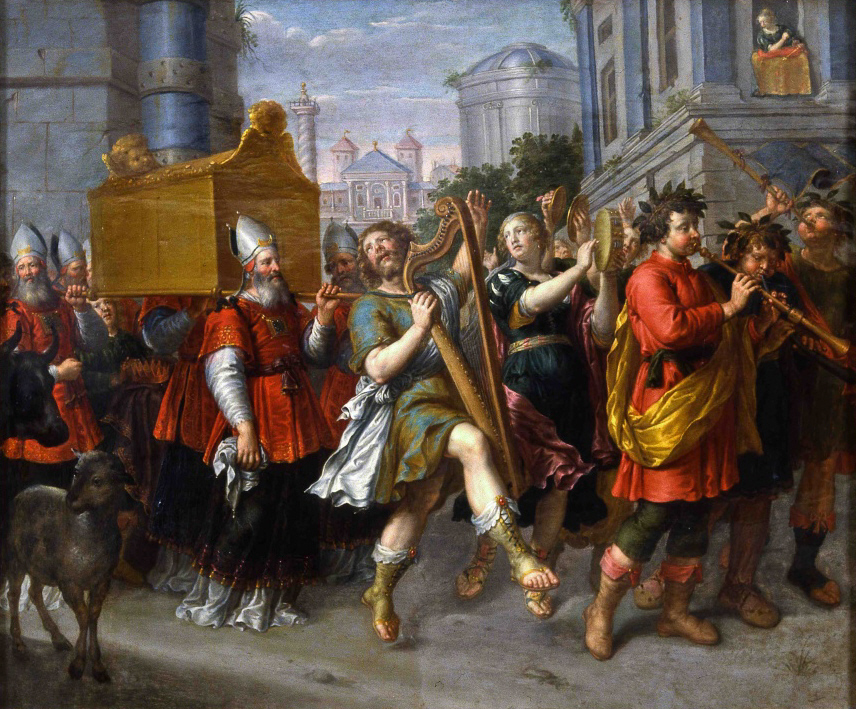
The transportation of the ark as king David dances, by Pieter van Lint (c. 1650)

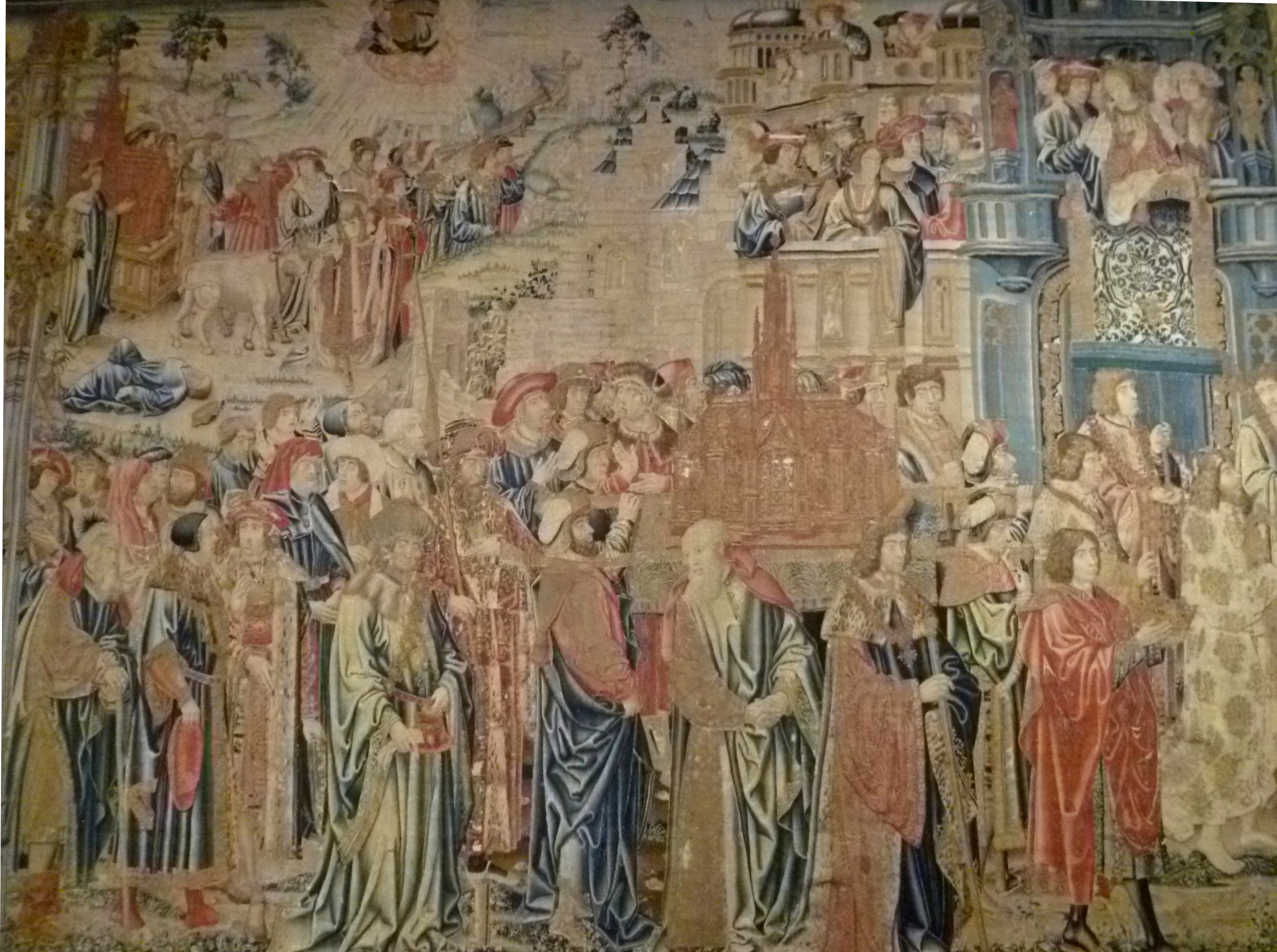
Tapestry: "Entry of the Ark of the Covenant into Jerusalem"; made in Brussels (1515-1525)

== See also ==
- Ark of the Covenant
- Jerusalem
- Solomon
- Tabernacle
- Related Bible parts: Exodus 19, Deuteronomy 10, Deuteronomy 31, Numbers 7, 2 Samuel 6, 1 Chronicles 3, 1 Chronicles 13, 1 Chronicles 14

== Sources ==
- Ackroyd, Peter R (1993). "Chronicles, Books of". In Metzger, Bruce M; Coogan, Michael D (eds.). The Oxford Companion to the Bible. Oxford University Press. pp. 113–116. ISBN 978-0195046458.
- Bennett, William (2018). The Expositor's Bible: The Books of Chronicles. Litres. ISBN 978-5040825196.
- Coogan, Michael David (2007). Coogan, Michael David; Brettler, Marc Zvi; Newsom, Carol Ann; Perkins, Pheme (eds.). The New Oxford Annotated Bible with the Apocryphal/Deuterocanonical Books: New Revised Standard Version, Issue 48 (Augmented 3rd ed.). Oxford University Press. ISBN 9780195288810.
- Endres, John C. (2012). First and Second Chronicles. Liturgical Press. ISBN 9780814628447.
- Gilbert, Henry L (1897). "The Forms of the Names in 1 Chronicles 1-7 Compared with Those in Parallel Passages of the Old Testament". The American Journal of Semitic Languages and Literatures. 13 (4). Liturgical Press: 279–298. doi:10.1086/369250. JSTOR 527992.
- Hill, Andrew E. (2003). First and Second Chronicles. Zondervan. ISBN 9780310206101.
- Mabie, Frederick (2017). "I. The Chronicler's Genealogical Survey of All Israel". In Longman III, Tremper; Garland, David E (eds.). 1 and 2 Chronicles. The Expositor's Bible Commentary. Zondervan. pp. 267–308. ISBN 978-0310531814.
- Mathys, H. P. (2007). "14. 1 and 2 Chronicles". In Barton, John; Muddiman, John (eds.). The Oxford Bible Commentary (first (paperback) ed.). Oxford University Press. pp. 267–308. ISBN 978-0199277186.
- Tuell, Steven S. (2012). First and Second Chronicles. Westminster John Knox Press. ISBN 978-0664238650.
- Würthwein, Ernst (1995). The Text of the Old Testament. Translated by Rhodes, Erroll F. Grand Rapids, MI: William B. Eerdmans. ISBN 0-8028-0788-7.
