= Nachon =

Biblical figure

Nachon (Hebrew Nakon, נָכוֹן, "prepared") was the name of the owner of a threshing-floor, which was nearby to the place where Uzzah was slain.

- 2 Samuel 6:6
- 1 Chronicles 13:9 It is called Kidon's (or Chidon's in some versions) threshing-floor
