= Misael (footballer, born 2002) =

Brazilian footballer

Personal information
- Full name: Misael Messias Nunes Xavier
- Date of birth: 10 June 2002 (age 24)
- Place of birth: Mairiporã, Brazil
- Height: 1.65 m (5 ft 5 in)
- Position: Attacking midfielder

Team information
- Current team: Colorado Caieiras

Youth career
- 2017–2022: Portuguesa

Senior career*
Years	Team	Apps	(Gls)
2021–2023	Portuguesa	3	(0)
2024	Penapolense	2	(0)
2024–	Colorado Caieiras	14	(0)
- * Club domestic league appearances and goals as of 22:47, 5 December 2024 (UTC)

Misael Messias Nunes Xavier (born 10 June 2002), known as Misael Caminhoneiro or just Misael, is a Brazilian footballer who plays as an attacking midfielder for Colorado Caieiras.

== Club career ==
Born in Mairiporã, São Paulo, Misael joined Portuguesa's youth setup in 2017. He made his senior debut for the club on 17 September 2021, coming on as a late substitute for Felipe Souza in a 1–1 away draw against São Caetano, for the year's Copa Paulista.

Back to the under-20 team for the 2022 season, Misael renewed his contract on 14 July of that year. On 17 November 2022, he further extended his link until the end of the 2023 Campeonato Paulista.

Promoted to the first team for the 2023 campaign, Misael played 13 minutes in the season opener, a 2–0 Campeonato Paulista home loss against Botafogo-SP on 14 January.

== Career statistics ==
As of 5 December 2024

Club	Season	League			State League		Cup		Continental		Other		Total	
Club	Season	Division	Apps	Goals	Apps	Goals	Apps	Goals	Apps	Goals	Apps	Goals	Apps	Goals
Portuguesa	2021	Série D	0	0	—		—		—		1 (Note: Appearance(s) in Copa Paulista)	0	1	0
Portuguesa	2023	Paulista	—		3	0	—		—		1	0	4	0
Portuguesa	Total		0	0	3	0	—		—		2	0	5	0
Penapolense	2024	Paulista A4	—		2	0	—		—		—		2	0
Colorado Caieiras	2024	Paulista 2ª Divisão	—		14	0	—		—		—		14	0
Career total			0	0	19	0	0	0	0	0	2	0	21	0
