= Mishael =

Mishael (Hebrew: מישאל, "who is what is God") or Misael may refer to:

== Biblical figures ==
- Mishael (son of Uzziel), cousin of Moses, Aaron, and Miriam
- Original Hebrew name of Meshach

== People ==
=== Misael ===
- Misael (footballer, born 1987), full name Misael Silva Jansen, Brazilian football forward
- Misael (footballer, born 1994), full name Misael Bueno, Brazilian football midfielder
- Misael (footballer, born 2002), full name Misael Messias Nunes Xavier, Brazilian football midfielder

=== Mishael ===
- Mishael Abbott (born 1981), American racing driver
- Mishael Dahan (1920–1997), Sephardic Chief Rabbi of Beersheva
- Mishael Cheshin (1936–2015), Israeli Supreme Court justice
- Mishael Morgan (born 1986), Trinidadian-Canadian actress
- Mishael Powell (born 2001), American football player
- Mishael White, American politician
- Mishael Zion (born 1981), Israeli Rabbi, author and educator
