= Amon of Judah =

King of Judah

Amon
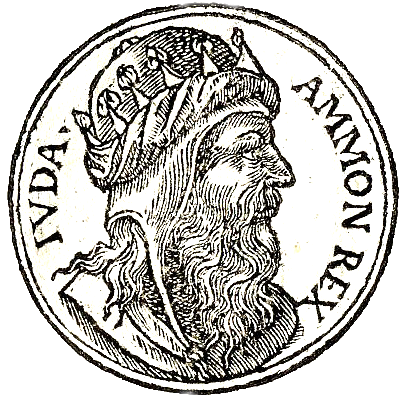
- Amon from Guillaume Rouillé's Promptuarii Iconum Insigniorum, 1553

King of Judah
- Reign: 643/642 – 641/640 BC
- Predecessor: Manasseh
- Successor: Josiah
- Born: c. 664 BC; Judah
- Died: c. 641 BC; Jerusalem
- Burial: 641 BC; Garden of Uzza
- Consort: Jedidah
- Issue: Josiah
- Hebrew: אָמוֹן
- House: House of David
- Father: Manasseh
- Mother: Meshullemeth

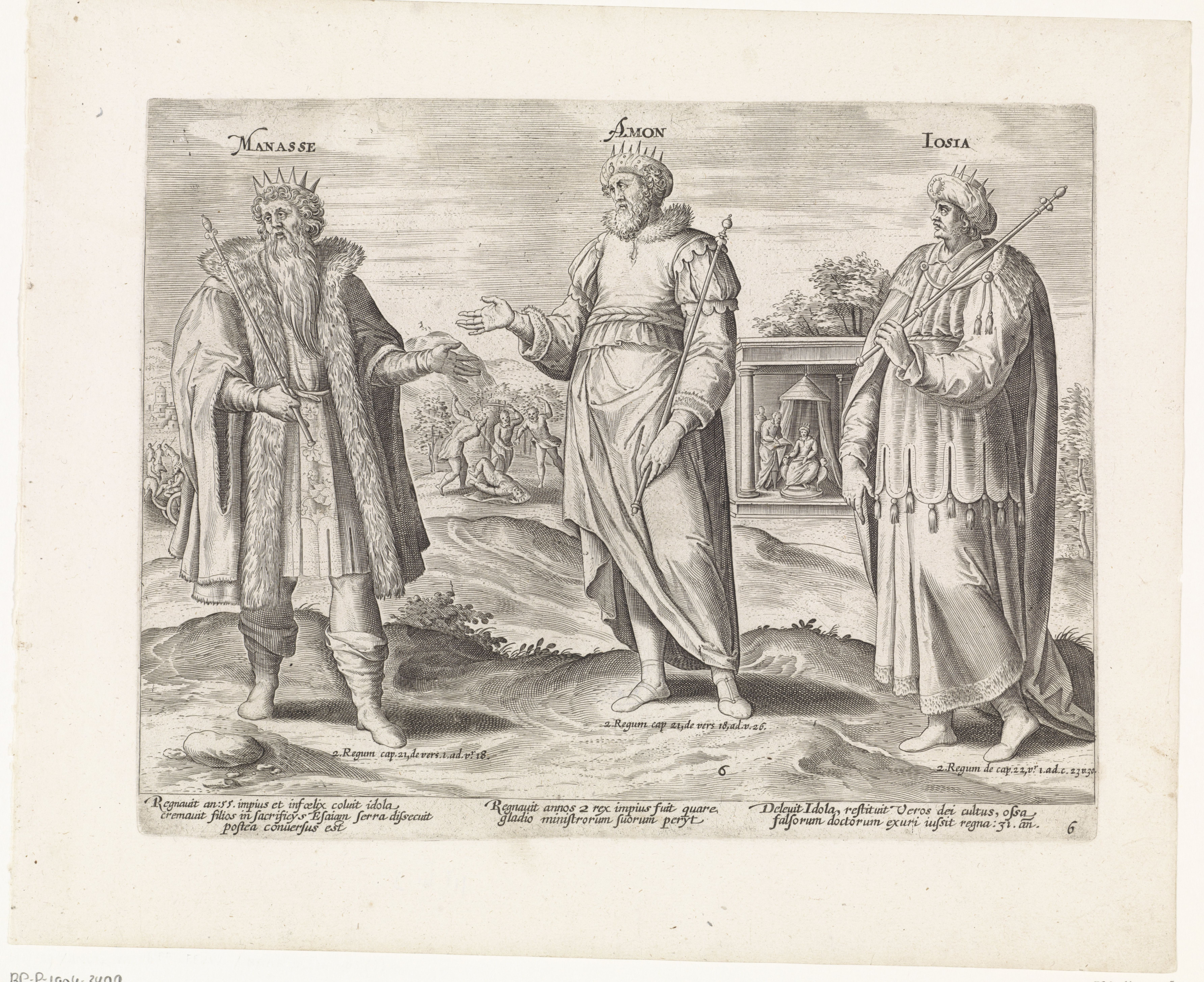
Manasseh, Amon and Josiah (16th century print)

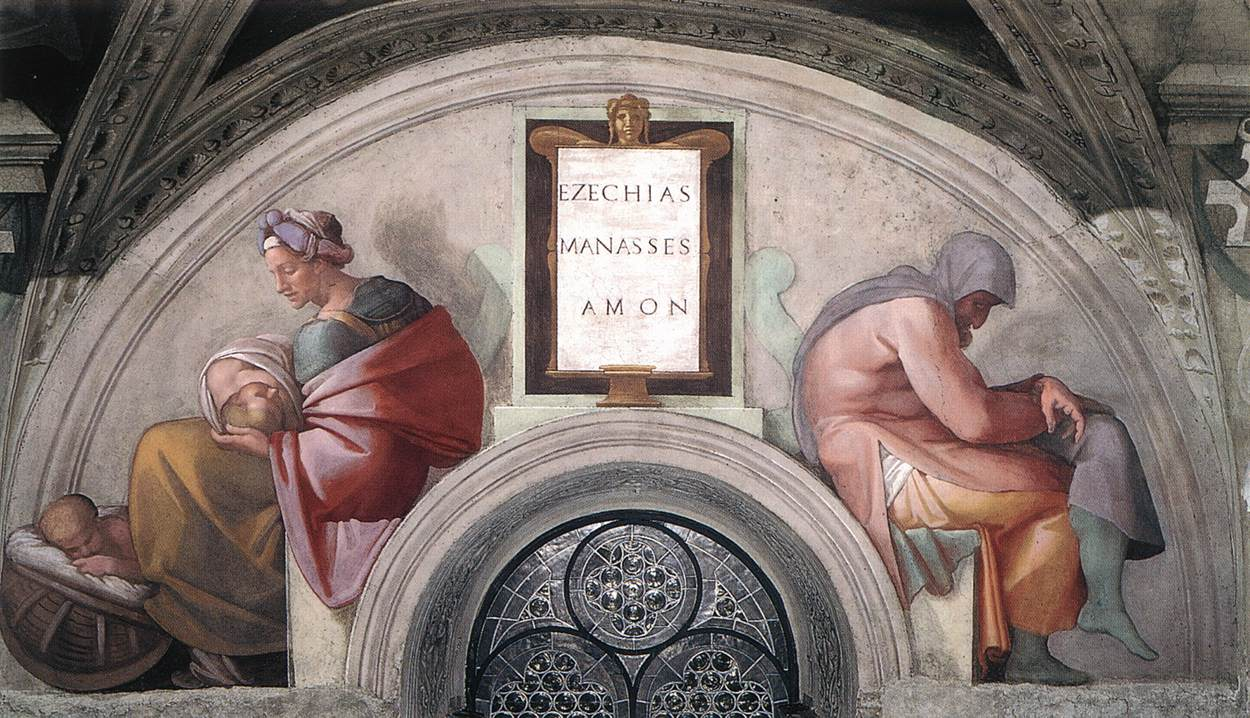
Hezekiah, Manasseh, and Amon, from the Sistine Chapel ceiling.

Amon of Judah (Note: Hebrew: אָמוֹן ’Āmōn; Greek: Αμων; Latin: Amon) was the fifteenth King of Judah who, according to the biblical account, succeeded his father Manasseh of Judah. Amon is most remembered for his idolatrous practices during his short two-year reign, which led to a revolt against him and eventually to his assassination in c. 641 BC.

== Life ==
Amon was the son of King Manasseh of Judah and Meshullemeth, a daughter of Haruz of Jotbah. Although the date is unknown, the Hebrew Bible records that he married Jedidah, the daughter of Adaiah of Bozkath. Following Manasseh's death, Amon began his reign of Judah at the age of 22, and reigned for two years. Unlike many of his predecessors, who appear to have been made a co-regent at the age of 12, his reign does not allow for a period of co-regency, even though his father was at a very high age. This and the age of Manasseh at his birth (44) does suggest he may have been a younger son. The Jerusalem Bible describes Manasseh and Amon as "two wicked kings". Biblical scholar and archeologist William F. Albright has dated his reign to 642–640, while professor E. R. Thiele offers the dates 643/642 – 641/640. Thiele's dates are tied to the reign of Amon's son Josiah, whose death at the hands of Pharaoh Necho II occurred in the summer of 609. The battle in which Josiah is said to have died, which is independently confirmed in Egyptian history, places the end of Amon's reign, 31 years earlier, in 641 or 640 and the beginning of his rule in 643 or 642.

The Hebrew Bible records that Amon continued his father Manasseh's practice of idolatry and set up pagan images as his father had done. II Kings states that Amon "did that which was evil in the sight of Yahweh, as did Manasseh his father. And he walked in all the way that his father walked in, and served the idols that his father served, and worshipped them." Similarly, II Chronicles records that "…he did that which was evil in the sight of the Lord, as did Manasseh his father; and Amon sacrificed unto all the graven images which Manasseh his father had made, and served them." The Talmudic tradition recounts that "Amon burnt the Torah, and allowed spider webs to cover the altar [through complete disuse] ... Amon sinned very much." Like other textual sources, Flavius Josephus too criticizes the reign of Amon, describing his reign in similar terms to the biblical accounts.

Conversely, rather than as lapses from a previous strict Mosaic monotheism, accounting for contemporary domestic and foreign counterparts, Arnold J. Toynbee thinks as nearer to historical truth of Amon as well as Manasseh as pious conservatives, defending the faith of their ancestors.

After reigning two years, Amon was assassinated by his servants or officials, who conspired against him, and he was succeeded by his son Josiah, who at the time was eight years old. After Amon's assassination, his murderers became unpopular with the "people of the land," and they were ultimately killed. It was the people of the land who proclaimed Josiah as his successor; it is not clear what succession would have been anticipated by the officials who assassinated Amon. Some scholars, such as Abraham Malamat, assert that Amon was assassinated because people disliked the heavy influence that the Neo-Assyrian Empire, an age-old enemy of Judah responsible for the Assyrian destruction of the Kingdom of Israel, had upon him.

== Era ==
Amon's reign was in the midst of a transitional time for the Levant and the entire Mesopotamian region. To the east of the Kingdom of Judah, the Neo-Assyrian Empire was beginning to disintegrate while the Neo-Babylonian Empire had not yet risen to replace it. To the west, the Saïte Egypt was still recovering under pharaoh Psamtik I from the Assyrian occupation of 673-63, transforming from a vassal state to an autonomous ally. In this power vacuum, many smaller states such as Judah were able to govern themselves without foreign intervention from larger empires.

== Rabbinic literature ==
The opinion that Amon was the most sinful of all the wicked kings of Judah (2 Chron 33:23) is elaborated on in the Talmud as follows: Ahaz suspended the sacrificial worship and sealed the Torah scrolls; Manasseh burned the names of the Lord and tore down the altar; Amon made it a place of desolation [covered it with cobwebs] and burned the Torah scrolls; (Note: This detail is apparently derived from the story of the finding of Torah scroll in the reign of Amon's son Josiah (2 Kings 22:8), suggesting that such scrolls had to be hidden earlier.) Ahaz permitted incest; Manasseh committed it with his sister; Amon committed it with his mother, saying to her, "I only did this to anger the Creator". And yet, out of respect for his son Josiah, Amon's name was not placed on the list of the kings excluded from the world to come.

The sages also explain Proverbs 24:30 as follows:

"I passed by the field of a lazy man" - this is Ahaz. "And the vineyard of a senseless man" - this is Manasseh. "And behold, it was all overgrown with thorns" - this is Amon. "And its surface was covered with nettle" - this is Jehoiakim. "And its stone wall was broken down" - this is a reference to Zedekiah, in whose days the Temple was destroyed.

A midrashic fragment preserved in the Apostolic Constitutions, 2:23, which appears to follow an account of the repentance of Manasseh according to a lost Jewish apocryphal writing, reads:

"No sin is more grievous than idolatry, for it is treason against God. Yet even this has been forgiven upon sincere repentance; but he that sins from a mere spirit of opposition, to see whether God will punish the wicked, shall find no pardon, although he say in his heart, 'I shall have peace in the end (by repenting), though I walk in the stubbornness of my evil heart'" (Deut. xxix. 19). Such a one was Amon, the son of Manasseh, for the (Apocryphal) Scripture says: "And Amon reasoned an evil reasoning of transgression and said: 'My father from his childhood was a great transgressor, and he repented in his old age. So will I now walk after the lust of my soul and afterward return to the Lord.' And he committed more evil in the sight of the Lord than all that were before him; but the Lord God speedily cut him off from this good land. And his servants conspired against him and slew him in his own house, and he reigned two years only."

This midrashic fragment casts light upon the emphatic teaching of the Mishnah (Yoma, 8:9): "Whosoever says, 'I will sin and repent thereafter,' will not be granted the time for repentance." Similarly, according to Louis Ginzburg, "...For repentance [Amon] was given no time, for death cut him off in the fullness of his sinful ways".

== In Christianity ==
In the Gospel of Matthew, Amon appears in the genealogy of Jesus.

== See also ==
- Kings of Judah
- Kingdom of Judah

== Notes ==
Amon of Judah House of David
Preceded by Manasseh	King of Judah; 643–641 BC	Succeeded by Josiah
