= Bozkath =

Biblical city in the Kingdom of Judah

Bozkath (Hebrew בצקת; boṣqaṯ) was a town in the Kingdom of Judah mentioned in the Hebrew Bible/Old Testament. The town was located in the lowland hills of Judah, otherwise known as the Shephelah, but its precise location is unknown.

== Ancient name ==
The toponym Bozkath is derived from the root בצק, meaning "elevation". In the Greek versions of the Hebrew Bible, Bozkath is transcribed as Βασηδωθ in LXX-A but is written Βαζκαθ in LXX-B.

== References in Biblical literature ==
Bozkath is mentioned in the Hebrew Bible, Joshua 15:39, as part of the Tribe of Judah's inheritance. The roster of towns in Joshua 15 is commonly thought to reflect an administrative document that originated during the Kingdom of Judah. This list divides the Iron Age kingdom into four regions, the Shephelah, the Negeb, the wilderness, and the highlands; Bozkath is listed in the Shephelah after the better known town of Lachish and before Eglon). A queen of Judah, Jedidah the daughter of Adaiah, was from Bozkath (2 Kings 22:1). With the assassination of her husband Amon of Judah, her son Josiah was placed on the throne by the people of the land. Biblical scholars have suggested Josiah's enthronement by this enigmatic group, the people of the land, implies that Josiah had a strong connection to the rural hinterland of Judah through his mother's family and Bozkath.

== Location and identification ==
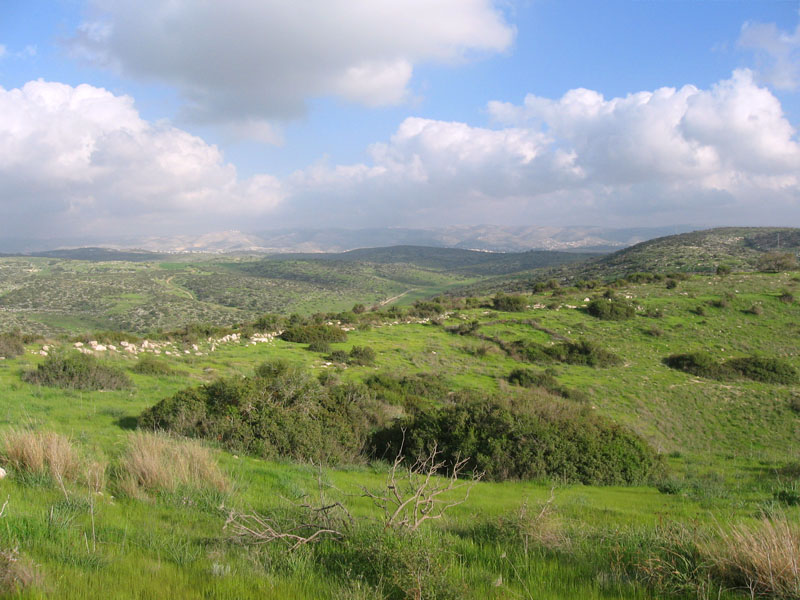
The Shephelah, east of Lachish.

The town of Bozkath is listed along with sixteen other towns and related settlements in the third district of the Shephelah of Judah (Josh 15:61–62), in the southern part of the lowland hills. F.-M. Abel had located Bozkath at the site of ed-Dawa'ime, which is located southeast of Lachish by roughly 15 km., however this identification is not followed today. Based on the identification of Lachish with Tell ed-Duweir and the plausible identification of Eglon with Tell Aitun to the east, Bozkath's position between both towns may suggest that it is located in the southeastern Shephelah. Beyond this general observation, it is not possible to suggest a more precise location for Bozkath with any certainty.
