= 1 Chronicles 12 =

First Book of Chronicles, chapter 12

- ← chapter 11 chapter 13 →
- The complete Hebrew text of the Books of Chronicles (1 and 2 Chronicles) in the Leningrad Codex (1008 CE).
- Book: Books of Chronicles
- Category: Ketuvim
- Christian Bible part: Old Testament
- Order in the Christian part: 13

1 Chronicles 12 is the twelfth chapter of the Books of Chronicles in the Hebrew Bible or the First Book of Chronicles in the Old Testament of the Christian Bible. The book is compiled from older sources by an unknown person or group, designated by modern scholars as "the Chronicler", and had the final shape established in late fifth or fourth century BCE. This chapter contains the list of people who joined David: before his coronation (verses 1–22) and after he was made king in Hebron (verses 23–40). The whole chapter belongs to the section focusing on the kingship of David (1 Chronicles 9:35 to 29:30).

== Text ==
This chapter was originally written in the Hebrew language. It is divided into 40 verses.

=== Textual witnesses ===
Some early manuscripts containing the text of this chapter in Hebrew are of the Masoretic Text tradition, which includes the Aleppo Codex (10th century), and Codex Leningradensis (1008).

There is also a translation into Koine Greek known as the Septuagint, made in the last few centuries BCE. Extant ancient manuscripts of the Septuagint version include Codex Vaticanus (B; $\mathfrak{G}$^{B}; 4th century), Codex Sinaiticus (S; BHK: $\mathfrak{G}$^{S}; 4th century), Codex Alexandrinus (A; $\mathfrak{G}$^{A}; 5th century) and Codex Marchalianus (Q; $\mathfrak{G}$^{Q}; 6th century).

== Structure ==
1 Chronicles 11 and 12 combine a 'variety of chronologically and geographically disparate lists' to establish the unity of "all Israel" (north and south), with their unanimous recognition of David's kingship. The outer framework consists of David's anointing at Hebron (1 Chronicles 11:1–3; 12:38–40) to enclose the lists of the warriors who attended the festivities (11:10–47; 12:23–38). The inner framework comprises the lists of David's forces while at Ziklag (12:1–7; 12:19–22) to enclose the warriors who joined him at “the stronghold” (12:8–18).

== The mighty men join David (12:1–22) ==
The first set of lists of the chapter contains the warriors joining David before he became king. It divides into four sections: the Benjaminites who came to David in Ziklag (verses 1–8); the Gadites who came to David's mountain stronghold (verses 9–16), as well as the people of Benjamin and Judah (verses 17–19); the people of Manasseh came to David in Ziklag (verses 20–22). Although only four tribes were mentioned, the structure clearly points to the conclusion in verse 22, that David got much support. The account of Manassites summarizes some incidents in 1 Samuel 28–30.

=== Verses 1–2 ===
^{1}Now these are they that came to David to Ziklag, while he yet kept himself close because of Saul the son of Kish: and they were among the mighty men, helpers of the war. ^{2}They were armed with bows, and could use both the right hand and the left in hurling stones and shooting arrows out of a bow, even of Saul's brethren of Benjamin.

This passage suggests that some people of Benjamin defected to David while Saul was still reigning (cf. 2 Samuel 2:12–32).

- "Ziklag": located within the territory of Judah allotted to the tribe of Simeon (Joshua 19:5; 1 Chronicles 4:30). During Saul's reign, the Philistines apparently seized it, so their king, Achish of Gath, could give it to David, who set his headquarters in that place for sixteen months until the death of Saul (1 Samuel 27:6–7; 1 Samuel 30).

=== Verses 3-4 ===
3 The chief was Ahiezer, then Joash, the sons of Shemaah the Gibeathite; and Jeziel and Pelet, the sons of Azmaveth, and Beracah and Jehu the Anathothite,
4 and Ishmaiah the Gibeonite, a mighty man among the thirty, and over the thirty. Then Jeremiah, Jahaziel, Johanan, Jozabad the Gederathite,

=== Verse 18 ===
Then the Spirit clothed Amasai, chief of the thirty, and he said,

“We are yours, O David,

and with you, O son of Jesse!

Peace, peace to you,

and peace to your helpers!
For your God helps you.”

Then David received them and made them officers of his troops.

Amasai's prophetic words, with "peace" (Hebrew: שָׁל֜וֹם, shā-lōm) mentioned three times, speak of David's closeness with his supporters at the beginning of his rise to power. This relationship would be dissolved when the kingdom was divided in the time of Rehoboam's reign (2 Chronicles 10:16).

- "The thirty": is translated from the original Hebrew word השלושים, which in Masoretic tradition is written (ketiv) with punctuation as הַשָּׁלִישִׁים֒, ha-shə-lō-shîm (meaning "thirty"), but read (qere) as הַשָּׁלִישִׁים֒, ha-shā-lî-shîm (meaning "captains" or "officers"). Nadav Na'aman shows that the reading as "shālîsh" ("officer") is the correct understanding and clarifies problems in interpreting 2 Samuel 23:8–39, 1 Chronicles 11:10–41 and related passages, following the interpretation of B. A. Mastin that "shālîshîm" are 'high-ranking officers who were called "of the third rank" simply because they came after the king and his senior officers'.

=== Verse 19 ===
And some from Manasseh defected to David when he was going with the Philistines to battle against Saul; but they did not help them, for the lords of the Philistines sent him away by agreement, saying, "He may defect to his master Saul and endanger our heads."

The battle between Saul and the Philistines was mentioned in chapter 10 and the case of David not involved in that battle was summarized from 1 Samuel 29:1–30.

== David's army at Hebron (12:23–40) ==
The subsequent list is bracketed by brief accounts of David's coronation in Hebron (verses 23, 38–40); structured as a kind of military census. David was accepted as king by all people with all their hearts (verse 38), followed by great feasts of joy, unique to the Chronicles (cf. e.g. 1 Chronicles 29:22; 2 Chronicles 30:21–6). The three-day celebration involves many foodstuffs brought by donkeys, mules, camels and oxen from three northern tribes: Issachar, Zebulun and Naphtali, such as bread, fig-cakes, raisins and wine. The mood is described in the word "joy" (or "rejoicing"; verse 40) which later appears in Hezekiah's Passover festival (2 Chronicles 30:23, 26) and post-exilic worship festivals (Nehemiah 8:12, 17; Nehemiah 12:43).

=== Verse 23 ===
And these are the numbers of the bands that were ready armed to the war, and came to David to Hebron, to turn the kingdom of Saul to him, according to the word of the Lord.

Saul's kingdom was passed on peacefully to David in Hebron (cf. 1 Chronicles 10:14–11:3).

== See also ==
- David's Mighty Warriors
- Hebron
- Jerusalem
- Ziklag
- Related Bible parts: 1 Samuel 27, 1 Samuel 30, 2 Samuel 2, 1 Chronicles 10, 1 Chronicles 11, 1 Chronicles 29

== Sources ==
- Ackroyd, Peter R (1993). "Chronicles, Books of". In Metzger, Bruce M; Coogan, Michael D (eds.). The Oxford Companion to the Bible. Oxford University Press. pp. 113–116. ISBN 978-0195046458.
- Bennett, William (2018). The Expositor's Bible: The Books of Chronicles. Litres. ISBN 978-5040825196.
- Coogan, Michael David (2007). Coogan, Michael David; Brettler, Marc Zvi; Newsom, Carol Ann; Perkins, Pheme (eds.). The New Oxford Annotated Bible with the Apocryphal/Deuterocanonical Books: New Revised Standard Version, Issue 48 (Augmented 3rd ed.). Oxford University Press. ISBN 9780195288810.
- Endres, John C. (2012). First and Second Chronicles. Liturgical Press. ISBN 9780814628447.
- Hill, Andrew E. (2003). First and Second Chronicles. Zondervan. ISBN 9780310206101.
- Mabie, Frederick (2017). "I. The Chronicler's Genealogical Survey of All Israel". In Longman III, Tremper; Garland, David E (eds.). 1 and 2 Chronicles. The Expositor's Bible Commentary. Zondervan. pp. 267–308. ISBN 978-0310531814.
- Mathys, H. P. (2007). "14. 1 and 2 Chronicles". In Barton, John; Muddiman, John (eds.). The Oxford Bible Commentary (first (paperback) ed.). Oxford University Press. pp. 267–308. ISBN 978-0199277186.
- Na'aman, Nadav (1988). "The List of David's Officers (šālîšîm)". Vetus Testamentum. 38 (1): 71–79. doi:10.2307/1518123. JSTOR 1518123.
- Tuell, Steven S. (2012). First and Second Chronicles. Westminster John Knox Press. ISBN 978-0664238650.
- Würthwein, Ernst (1995). The Text of the Old Testament. Translated by Rhodes, Erroll F. Grand Rapids, MI: William B. Eerdmans. ISBN 0-8028-0788-7.
