= Obed-Edom =

Biblical name

The name Obed-Edom (/ˈoʊbɛd ˈɛdəm/, hebr.: עֹבֵד אֱדֹם) refers to several people in the Biblical books of 2 Samuel and 1 and 2 Chronicles in the context of guarding the Ark of the Covenant and the Temple. The relationship between the occurrences of the name has been the subject of scholarly discussions.

== Obed-Edom as Keeper of the Ark ==
In 2 Samuel 6 and 1 Chronicles 13 the Israelite king David decides to move the Ark of the Covenant from the "house of Abinadab", where it had been kept for twenty years following its return from the Philistines, to his new stronghold in Jerusalem. The ark is placed on an ox-cart driven by Uzzah and Ahio, Abinadab's sons, in a festive atmosphere (2 Samuel 6:3–5). At one point, the ark rocks violently as the oxen pull it, and Uzzah sticks out his hand to steady the Ark, and so God strikes Uzzah dead (2 Samuel 6:7). David temporarily abandons his plan to move the ark to his city.

David was afraid of the Lord that day; and he said, “How can the ark of the Lord come to me?” So David would not move the ark of the Lord with him into the City of David; but David took it aside into the house of Obed-Edom the Gittite. The ark of the Lord remained in the house of Obed-Edom the Gittite three months. And the Lord blessed Obed-Edom and all his household. (2 Samuel 6:9–11)

When David hears that God has blessed the house of Obed-edom, he decides to move the Ark to Jerusalem as originally planned. (2 Samuel 6:12)

Rev. F. Gardiner, in Ellicott's Commentary for Modern Readers, stresses that "this implies neither jealousy nor a wish to deprive his subject (Obed-edom) of a blessing. It had been his original purpose to carry the ark to Jerusalem, and he had only desisted in a fit of vexation and then of fear. He now saw that such fear was groundless, and went on to the completion of his unfinished action."

== Obed-Edom in temple service ==
1 Chronicles 15–16 relates how David, in light of the incident with Uzzah, charged the Levites with carrying the Ark into Jerusalem and also organises regular worship in front of the Ark. In this context, Obed-Edom is mentioned among the "gatekeeepers" (1 Chronicles 15:18, 1 Chronicles 15:24, 1 Chronicles 16:37–42) and as a musician (1 Chronicles 15:21, 1 Chronicles 16:5).

According to 1 Chronicles 26:12–19, the duties of gatekeepers in Temple were assigned by lots: the lot assigned "to Obed-Edom the South Gate, and to his sons the storehouse" (1 Chronicles 26:15)

== Genealogical information ==
1 Chronicles 16:37–42 identify Obed-Edom as a "son of Jeduthun".

The genealogies in 1 Chronicles 26 provide genealogical information when it introduces a list of doorkeepers, beginning with Korahites and a man named Meshelemiah and his sons (1 Chronicles 26:1–3), and then proceeding with:

Moreover the sons of Obed-Edom were Shemaiah the firstborn, Jehozabad the second, Joah the third, Sacar the fourth, Nethanel the fifth, Ammiel the sixth, Issachar the seventh, Peulthai the eighth; for God blessed him. Also to Shemaiah his son were sons born who governed their fathers’ houses, because they were men of great ability. The sons of Shemaiah were Othni, Rephael, Obed, and Elzabad, whose brothers Elihu and Semachiah were able men. All these were of the sons of Obed-Edom, they and their sons and their brethren, able men with strength for the work: sixty-two of Obed-Edom. (1 Chronicles 26:4–8)

=== Scholarly views ===
Several scholars have noted the existence of uncertainties and disagreements about the Obed-Edom passages. However, most scholars agree that in the name "Obed-Edom the Gittite", (as he is called in 2 Samuel 6 and 1 Chronicles 13) the term "Gittite" refers originally to a Philistine (and therefore a non-Israelite man). However, in Chronicles "Obed-edom is assigned a levitical pedigree", that is, is described as a Levite, an Israelite member of the tribe entrusted with holy responsibilities. This description as a Levite is "usually regarded as the Chronicler's own interpretation." As a result of these differing interpretations, several scholars have proposed that the Chronicler has altered the original description of a Philistine Obed-edom in order to make the character a Levite. Other scholars point out that "Gittite" may refers simply to the town of Gath, not to the nationality of the individual. David had recently been given sanctuary in Gath by Achish, king of Gath (1 Samuel 27:3), and yet it would be erroneous to conclude that David was somehow therefore a Philistine. Moreover, Gath was one of the original Levitical cities, given to the Kohathites (Joshua 21:24), from whose family Obed-Edom was descended. Therefore, his residence in this contested city is not surprising.

== Obed-Edom under King Amaziah of Judah ==
A man called Obed-Edom also appears in 2 Chronicles 25:21–24 during the reign of Jehoash of Israel and Amaziah of Judah, approximately 800-775 BCE. The account relates that Jehoash attacked Amaziah, and came to Jerusalem, and "took all the gold and silver, all the articles that were found in the house of God with Obed-Edom, the treasures of the king’s house, and hostages, and returned to Samaria." (2 Chronicles 25:24)
