= Adaiah =

Several individuals mentioned in the Hebrew Bible

Adaiah (/əˈdeɪjə/) was the name of eight individuals mentioned in the Hebrew Bible. The name means "Yahweh passes by."

1. Adaiah, the father of Queen Jedidah. He was of Boscath, a town in the Kingdom of Judah mentioned in the Hebrew Scriptures. His grandson was king Josiah of Judah.
2. An Adaiah mentioned in passing as the ancestor of a Levite named Asaph, in 1 Chronicles 6:41 (counted as 6:26 in some Bibles).
3. An Adaiah mentioned in 1 Chronicles 8:21 as being the son of a Shimei in a Benjamite genealogy.
4. A priest listed in 1 Chronicles 9:12 and Nehemiah 11:12. According to Cheyne and Black, it is possible that this same priest should appear in Nehemiah 12:6 or 7, but has been removed by a scribal error that left the name "Jedaiah" in its place.
5. A descendant of Bani, listed in Ezra 10:29.
6. Another descendant of Bani, listed in Ezra 10:39.
7. An Adaiah, son of Joiarib, listed in Nehemiah 11:5.
8. An Adaiah mentioned as being the father of Maaseiah in 2 Chronicles 23:1.
