= 1 Chronicles 11 =

First Book of Chronicles, chapter 11

- ← chapter 10 chapter 12 →
- The complete Hebrew text of the Books of Chronicles (1 and 2 Chronicles) in the Leningrad Codex (1008 CE).
- Book: Books of Chronicles
- Category: Ketuvim
- Christian Bible part: Old Testament
- Order in the Christian part: 13

1 Chronicles 11 is the eleventh chapter of the Books of Chronicles in the Hebrew Bible or the First Book of Chronicles in the Old Testament of the Christian Bible. The book is compiled from older sources by an unknown person or group, designated by modern scholars as "the Chronicler", and had the final shape established in late fifth or fourth century BCE. This chapter contains the accounts of David's installation as the king of Israel, the conquest of Jerusalem, and a list of David's heroes. The whole chapter belongs to the section focusing on the kingship of David (1 Chronicles 9:35 to 29:30).

== Text ==
This chapter was originally written in the Hebrew language. It is divided into 47 verses.

=== Textual witnesses ===
Some early manuscripts containing the text of this chapter in Hebrew are of the Masoretic Text tradition, which includes the Aleppo Codex (10th century), and Codex Leningradensis (1008).

There is also a translation into Koine Greek known as the Septuagint, made in the last few centuries BCE. Extant ancient manuscripts of the Septuagint version include Codex Vaticanus (B; $\mathfrak{G}$^{B}; 4th century), Codex Sinaiticus (S; BHK: $\mathfrak{G}$^{S}; 4th century), Codex Alexandrinus (A; $\mathfrak{G}$^{A}; 5th century) and Codex Marchalianus (Q; $\mathfrak{G}$^{Q}; 6th century).

=== Old Testament references ===
- 1 Chronicles 11:1–3: 2 Samuel 5:1–5.
- 1 Chronicles 11:4–9: 2 Samuel 5:6–10.
- 1 Chronicles 11:10–47: 2 Samuel 23:8–39.

== Structure ==
1 Chronicles 11 and 12 combine a 'variety of chronologically and geographically disparate lists' to establish the unity of "all Israel" (north and south), with their unanimous recognition of David's kingship. The outer framework consists of David's anointing at Hebron (1 Chronicles 11:1–3; 12:38–40) to enclose the lists of the warriors who attended the festivities (11:10–47; 12:23–38). The inner framework comprises the lists of David's forces while at Ziklag (12:1–7; 12:19–22) to enclose the warriors who joined him at “the stronghold” (12:8–18).

== David, king of Israel (11:1–3) ==
The report concerning David's crowning in Hebron can be found in the books of Samuel, but the Chronicler also add some notes.

=== Verse 1 ===
Then all Israel gathered together to David at Hebron and said, “Behold, we are your bone and flesh."

- "All Israel": a more 'inclusive view' as a nation than "the tribes of Israel" in 2 Samuel 5:1.

=== Verse 2 ===
"Also, in time past, even when Saul was king, you were the one who led Israel out and brought them in; and the Lord your God said to you, ‘You shall shepherd My people Israel, and be ruler over My people Israel.’"

This is the only place in the Chronicles that Saul was stated as king.

=== Verse 3 ===
So all the elders of Israel came to the king at Hebron, and David made a covenant with them at Hebron before the Lord. And they anointed David king over Israel, according to the word of the Lord by Samuel.

- "According to the word of the Lord by Samuel": may refer to 2 Samuel 7:7–8 (cf. 1 Chronicles 17:6–7) as well as recall 1 Samuel 15:28 and 1 Samuel 16:1–13.

== David conquers Jerusalem (11:4–9) ==
The section is a rework of the report in 2 Samuel 5:6–10, with the removal of obscure and unclear terms and insertion of unique details, such as the role of Joab in Jerusalem's capture.

=== Verse 6 ===
Now David said, “Whoever attacks the Jebusites first shall be chief and captain.” And Joab the son of Zeruiah went up first, and became chief.

- "Chief": literally "head".

This verse contains a play on words: whoever attack "first" (Hebrew: רִאשׁוֹן, rishon) will be "chief" (Hebrew: רֹאשׁ, rosh), Joab went up "first" and became "chief", although he was not listed among David's mighty men (1 Chronicles 11:10–(12:40).

== David's mighty men (11:10–47) ==
Verses 10–41 conform with 2 Samuel 23:8–39 (with some spelling differences), whereas verses 42–47 are unique to the Chronicles. Without clear historical context, it is unclear whether the list refers to the period before or after David's accession to the throne. This passage consists of three parts (similar to the list in 2 Samuel):

1. The three men (whom nobody could match), each with one act of heroism. The Chronicler omits the name of the third hero and states acts of heroism differently
2. Two other heroes, with their particular acts of heroism.
3. The 'thirty' heroes.

The purpose of the list is to portray David as a 'divinely chosen leader' with strong support from various groups in northern and southern Israel.

=== Verse 10 ===
Now these are the chiefs of David's mighty men, who gave him strong support in his kingdom, together with all Israel, to make him king, according to the word of the Lord concerning Israel.

Here and in 1 Chronicles 12:23 the Chronicler underlines that David's kingdom encompasses all Israel as a fulfillment of YHWH's pledge to Israel, although this promise is not directly cited,

== See also ==
- Bethlehem
- Hebron
- Jerusalem
- Uriah the Hittite
- Related Bible parts: 1 Samuel 16, 2 Samuel 5, 2 Samuel 12, 2 Samuel 23, 1 Chronicles 12

== Sources ==
- Ackroyd, Peter R (1993). "Chronicles, Books of". In Metzger, Bruce M; Coogan, Michael D (eds.). The Oxford Companion to the Bible. Oxford University Press. pp. 113–116. ISBN 978-0195046458.
- Bennett, William (2018). The Expositor's Bible: The Books of Chronicles. Litres. ISBN 978-5040825196.
- Coogan, Michael David (2007). Coogan, Michael David; Brettler, Marc Zvi; Newsom, Carol Ann; Perkins, Pheme (eds.). The New Oxford Annotated Bible with the Apocryphal/Deuterocanonical Books: New Revised Standard Version, Issue 48 (Augmented 3rd ed.). Oxford University Press. ISBN 9780195288810.
- Endres, John C. (2012). First and Second Chronicles. Liturgical Press. ISBN 9780814628447.
- Hill, Andrew E. (2003). First and Second Chronicles. Zondervan. ISBN 9780310206101.
- Mabie, Frederick (2017). "I. The Chronicler's Genealogical Survey of All Israel". In Longman III, Tremper; Garland, David E (eds.). 1 and 2 Chronicles. The Expositor's Bible Commentary. Zondervan. pp. 267–308. ISBN 978-0310531814.
- Mathys, H. P. (2007). "14. 1 and 2 Chronicles". In Barton, John; Muddiman, John (eds.). The Oxford Bible Commentary (first (paperback) ed.). Oxford University Press. pp. 267–308. ISBN 978-0199277186.
- Tuell, Steven S. (2012). First and Second Chronicles. Westminster John Knox Press. ISBN 978-0664238650.
- Würthwein, Ernst (1995). The Text of the Old Testament. Translated by Rhodes, Erroll F. Grand Rapids, MI: William B. Eerdmans. ISBN 0-8028-0788-7.
