= Baale of Judah =

City in the tribe of Judah

Baale of Judah, meaning "lords of Judah" or "citizens of Judah" was a city in the tribe of Judah from which David brought the ark into Jerusalem. In 1 Chronicles 13:6, the city is called Kirjath-jearim. According to Wilhelm Gesenius, the town of Baale of Judah is referred to not only as Kirjath-Jearim but also as Baalah.
