= Ahio =

Ahio - brotherly.

1. One of the sons of Beriah (biblical figure) (1 Chr. 8:14).
2. One of the sons of Jehiel the Gibeonite (1 Chr. 8:31; 9:37).
3. One of the other sons of Abinadab, father of Eleazar. While his brother Uzzah went by the side of the Ark of the Covenant, Ahio walked before it guiding the oxen which drew the cart on which it was carried, after having brought it from his father's house in Gibeah (1 Chr. 13:7; 2 Sam. 6:3, 4).
