= Uzzah =

Biblical figure who died from touching the Ark of the Covenant

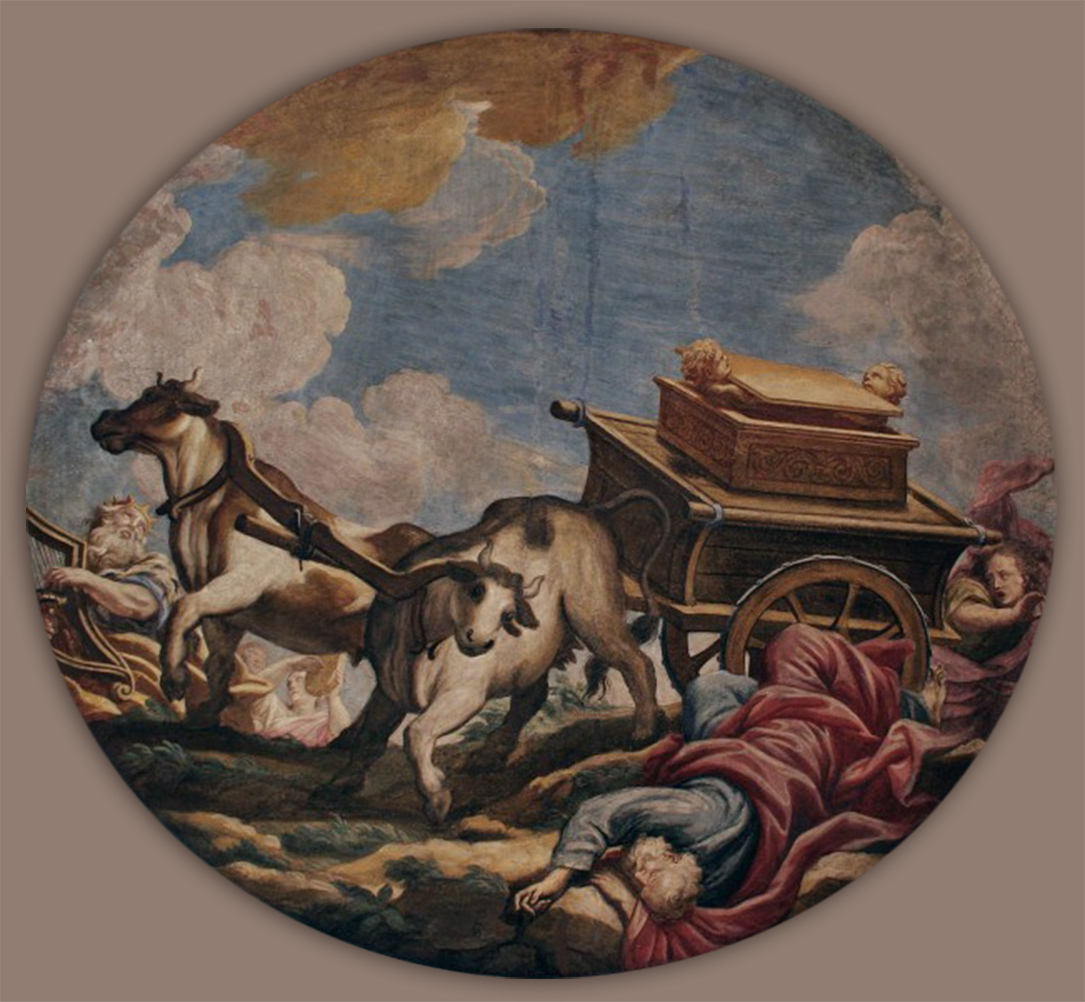
Baroque painting of the death of Uzzah by Giulio Quaglio the Younger in a medallion in Ljubljana Cathedral (1704)

Uzzah (also spelled Uzza from hebr.: עזה, meaning "Her Strength"), was an Israelite whose death is associated with touching the Ark of the Covenant. The account of Uzzah appears in 2 Samuel 6:3–8 and 1 Chronicles 13:7–11.

Uzzah was the son of Abinadab, in whose house the men of Kirjath-Jearim placed the Ark when it was brought back from the land of the Philistines. With his brother Ahio, he drove the cart on which the Ark was placed when David sought to bring it up to Jerusalem. When the oxen stumbled at the threshing floor of Chidon, making the Ark tilt, Uzzah steadied the Ark with his hand, in direct violation of the divine law, and he was immediately killed by the Lord for his error. David, displeased because Yahweh had killed Uzzah, called the place where this occurred "Perez-uzzah", which means "to burst out against Uzzah".

David was afraid to bring the Ark any further, and placed it in the house of Obed-Edom (2 Samuel 6:2–11; 1 Chronicles 13:6–13) for three months. As the Lord blessed Obed-edom, David finally brought the Ark up into the city.

The story in the Book of Samuel has contrasts with how it is presented in Chronicles. In the first there is no explanation or warning, as Uzza is acting with good intentions and his death is ambiguous. The author in the second narrative reinterprets it through the post-exilic ritual laws, where it must be carried on the shoulders of Levites. The death of Uzza is similar to that of Nadav and Avihu in Leviticus 10, the two hundred and fifty community leaders who unlawfully offer incense and are consumed in Numbers 16, and the seventy men of Beth-shemesh who are struck down by God for looking at the Ark of the Covenant in 1 Samuel 6.

== Rabbanic Literature ==
Rabbis have long made various attempts to explain and palliate the death of Uzzah. By an argumentum a majore ad minus, proof is offered that if the Ark could bear those who bore it, so much more could it bear itself. By not perceiving this, and thinking that the Ark might be prevented from falling by stopping the oxen, Uzzah had brought death on himself.

R. Johanan thought that "'al ha-shal" implied that he died as a result of his act, while R. Eleazar drew from "shal" the inference stated that he died "by" the Ark; and as the latter belonged to eternity, Uzzah in like manner must be immortal (Sotah 35a; Yalk., I Sam. 142, ed. Wilna, 1898.).

== Other ==
- A different Uzzah was the son of Shimei and a Merarite.
