= Colorado Caieiras Futebol Clube =

Brazilian football club

Colorado Caieiras
- Full name: Colorado Caieiras Futebol Clube Ltda.
- Nickname(s): Fénix (Phoenix)
- Founded: 18 September 2019; 5 years ago
- Ground: Carlos Ferracini
- Capacity: 5,560
- President: José de Araújo Cândido
- Head Coach: Oliveira
- League: Campeonato Paulista Série A4
- 2024: Paulista Série A4, 2nd of 17 (promoted)
Home colours	Away colours

Colorado Caieiras Futebol Clube, commonly referred to as Colorado Caieiras, is a Brazilian professional football club based in Caieiras, São Paulo. They currently compete in the Campeonato Paulista Segunda Divisão, the fourth tier of the São Paulo state football league.
