= War in the Hebrew Bible =

War in the Hebrew Bible concerns any military engagement narrated or discussed in the Hebrew Bible, also known as the Tanakh or Old Testament of the Bible. Texts about war in the Hebrew Bible are part of the broader topic of The Bible and violence. They cover a wide range of topics from detailed battle reports including weapons and tactics used, numbers of combatants involved, and casualties experienced, to discussions of motives and justifications for war, the sacred and secular aspects of war (with divinely commanded wars known as Milkhemet Mitzvah), descriptions and considerations of what in the modern era would be considered war crimes, such as genocide and wartime sexual violence (see also Rape in the Hebrew Bible), and reflections on wars that have happened, or predictions, visions or imaginations of wars that are yet to come.

== Overview ==
In modern times, biblical scholars have questioned the historicity of the Bible, including military events narrated in it. They have noted some discrepancies and contradictions between various descriptions of wars and battles. For example, with the exception of the first verse, scholars have long recognised and studied the parallels between chapter 1 of Judges and chapters 13 to 19 in the preceding Book of Joshua. Both provide similar accounts of the purported conquest of Canaan by the ancient Israelites. Judges 1 and Joshua 15–19 present two accounts of a slow, gradual, and only partial conquest by individual Israelite tribes, marred by defeats, in stark contrast with the 10th and 11th chapters of the Book of Joshua, which portray a swift and complete victory of a united Israelite army under the command of Joshua.

In cases such as the War against the Midianites found in Numbers 31, the scholarly consensus is that the war did not take place, certainly not as narrated. Rather than describing what really happened in the past, the author(s) of Numbers 31 most likely wished to convey a certain theological message about who Yahweh, Moses, Eleazar and Phinehas were, and how powerful the Israelites would be if Yahweh was on their side.

Sometimes, the Hebrew Bible contains the only known sources of a battle, such as in the case of the Siege of Jerusalem (587 BC) (primarily the books of Jeremiah, Ezekiel, and 2 Kings). In other cases, there are extrabiblical sources that attest to a military event having happened, such as the Fall of Nineveh (612 BCE); it is not only the main topic of the books of Nahum and Jonah, but also described in the Persica of the Greek writer Ctesias, and the Babylonian "Fall of Nineveh" chronicle found on a clay tablet. There are also some wars involving the ancient Israelites/Jews that have not been recorded in the Hebrew Bible, but that have been attested in other biblical writings (as well as extrabiblical sources), such as the Maccabean Revolt in the Greek Deuterocanonical books of the Maccabees, or the Siege of Jerusalem (70 CE) that is referenced in the Greek New Testament. Sometimes archaeology can provide some additional evidence in favour or against a purported biblical battle having happened or not.

== War in the Pentateuch ==
Warfare represents a special category of biblical violence and is a topic the Bible addresses, directly and indirectly, in four ways: there are verses that support pacifism, and verses that support non-resistance; 4th century theologian Augustine found the basis of just war in the Bible, and preventive war which is sometimes called crusade has also been supported using Bible texts. Historian Susan Niditch says the range of war ideologies in ancient Near Eastern culture can be seen by understanding attitudes toward war in the Hebrew Bible. In the Hebrew Bible warfare includes the Amalekites, Canaanites, Moabites, and the record in Exodus, Deuteronomy, Joshua, and both books of Kings.

God commands the Israelites to conquer the Promised Land, placing city after city "under the ban". The Hebrew verb ḥāram (חֲרֵ֤ם) connotes complete annihilation (New Revised Standard Version is “utterly destroy”; Deut. 7:2). The noun which is derived from the verb (ḥērem) is sometimes translated as "the ban" and it denotes the separation, exclusion and dedication of persons or objects to God which may be specially set apart for destruction (Deuteronomy 7:26; Leviticus 27:28-29). Historian Susan Niditch says "the root h-r-m links together several biblical non-war and war usages of the term ... under the heading of sacrifice."

Over half the occurrences of the verb and noun for the root ḥ-r-m are concerned with the destruction of nations in war. C. L. Crouch compares the two kingdoms of Israel and Judah to Assyria, saying their similarities in cosmology and ideology gave them similar ethical outlooks on war. Both Crouch and Lauren Monroe, professor of Near Eastern studies at Cornell, agree this means the ḥerem type of total war was not strictly an Israelite practice but was a common approach to war for many Near Eastern people of the Bronze and Iron Ages. For example, the 9th century Mesha Stele says that King Mesha of Moab fought in the name of his god Chemosh and that he subjected his enemies to ḥerem.

The Hebrew scholar Baruch A. Levine notes that Deut.7:1-11 shows that Hebrew ideology has evolved since the writing of Exodus 33:5-16, with its addition of the ban (see Exodus 20:19,20). Levine concludes that this is one of several indications, including extra-biblical evidence, that ḥērem was a later addition to Hebrew thought. Levine says this indicates that Israel was still, as late as Deuteronomy, making ideological adjustments with regard to the importation of the foreign practice of ḥērem from its source in the surrounding Near Eastern nations."

The early usage of herem indicates that the Israelites were not allowed to touch, possess, or redeem these "devoted things". However, the later usage of the term, such as its usage in Numbers 18:14-17 and Deuteronomy 7, indicates that items and first-born children were supposed to be set aside as ḥērem so that they could be redeemed by the Priests.

=== Battle of Siddim ===
In Genesis 14:1–17, the Battle of the Vale of Siddim is narrated, also often called the War of Nine Kings or the Slaughter of Chedorlaomer. It occurs in the days of Abram and Lot. The Vale of Siddim was the battleground for the cities of the Jordan River plain revolting against Mesopotamian rule. In the Book of Genesis, during the days of Lot, the vale of Siddim was a river valley where the Battle of Siddim occurred between four Mesopotamian armies and five cities of the Jordan plain. According to the biblical account, before the destruction of Sodom and Gomorrah, the Elamite King Chedorlaomer had subdued the tribes and cities surrounding the Jordan River plain. After 13 years, four kings of the cities of the Jordan plain revolted against Chedorlaomer's rule. In response, Chedorlaomer and three other kings started a campaign against King Bera of Sodom and four other allied kings.

The Northern forces overwhelmed the Southern kings of the Jordan plain, driving some of them into the asphalt or tar pits that littered the valley. Those who escaped fled to the mountains, including the kings of Sodom and Gomorrah. These two cities were then spoiled of their goods and provisions and some of their citizens were captured. Among the captives was Abraham's nephew, Lot. Abraham, staying in Elonei Mamrei with Aner and Eshcol, immediately mounted a rescue operation, arming 318 of his trained servants, who went in pursuit of the enemy armies that were returning to their homelands. They caught up with them in the city of Dan, flanking the enemy on multiple sides during a night raid. The attack ran its course as far as Hobah, north of Damascus, where he defeated Chedorlaomer and his forces. Abram recovered all the goods and the captives (including Lot). After the battle, Melchizedek, king of Salem, brought out bread and wine and blessed Abraham, who gave him a tenth of the plunder as tithes. Then Bera, king of Sodom, came to Abraham and thanked him, requesting that he keep the plunder but return his people. Abraham declined, saying, "I swore I would never take anything from you, so you can never say 'I have made Abraham rich.'" What Abraham accepted from Bera instead was food for his 318 men and his Amorite neighbours.

Whether this event occurred in history has been disputed by scholars. According to Ronald Hendel, "The current consensus is that there is little or no historical memory of pre-Israelite events in Genesis."

=== Crossing the Red Sea ===
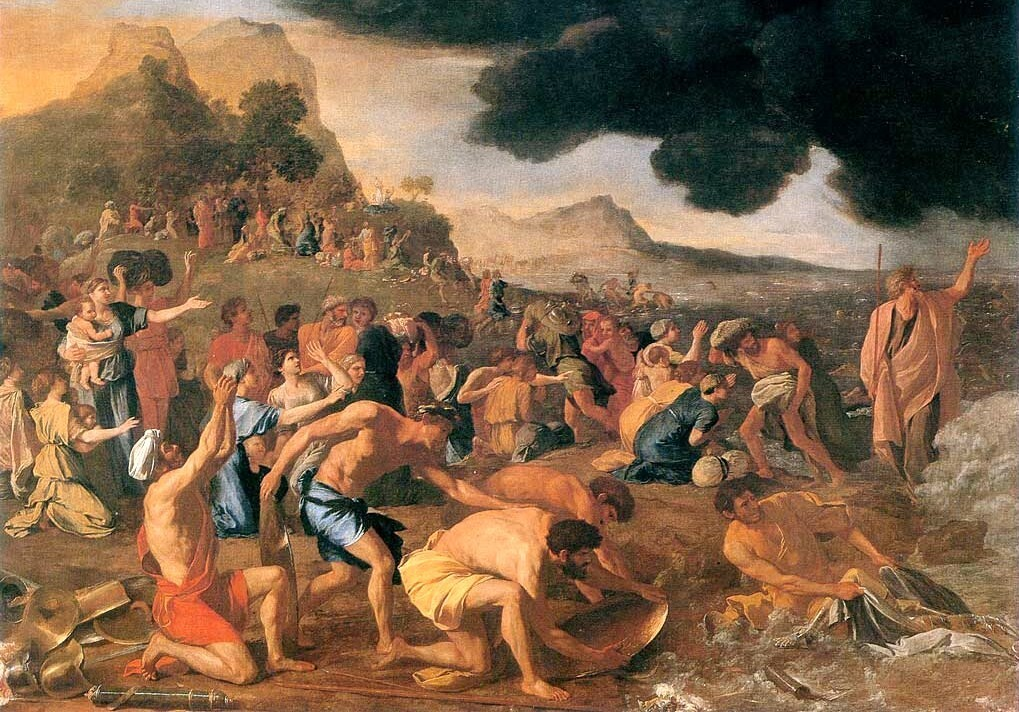
The Crossing of the Red Sea, by Nicolas Poussin (1633–34)

The Parting of the Red Sea or Crossing of the Red Sea (Hebrew: קריעת ים סוף, romanized: Kriat Yam Suph, lit. "parting of the sea of reeds") is an episode in The Exodus, a foundational story in the Hebrew Bible.

It tells of the escape of the Israelites, led by Moses, from the pursuing Egyptians, as recounted in the Book of Exodus. Moses holds out his staff and God parts the waters of the Yam Suph, which is traditionally presumed to be the Red Sea, although other interpretations have arisen. With the water dispersed, the Israelites were able to walk on dry ground and cross the sea, followed by the Egyptian army. Once the Israelites have safely crossed, Moses drops his staff, closing the sea, and drowning the pursuing Egyptians.

=== Battle of Refidim ===
The Battle of Refidim (or Rephidim), as described in Exodus 17:8–13, was a battle between the Israelites and the Amalekites, which occurred in Rephidim while the former were moving towards the Promised Land.

According to Exodus 17:8–13, following the Israelites' escape from Egypt they camped in Rephidim. The battle began with the Amalekites' unprovoked attack against the Israelites (Exodus 17:8). Afterwards, Yahweh announced the extermination of the Amalekites and called on Israel to defeat them, stating that Israel would experience peace with their enemies (Exodus 17:14, Deuteronomy 25:19). This was the first of several conflicts over several hundred years between the Amalekites and Israelites.

Moses urged the faithful to fight and placed his people under the leadership of Joshua. The words, "that will hold up the rod of God," could be an expression of his beliefs about impending victory in the coming battle, since they fought under the banner of God. Moses watched from above. When he held his hands up, Israel gained the military advantage. Whenever he put his hands down, according to the biblical account, they began to lose. The Bible describes how when Moses became tired, his closest relatives, Hur and Aaron, held up his hands for support (Exodus 17:12). The battle lasted until the evening, ending in victory for the Israelites.

The Book of Exodus mentions the curse-punishment thrown at enemies of the chosen people, the children of Israel. The Amalekites were to be erased from history. Curses with similar overtones are also recorded in the Book of Jeremiah (Jer 2:3). After the success of the Israeli military, it erected an altar – Yahweh-Nissi (Heb. יְהוָה נִסִּי) – denoting "The Lord is my banner." The name refers to the sticks held by Moses.

=== Golden calf massacre ===
In Exodus 32:26–28, it is narrated that Moses ordered the Levites to carry out a massacre amongst the Israelites as a punishment for making and worshipping the golden calf in his absence.

=== Conquest of Bashan ===
Numbers 21:33–35 and Deuteronomy 3:1–7 narrate that Moses and the Israelites conquer Bashan after destroying the entire army of king Og. Deuteronomy adds that they also exterminate the entire population, comprising 60 cities.

=== War against the Midianites ===
Numbers 31 is the 31st chapter of the Book of Numbers, the fourth book of the Pentateuch (Torah), the central part of the Hebrew Bible (Old Testament), a sacred text in Judaism and Christianity. Scholars such as Israel Knohl and Dennis T. Olson name this chapter the War against the Midianites.

Set in the southern Transjordanian regions of Moab and Midian, it narrates the Israelites waging war against the Midianites, commanded by Phinehas and Moses. They killed the men, including their five kings and Balaam, burnt their settlements and took captive the women, children and livestock. Moses commanded the Israelites to kill the boys, and women who had sex with men, and spare the virgin girls for themselves. The spoils of war were then divided between Eleazar, the Levitical priesthood, soldiers and Yahweh. (Note: Yahweh's name, written as 'YHWH' in the Hebrew Bible, is most typically printed as LORD in English-language bibles. See Names of God in Judaism and Names of God in Christianity.)

Much scholarly and religious controversy exists surrounding the authorship, meaning and ethics of this chapter of Numbers. It is closely connected to Numbers 25.

== War in the historical books ==
The historical books of the Hebrew Bible include Joshua, Judges, Ruth, Samuel (split in two in Christian Bibles: I Samuel and II Samuel), Kings (split in two in Christian Bibles: I Kings and II Kings), Chronicles (split in two in Christian Bibles: I Chronicles and II Chronicles), and Ezra (1 Esdras) and Nehemiah (2 Esdras) (sometimes jointly called Ezra–Nehemiah by scholars).

=== Conquest of Canaan ===
Narratives of the purported conquest of Canaan by the Israelites can be primarily found in Joshua chapters 2–19, and Judges 1. The Book of Joshua contains the most elaborate account. Judges 1 and Joshua 15–19 present two accounts of a slow, gradual, and only partial conquest by individual Israelite tribes, marred by defeats, in stark contrast with the 10th and 11th chapters of the Book of Joshua, which portray a swift and complete victory of a united Israelite army under the command of Joshua.

The narrative of the Israelites conquering the land of Canaan comprises verses 5:13 to 12:24 of the Book of Joshua and has the following outline:

A. Jericho (5:13–6:27)
B. Achan and Ai (7:1–8:29)
C. Renewal at Mount Ebal (8:30–35)
D. The Gibeonite Deception (9:1–27)
E. The Campaign in the South (10:1–43)

1. Victory over the Southern Alliance (10:1-15)

a. The Southern Alliance (10:1-5)
b. The Gibeonite Request (10:6-7)
c. Divine Reassurance (10:8)
d. Victory at Gibeon (10:9-11)
e. Affirmation of God's Unique Involvement (10:12-15)

2. Execution of the Five Kings of the Southern Alliance (10:16-27)

a. The Kings Held in the Cave (10:16-21)
b. The Kings Brought Out from the Cave (10:22-25)
c. The Kings Executed (10:26-27)

3. Victory over Southern Cities (10:28-39)

a. Makkedah (10:28)
b. Libnah (10:29-30)
c. Lachish (10:31-33)
d. Eglon (10:34-35)
e. Hebron (10:36-37)
f. Debir (10:38-39)

4. Summary of the Campaign in the South (10:40-43)

F. The Campaign in the North and Summary List of Kings (11:1–12:24)

1. Victory over the Northern Alliance (11:1-15)

a. The Northern Alliance (11:1-5)
b. Divine Reassurance (11:6)
c. Victory at Merom (11:7-9)
d. Destruction of Hazor (11:10–11)
e. Summation of Obedience and Victory (11:12–15)

2. Summaries of Taking the Land (11:16-12:24)

a. Taking the Land (11:16-20)
b. Extermination of the Anakim (11:21-22)
c. Narrative Pivot: Taking and Allotting (11:23)
d. Capture of Land and Kings (12:1-24)

i. East of the Jordan (12:1-6)
ii. West of the Jordan (12:7-24)

Chapters 10 and 11 closely parallel each other and have similar structure:

Joshua 10	Joshua 11
southern alliance (10:1–5)	northern alliance (11:1–5)
divine reassurance (10:8)	divine reassurance (11:6)
victory employing surprise (10:9–11)	victory employing surprise (11:7–9)
execution of kings/destruction of cities (10:16–39)	execution of kings/destruction of cities (11:10–15)
conquest summary (10:40–43)	conquest summary (11:16–23)

==== Battle of Jericho ====
Joshua 5:13–6:27 narrates the Battle of Jericho. Joshua, the leader of the Israelites, sent two spies to Jericho, the first city of Canaan that they decided to conquer, and discovered that the land was in fear of them and their God. According to Joshua 6:1–27, the Israelites marched around the walls once every day for six days with the priests carrying the Ark of the Covenant. On the seventh day they marched seven times around the walls, then the priests blew their ram's horns, the Israelites raised a great shout, and the walls of the city fell. Following God's law they killed every man and woman of every age, as well as the oxen, sheep, and donkeys. Only Rahab, a Canaanite prostitute who had sheltered the spies, her parents, brothers and all "those who belonged to her" were spared. Joshua then cursed anybody who rebuilt the foundations and gates, with the deaths of their firstborn and youngest child respectively. This was eventually fulfilled by Hiel the Bethelite under King Ahab's reign.

The Battle is described as the first battle fought by the Israelites in the course of the conquest of Canaan. Excavations at Tell es-Sultan, the biblical Jericho, have failed to substantiate this story, which has its origins in the nationalist propaganda of much later kings of Judah and their claims to the territory of the Kingdom of Israel. The lack of archaeological evidence and the composition, history and theological purposes of the Book of Joshua have led archaeologists like William G. Dever to characterise the story of the fall of Jericho as "invented out of whole cloth".

Judges 1 does not mention Jericho, although some Bible translations identify the "City of Palms" mentioned in Judges 1:16 with Jericho. Even so, the verse does not indicate the city was taken by military force, nor is it the first city the Israelites conquered according to Judges 1, which starts with the defeat of king Adoni-Bezek of the unidentified place "Bezek" (Judges 1:4–7), after which Jerusalem was supposedly taken and sacked (Judges 1:8).

==== Battle of Ai ====
In Joshua chapters 7 and 8, the Israelites attempt to conquer Ai on two occasions. The first, in Joshua 7, fails. The biblical account portrays the failure as being due to a prior sin of Achan, for which he is stoned to death by the Israelites. On the second attempt, in Joshua 8, Joshua, who is identified by the narrative as the leader of the Israelites, receives instruction from God. God tells them to set up an ambush and Joshua does what God says. An ambush is arranged at the rear of the city on the western side. Joshua is with a group of soldiers that approach the city from the front so the men of Ai, thinking they will have another easy victory, chase Joshua and the fighting men from the entrance of the city to lead the men of Ai away from the city. Then the fighting men to the rear enter the city and set it on fire. When the city is captured, 12,000 men and women are killed, and it is razed to the ground. The king is captured and hanged on a tree until the evening. His body is then placed at the city gates and stones are placed on top of his body. The Israelites then burn Ai completely and "made it a permanent heap of ruins". God told them they could take the livestock as plunder and they did so.

==== Battle of the Waters of Merom ====
According to Joshua 11, the Battle of the Waters of Merom was a battle between the Israelites and a coalition of Canaanite city-states near the Waters of Merom. Archaeologist Nadav Na'aman has suggested that this battle may never have taken place, and that its narrative might have "preserved some remote echoes of wars conducted in these places in early Iron Age I."

In the biblical narrative, around 40 years before the battle, the Israelites escaped from slavery in Egypt, setting out for the Exodus under the leadership of Moses. They entered Canaan near Jericho and captured several cities. An alliance of northern Canaanite city-states sent a united force to halt the Israelite invasion. The Israelites counterattacked, catching the Canaanite forces unaware and routing them with a fearsome head-on assault.

=== Period of judges ===
==== Battle of Mount Tabor ====
The Battle of Mount Tabor is described in the Book of Judges chapters 4 and 5 as taking place during the time of the Judges between the forces of King Jabin of Canaan who ruled from Hazor, and the Israelite army led by Barak and Deborah. It supposedly happened 160 years after Joshua's death.

The Israelites had been oppressed for twenty years by the Canaanite king Jabin, and by the captain of his army, Sisera, who commanded a force of nine hundred iron chariots. At this time, the prophetess Deborah was judging Israel. She summoned the general Barak, telling him that God commanded him to march on Mount Tabor with an Israelite army and God promised him he would "deliver them" (the Canaanites) into Barak's "power". Barak was hesitant and told Deborah that he would not undertake the campaign unless she accompanied him. The prophetess agreed to come, but scolded Barak, telling him that "you shall not gain the glory in the expedition on which you are setting out, for the Lord will have Sisera fall into the power of a woman." Deborah, Barak and the army gathered at Kedesh, its number rising to 10,000 warriors recruited from the tribes of Naphtali and Zebulun.

The Israelites marched to Mount Tabor. Their movements were reported to Sisera, who hastened to the Wadi Kishon, near Mount Tabor. God caused a strong rainstorm which saturated the ground, causing the Canaanites heavy iron chariots to become stuck in the mud. Rain filled the streams on the mountain causing a flash flood at the Wadi Kishon, sweeping many away. The Canaanites panicked and fled, and the Israelites pursued them and slayed them to the last man. Sisera left his chariot and ran for his life. Sisera reached to the tent of Yael, wife of Heber the Kenite, and she offered him shelter, as the Kenites were not at war with the Canaanites. Yael hid Sisera and gave him some milk to drink, but killed him after he fell asleep by knocking a tent peg through his temple. Thus, when Barak arrived in pursuit of Sisera, he found that Deborah's prophecy had been fulfilled.

==== Gideon's campaign ====
Gideon's battles against the Midianites are narrated in Judges 6 to 8. Following a period of 40 years of peace established by Deborah and Barak (Judges 5:31), according to Judges 6:1, 'The Israelites did evil in the eyes of Yahweh, and for seven years he gave them into the hands of the Midianites.' When the oppression of the Midianites becomes too severe to bear, the Israelites cry out to Yahweh for help (Judges 6:5), and Yahweh appoints Gideon as his champion, giving him supernatural powers to kill all the Midianites (Judges 6:16). There is some distrust between Yahweh and Gideon at first: Yahweh accuses the Israelites (and Gideon as one of them) for not listening to his command to 'not worship the gods of the Amorites', despite having brought the Israelites out of Egypt and driven out their 'oppressors' and giving them 'their land' (Canaan) (Judges 6:6–10). In return, Gideon accuses Yahweh of having abandoned the Israelites to the oppression of the Midianites despite having brought the Israelites (Gideon's ancestors) out of Egypt (Judges 6:11–13). It is not clear why Yahweh chooses to re-embrace the Israelites and trust Gideon as their champion, but Gideon's trust in Yahweh is restored when the god tells him to sacrifice a goat and unleavened bread, which an angel of Yahweh sets on fire (Judges 6:17–24). Gideon proceeds to follow Yahweh's orders to destroy the sanctuaries of other gods, including Baal and Asherah. This action is widely considered sacrilege by their devotees (Judges 6:14–32), and eventually causes 'all the Midianites, Amalekites and other eastern peoples' to join forces and attack, against which Gideon assembles a coalition of the Israelite tribes of Abiezrites, Manasseh, Asher, Zebulun and Naphtali (Judges 6:33–35).

==== Benjamite War ====
The episode of the Levite's concubine, also known as the Benjamite War, is presented in Judges 19–21 (chapters 19, 20 and 21 of the Book of Judges).

A Levite from Ephraim and his concubine travel through the Benjamite city of Gibeah and are assailed by a mob, who wish to gang-rape the Levite. He turns his concubine over to the crowd, and they rape her until she collapses. The Levite dismembers her and presents the remains to the other tribes of Israel. Outraged, the confederated tribes mobilized to demand justice and gathered a combined force of about 400,000 confederated Israelites at Mizpah. They sent men through all the tribe of Benjamin, demanding that they deliver up the men who committed the crime to be executed, but the Benjaminites refused and decided to go to war to defend the men of Gibeah instead. They gathered a rebel Benjaminite force of 26,000 to defend Gibeah. According to Judges 20:15–18, the strength of the armies numbered 26,000 men on the Benjamin side (of whom only 700 from Gibeah), and 400,000 men on the other side. According to Judges 20:16, among all these soldiers there were seven hundred select troops who were left-handed, each of whom could sling a stone at a hair and not miss. When the Tribe of Benjamin refused to surrender the guilty parties, the rest of the tribes marched on Gibeah. On the first day of battle the confederated Israelite tribes suffered heavy losses. On the second day Benjamin went out against them from Gibeah and cut down thousands of the confederated Israelite swordsmen. Then the confederated Israelites went up to the house of God. They sat there before the Lord and fasted that day until evening; and they offered burnt offerings and peace offerings before the Lord. (The ark of the covenant of God was there in those days, and Phinehas the son of Eleazar, the son of Aaron, stood before it.) And the Lord said, "Go up, for tomorrow I will deliver them into your hand."

On the third day the confederated Israelites set men in ambush all around Gibeah. They formed into formation as before and the rebelling Benjaminites went out to meet them. The rebelling Benjaminites killed about thirty in the highways and in the field, anticipating another victory where unaware of the trap that had been set as the confederated Israelites appeared to retreat and the Benjaminites were drawn away from the city to the highways in pursuit, one of which goes up to Bethel and the other to Gibeah. Those besieging the city sent up a great cloud of smoke as a signal, and the Israelite main force wheeled around to attack. When the Benjaminites saw their city in flames, and that the retreat had been a ruse, they panicked and routed toward the desert, pursued by the confederated Israelites. About 600 survived the onslaught and made for the more defensible rock of Rimmon where they remained for four months. The Israelites withdrew through the territory off Benjamin, destroying every city they came to, killing every inhabitant and all the livestock.

According to scholars, the biblical text describing the battle and the events surrounding it is considerably late in date, originating close to the time of the Deuteronomist's compilation of Judges from its source material, and clearly has several exaggerations of both numbers and modes of warfare. Additionally, the inhospitality which triggered the battle is reminiscent of the Torah's account of Sodom and Gomorrah. Many biblical scholars concluded that the account was a piece of political spin, which had been intended to disguise atrocities carried out by the tribe of Judah against Benjamin, probably in the time of King David as an act of revenge or spite by David against the associates of King Saul, by casting them further back in time, and adding a more justifiable motive. More recently, scholars have suggested that it is more likely for the narrative to be based on a kernel of truth, particularly since it accounts for the stark contrast in the biblical narrative between the character of the tribe before the incident and its character afterwards.

The confederated tribes had vowed that none would give his daughter to the Benjamites (or Benjaminites) for marriage, but after killing all but 600 Benjamites, the tribes were overcome by remorse, fearing that it would cause the extinction of an entire tribe. They circumvented the oath by pillaging and massacring the city of Jabesh-Gilead, none of whose residents partook in the war or in the vow, thereby capturing its 400 maidens for the Benjaminites. The 200 men still lacking women were subtly allowed to abduct the maidens dancing at Shiloh. Ken Steven Brown (2015) drew comparisons between Judges 21 and Numbers 31, stating: "This command [in Numbers 31:17–18] to kill all but the virgin girls is without precedent in the Pentateuch. However, [Judges 21] precisely parallels Moses's command. (...) Like Num 25, the story recounted in Judges 19–21 centers on the danger of apostasy, but its tale of civil war and escalating violence also emphasizes the tragedy that can result from the indiscriminate application of חרם [herem, meaning 'devotion to Yahweh, usually for complete destruction']. The whole account is highly ironic: the Israelites set out to avenge the rape of one woman, only to authorize the rapes of six hundred more. They regret the results of one slaughter, so they commit another to repair it".

==== Battle of Aphek ====
During this battle, described in the First Book of Samuel 4:1–10 of the Hebrew Bible, the Philistines defeated the Israelite army and captured the Ark of the Covenant. Among biblical scholars, the historicity of the early events in the Books of Samuel is debated, with some scholars leaning toward many events in Samuel being historical, and some scholars leaning towards less. (See also Biblical minimalism and Biblical maximalism.)

The Book of Samuel records that the Philistines were camped at Aphek and the Israelites at Eben-Ezer. The Philistines defeated the Israelites during the first battle, killing 4,000 Israelites. The Israelites then brought up the Ark of the Covenant from Shiloh, thinking that through this "they should have the presence of God with them, and so success", but the Philistines again defeated the Israelites, this time killing 30,000 and capturing the Ark. Samuel records that the two sons of the judge Eli, Hophni and Phinehas, died that day, as well as Eli. "And it came to pass, when [a messenger] made mention of the ark of God, that [Eli] fell from off his seat backward by the side of the gate, and his neck broke, and he died; for he was an old man, and heavy. And he had judged Israel forty years". (1 Samuel 4:18)

==== Battle of Mizpah ====
In the Book of Samuel, the Battle of Mizpah (1084 B.C.) was a battle in Israel that occurred when the Ark of the Covenant was captured in the Battle of Aphek.

=== United monarchy period ===
The united monarchy period in the Hebrew Bible stretches from the establishment of a supposed Kingdom of Israel (united monarchy) under Saul, David, and Solomon, until it split into the northern Kingdom of Israel (Samaria) and the southern Kingdom of Judah (Jerusalem) during the rule of Rehoboam (c. 930 BCE).

==== Battle of Michmash ====
The biblical Battle of Michmash (alternate spelling, Michmas) was fought between Israelites under Jonathan, son of King Saul and a force of Philistines at Michmash, a town east of Bethel and south of Migron. According to the Bible, Saul's army consisted entirely of infantry, about 3,000 soldiers and militia men. Saul kept a standing army of three thousand soldiers after the Battle of Jabesh-Gilead. However, none of the soldiers carried swords or spears with them and had to rely on axes, sickles, mattocks, and plow points as weapons. According to 1 Samuel 13:21, "the price was 2/3 of a shekel for sharpening plow points and mattocks, and 1/3 of a shekel for sharpening forks and axes." Only King Saul and his son Jonathan were said to have carried a spear and a bronze straight sword between them, though it is also possible that Jonathan was armed with a bow and quiver of arrows as well.

The full strength of the Philistine armies at Michmash has been debated. According to Josephus and some versions of the Bible, the Philistines dispatched a force of 30,000 chariots, 6,000 horsemen, and a large number of infantry against King Saul's army, but it is believed that the Philistines supplied way fewer than 30,000 chariots to the battlefield. The actual size and strength of the Philistine army is estimated at over 40,000 men, consisting of 6,000 horsemen and about 3,000 special hamashhith units. Each hamashhith was composed of a chariot carrying 2 men, a charioteer and an archer with javelins, bows, and arrows, and three squads of infantry runners, 4-men each. The infantry runners, also wearing leather breastplates and armed with swords, spears, and round bronze shields, would have numbered more than 30,000 men in total strength. Add in the charioteers and archers mounted in the chariots and the 6,000 horsemen, the Philistines mustered a total of 48,000 soldiers against the Israelites.

As described in 1 Samuel 13, "Saul, and Jonathan his son, and the people that were present with them, abode in Gibeah of Benjamin, but the Philistines encamped in Michmash." Jonathan is recalled to have found a secret path around the Philistines, allowing him to flank them and defeat them. Jonathan silently approached the Philistine garrison with his armour-bearer, not telling his father of the act, and passed two rocky crags: "there was a sharp rock on the one side, and a sharp rock on the other side: and the name of the one was Bozez and the name of the other Seneh." The two single-handedly climbed the ramparts and attacked the garrison "within as it were an half acre of land, which a yoke of oxen might plough." They are said to have killed twenty men together in that single ambush. The remainder of the camp awoke with confusion, and "melted away and they went on beating down one another." During the confusion and chaos, a detachment of Israelite warriors had previously been fighting alongside the Philistines defected over to the army of King Saul, bringing the king's force from six hundred men to several thousand strong. Finally, a miraculous earthquake threw the entire Philistine host into disarray. Drawn by the sounds of combat, Saul approached the garrison with his own force only to find that the army had already torn itself apart in fear, with the majority of survivors fleeing from Saul's army. No account in the Bible tells us how many Philistines fell in the battle, though Josephus numbers the Philistine casualties to as many as 60,000.

==== Pool of Gibeon ====
The Pool of Gibeon is mentioned a number of times in the Hebrew Bible. Archeological evidence locates the historical site of the pool in the village of Jib, in Samaria. In the Second Book of Samuel, twelve men commanded by Abner fought twelve men commanded by Joab at the pool.

Abner the son of Ner, and the servants of Ish-bo'sheth the son of Saul, went out from Mahana'im to Gibeon. And Jo'ab the son of Zeru'iah, and the servants of David, went out and met them at the pool of Gibeon; and they sat down, the one on the one side of the pool, and the other on the other side of the pool. And Abner said to Jo'ab, "Let the young men arise and play before us." And Jo'ab said, "Let them arise." Then they arose and passed over by number, twelve for Benjamin and Ish-bo'sheth the son of Saul, and twelve of the servants of David. And each caught his opponent by the head, and thrust his sword in his opponent's side; so they fell down together. Therefore that place was called Hel'kath-hazzu'rim, which is at Gibeon. And the battle was very fierce that day; and Abner and the men of Israel were beaten before the servants of David. (2 Samuel 2:12–17)

The remains of Gibeon were excavated in the late 1950s and early 1960s by a team of archeologists led by University of Pennsylvania archaeologist James B. Pritchard. The pool itself was unearthed in 1957. The Pool of Gibeon, "one of the ancient world's remarkable engineering achievements", was dug 88 feet into limestone until it met the water table. A spiral staircase along the walls allowed access to the water, according to the archeologists that excavated the site.

==== Siege of Jebus ====
The Siege of Jebus is described in passages of the Hebrew Bible as having occurred when the Israelites, led by king David, besieged and conquered the Canaanite city of Jerusalem, then known as Jebus (Hebrew: יבוס, Yəḇūs, transl. 'threshing-floor'). The Israelites gained access to the city by conducting a surprise assault, and Jebus (or Jerusalem) was subsequently installed as the capital city of the United Kingdom of Israel under its initial name as the City of David.

The identification of Jebus with Jerusalem has been challenged. Danish biblical scholar Niels Peter Lemche notes that every non-biblical mention of Jerusalem found in the ancient Near East refers to the city with the name of Jerusalem, offering as an example the Amarna letters, which are dated to the 14th century BCE and refer to Jerusalem as Urasalimmu. He states that "There is no evidence of Jebus and the Jebusites outside of the Old Testament. Some scholars reckon Jebus to be a different place from Jerusalem; other scholars prefer to see the name of Jebus as a kind of pseudo-ethnic name without any historical background".

The capture of Jebus is mentioned in 2 Samuel 5 and 1 Chronicles 11 with similar wordings:

And David and all Israel went to Jerusalem, that is, Jebus, where the Jebusites were, the inhabitants of the land. The inhabitants of Jebus said to David, "You will not come in here." Nevertheless, David took the stronghold of Zion, that is, the city of David.

— 1 Chronicles 11:4–5

==== Battle of the Wood of Ephraim ====
According to 2 Samuel, the Battle of the Wood of Ephraim occurred between the rebel forces of the formerly exiled Israelite prince Absalom against the royal forces of his father King David during a short-lived revolt.

Absalom, the third son of King David of Israel, had been newly returned from three years in exile in Geshur for the murder of his half-brother, Amnon and received a pardon with some restrictions. Later, he began a campaign to win the lost favour and trust of the people, which was successful. Absalom, under the pretense of going to worship at Hebron, asked King David permission to leave Jerusalem. David, unaware of his true intentions, granted it and Absalom left with an escort of 200 men. Upon arriving in the city, Absalom sent messengers to all the leaders and tribal princes throughout the empire to back him as king. Meanwhile, back in Hebron he continued to sacrifice under the guise that he was only there to worship God while still gathering officials and important people in the empire, growing his numbers and strength, including receiving the support of Ahithophel of Giloh one of the royal councilors. When News of Absalom's now open revolt in Hebron reached the royal Israelite court in Jerusalem Upon learning of these developments, King David ordered the city and court evacuated, fearing that the rebel forces under Absalom would besiege. He left with the entire Israelite royal house, as well as his elite Cherethite/Pelethite Royal guard, a mercenary force of 600 Gathites under their commander Ittai the Gittite. They marched to the Kidron valley and came to the bank of the Jordan river. They crossed leaving behind several spies and double agents to subvert Absalom and his conspirators and infiltrate their court and gather information on the rebel movements. David retreated to a city east of the Jordan, Mahanaim, most likely to be identified with Tell adh-Dhahab ash-Sharqiyya on the south side of the Jabbok River. Most Bible geographers place the "Forest of Ephraim" east of the Jordan River, in the region also known as Gilead. This identification is bolstered by the statement that Absalom's army camped "in the land of Gilead" as they prepared for battle against David.

Absalom initiated the attack with his forces. He chose Amasa, one of Joab's kinsmen, as general, and marched out of Jerusalem into the land of Gilead. When David entered Mahanaim with his forces, as a result of his fame many warriors flocked to his aid, and passed before him to the battle, as he stood at the gate of the city. David divided the army into three parts—one was to be led by Joab; one by Abishai; and the third by Ittai, the trusted friend and commander from Gath. David then declared that he would head the army himself, but his soldiers would not allow David to risk his life. They asked him to remain in the city. When all was ready, David gave to the three Generals this parting injunction, "Deal gently, for my sake, with the young man, with Absalom." The two armies met in a forest of Ephraim. It was a great and terrible battle. The rebel forces were unable to maneuver because the thickness of trees, and their numbers were reduced by the underbrush of the forest. The forces of Absalom were thus routed by the royal forces of David. Absalom himself fled. As he was riding through the woods on his mule, he was caught by the long locks of his hair under the spreading branches of a large tree. Unable to free himself, he remained suspended, his mule had escaped. One of David's servants brought this intelligence to General Joab, who gave the order that Absalom be put to death and the royal troops disengaged immediately thereafter.

Scholarly opinion is divided as to the historicity of the events in the Books of Samuel. Most scholars believe that the Books of Samuel contain a large amount of historical information, while there are some dissenters who view them as entirely fictional.

==== Battles of Baal-perazim and the Valley of Rephaim ====
According to 2 Samuel 5:20, and 1 Chronicles 14:11, Ba'al-Perazim was the scene of a victory gained by David over the Philistines. It may be the same as a Mount Perazim referenced in Isaiah 28:21. which suggests a mountain with a high ground position for David to attack. Alternatively, since David says "Yahweh burst-through" (פָּרַץ יְהוָה) "like bursting of waters" (פֶרֶץ מָיִם) it may be a reference to waters.

=== Israel and Judah period ===
The Israel and Judah period in the Hebrew Bible stretches from the alleged split of the united monarchy into Israel and Judah (c. 930 BCE), until the fall of Judah due to the Babylonian conquest of Jerusalem in 587 BCE. The military and religious conflict between the Kingdom of Israel and Kingdom of Judah is claimed to have originated with the rejection of idolatrous practices introduced by King Solomon. This is alleged to have led to different religious traditions in the north and south. The Judahite prophet Isaiah, active in Jerusalem about a century before Josiah, makes no mention of the Exodus, covenants with God, or disobedience to God's laws; in contrast Isaiah's contemporary Hosea, active in the northern kingdom of Israel, makes frequent reference to the Exodus, the wilderness wanderings, a covenant, the danger of foreign gods and the need to worship Yahweh alone; this has led scholars to the view that these traditions behind Deuteronomy have a northern origin. Whether the Deuteronomic code – the set of laws at chapters 12–26 which form the original core of the book – was written in Josiah's time (late 7th century) or earlier is subject to debate, but many of the individual laws are older than the collection itself. The two poems at chapters 32–33 – the Song of Moses and the Blessing of Moses were probably originally independent.

==== Jeroboam's Revolt ====
Jeroboam's Revolt (Hebrew: יִפְשְׁעוּ יִשְׂרָאֵל בְּבֵית דָּוִד, Modern: Yīfš'ū Yīsraʾēl B'vēt Davīd, Tiberian: Yīp̄š'ū Yīsrāʾēl Bəḇēṯ Dāwīḏ, 'Israel's revolt against the House of David') was an armed insurrection against Rehoboam, king of the United Monarchy of Israel, and subsequently the Kingdom of Judah, led by Jeroboam in the late 10th century BCE, according to the First Book of Kings and the Second Book of Chronicles of the Hebrew Bible. The conflict, referring to the independence of the Kingdom of Samaria and the subsequent civil war during Jeroboam's rule, began shortly after the death of Solomon and lasted until the Battle of Mount Zemaraim. The conflict began due to discontent under the rule of Solomon's successor, his son Rehoboam, and was waged with the goal of breaking away from the United Monarchy of Israel. Though this goal was achieved very early on in the conflict, the war continued throughout the duration of Rehoboam's reign and well into the reign of his son, Abijam, who defeated the armies of Jeroboam but failed to reunite the kingdoms.

Jeroboam had fled to Egypt decades prior to the war after Solomon tried to kill him following prophecies by Yahweh (1 Kings 11:9-13) and Ahijah (1 Kings 11:29-39) that God wanted Jeroboam to rule over ten of the twelve Tribes of Israel, and lived under the protection of the pharaoh Shishak, probably Shoshenq I. Following the news of Solomon's death in 931 BCE, Jeroboam ventured back to the kingdoms of Israel, now under the rule of Solomon's son Rehoboam. Rehoboam's rule had been comparatively less appreciated than his father's, having been advised to show no weakness to the people, and to tax them even more. Jeroboam, as part of a delegation, went before Rehoboam and petitioned for a cap on taxes, which Rehoboam refused. Following the rejection, ten of the tribes withdrew their allegiance to the house of David and proclaimed Jeroboam their king, forming Samaria. Only the tribes of Judah and Benjamin remained loyal to Rehoboam in the new kingdom of Judah.

The Battle of Mount Zemaraim in c. 913 BCE proved to be Jeroboam's final defeat, as the armies of Rehoboam's son Abijam reportedly killed half a million of Jeroboam's soldiers and captured the important Samarian centers of Bethel, Jeshanah, and Ephron, with their surrounding villages. Following this defeat, Jeroboam posed little threat to the Davidic kingdom, and died three years later. Despite defeating the separatist forces of the ten rebel tribes, the kingdoms of Judah and Samaria failed to be reunified in the wake of the war's end, and remained increasingly divided until being destroyed by invaders in 586 BCE and 720 BCE respectively.

===== Battle of Mount Zemaraim =====
The great Battle of Mount Zemaraim was reported in the Bible to have been fought in Mount Zemaraim, when the army of the Kingdom of Israel led by the king Jeroboam I encountered the army of the Kingdom of Judah led by the king Abijah I. About 500,000 Israelites were said to have lain dead after this single engagement, though most modern commentators consider the numbers to be either wildly exaggerated or symbolic, and some have even questioned its fundamental historicity. A chronology proposed by Edwin Thiele suggests the battle would have taken place in around 913 BC.

The friction began when the late king Rehoboam increased the royal taxes throughout the Kingdom of Israel after Solomon died in about 931 BCE. This created discontent among all the Israelite tribes of the kingdom, excepting Judah and Benjamin, and the people's discontent soon became a rebellion when the king, against the advice of the elders, refused to lessen the burdens of royal taxation. The ten northern tribes of Israel eventually broke up from the kingdom and made a new Kingdom of Israel with the former fugitive and exile Jeroboam as king, provoking a civil war. Rehoboam then went to war against the new kingdom with a force of 180,000 soldiers, but was advised against fighting his brethren, so he returned to Jerusalem. After the unified kingdom was divided, there had been constant border issues between the two parties, and both attempted to settle them. Abijah succeeded to the throne after the death of his father Rehoboam, and attempted to reunite all of Israel, including Judah, under his rule. According to biblical sources, Abijah had an army of 400,000, all of them handpicked or conscripted, and Jeroboam had 800,000 warriors.

Before the battle, Abijah addressed the armies of Israel, urging them to submit and to let the Kingdom of Israel be whole again. As written in the biblical narrative (2 Chronicles 13:4-12), Abijah then rallied his own troops with an address to all the people of Israel:

“Listen to me, Jeroboam and all Israel: 5 “Do you not know that the LORD God of Israel gave the rule over Israel forever to David and his sons by a covenant of salt? 6 “Yet Jeroboam the son of Nebat, the servant of Solomon the son of David, rose up and rebelled against his master, 7 and worthless men gathered about him, scoundrels, who proved too strong for Rehoboam, the son of Solomon, when he was young and timid and could not hold his own against them. 8 “So now you intend to resist the kingdom of the LORD through the sons of David, being a great multitude and having with you the golden calves which Jeroboam made for gods for you. 9 “Have you not driven out the priests of the LORD, the sons of Aaron and the Levites, and made for yourselves priests like the peoples of other lands? Whoever comes to consecrate himself with a young bull and seven rams, even he may become a priest of what are no gods. 10 “But as for us, the LORD is our God, and we have not forsaken Him; and the sons of Aaron are ministering to the LORD as priests, and the Levites attend to their work. 11 “Every morning and evening they burn to the LORD burnt offerings and fragrant incense, and the showbread is set on the clean table, and the golden lampstand with its lamps is ready to light every evening; for we keep the charge of the LORD our God, but you have forsaken Him. 12 “Now behold, God is with us at our head and His priests with the signal trumpets to sound the alarm against you. O sons of Israel, do not fight against the LORD God of your fathers, for you will not succeed.”

Abijah's plea to Jeroboam was not heeded. Jeroboam had set up an ambush to come from the rear of Abijah's army, so that the latter's army would be fighting on his army's front and rear, executing a giant pincer movement. All of the soldiers of Judah pleaded to God for help, and then the priests blew the trumpets. Abijah was quick in countering this move made by Jeroboam; he ordered his warriors to fight bravely and countered the pincer movement executed by Jeroboam to his warriors, crushing the latter's huge army. Abijah and the warriors of Judah who were under his command had won the day, killing 500,000 Israelite warriors in the process. The rest of the Israelite army fled from the battlefield heading back north, and the forces of Judah then staged a relentless pursuit against them, taking the cities of Bethel, Jeshanah and Ephron during the ensuing pursuit. The factor for Judah's success in the battle is mainly attributed to Abijah and his troops' devotion to their God.

Jeroboam was crippled by this severe defeat to Abijah and thus posed little threat to the Kingdom of Judah for the rest of his reign; however, despite being victorious, Abijah also failed to reunify Israel and Judah. To conclude, despite the battle being decisive for both sides, this only deepened their division of each other, and these two kingdoms would be engaged in severe border wars for almost two centuries until the Kingdom of Israel's conquest and destruction by Assyria in 720 BC.

==== Shishak's sack of Jerusalem ====
According to 1 Kings 14:25 and 2 Chronicles 12:1–12, there was an Egyptian pharaoh called Shishak (possibly the same person as Shoshenq I, r. ~943–922 BCE) who attacked and sacked Jerusalem in the fifth year of king Rehoboam's rule of Judah (usually dated to c. 926 BCE). Moreover, Egyptian sources such as the Bubastite Portal at Karnak confirm the accounts of Shoshenq I's campaign in Canaan, around the same time as Rehobeam; the size of the Egyptian army might not be unrealistic for the historical period, and a relief from Karnak records Sheshonq I presenting the tribute taken from his Levantine campaign to Amun-Re, later used to finance the construction of several structures across Egypt.

==== Battle of Zephath ====
The Old Testament describes this battle in 2 Chronicles 14:9–15 as having occurred during the dates of 911–870 BCE, in the reign of King Asa of Judah. It was fought at the Valley of Zephath near Maresha, in modern-day Israel, between the armies of the Kingdom of Judah under the command of King Asa and that of the Kushites and ancient Egyptians under the command of Zerah the Ethiopian who, given the time frame with Asa's reign, may have been a military commander under Pharaoh Osorkon I.

The warriors of Judah were victorious in the battle, utterly defeating the Egyptians and Kushites, which the Chronicler attributes to divine intervention, and Asa's forces collected a large volume of war spoils. Asa's forces pursued the enemy stragglers as far as the coastal city of Gerar, where they halted due to exhaustion. The result of the battle created peace between Judah and Egypt until the time of Josiah some centuries later, when the latter would again make encroachments in the region.

==== Tibni–Omri war ====
The Tibni–Omri war, briefly mentioned in 1 Kings 16, appears to have taken place from c. 886 to 883 BCE. Zimri assassinated king Elah of Samaria and all his family members, starting a war of succession between rival factions. One faction was led by Omri, commander of an Israelite army encamped near Gibbethon; his soldiers had acclaimed him as king upon hearing of Zimri's usurpation (1 Kings 16:15–16). Omri led his army towards the capital and commenced the siege of Tirzah (1 Kings 16:17). When Zimri realised the city would fall, he set his palace on fire and perished in the flames after a reign of seven days; the narrator claims this happened because he had 'sinned in the eyes of Yahweh', just like his predecessor Jeroboam (1 Kings 16:17–18). The people of Israel/Samaria were then divided into two factions, one siding with Omri, and the other with Tibni (1 Kings 16:21). As Zimri's 7-day reign began in Asa of Judah's 27th reign year and Omri's reign began in Asa's 31st (1 Kings 16:23), the war would have lasted about 4 years until Omri's forces prevailed. Tibni is recorded as having died, and the Septuagint adds that he had a brother called Joram (Ancient Greek: καὶ Ἰωρὰμ ὁ ἀδελφὸς αὐτοῦ) who died as well (1 Kings 16:22), although how they met their ends is not narrated.

==== Battle of Megiddo (609 BCE) ====
The biblical Battle of Megiddo is recorded as having taken place in 609 BC when Pharaoh Necho II of Egypt led his army to Carchemish (northern Syria) to join with his allies, the fading Neo-Assyrian Empire, against the surging Neo-Babylonian Empire. This required passing through territory controlled by the Kingdom of Judah. The Judaean king Josiah refused to let the Egyptians pass. The Judaean forces battled the Egyptians at Megiddo, resulting in Josiah's death and his kingdom becoming a vassal state of Egypt. The battle is recorded in the Hebrew Bible, the Greek 1 Esdras, and the writings of Josephus. While Necho II gained control of the Kingdom of Judah, the combined Assyrian-Egyptian forces lost to the Babylonians at the Fall of Harran, after which Assyria largely ceased to exist as an independent state.

The basic story is told in 2 Kings 23:29–30 (written c. 550 BC). The Hebrew text here has been misunderstood and translated as Necho going 'against' Assyria. Cline 2000:92-93 notes that most modern translations try to improve this passage by taking into account what we now know from other historical sources, namely that Egypt and Assyria were then allies. The original text also does not mention a 'battle', yet some modern versions add the word 'battle' to the text.

In his days Pharaoh Neco king of Egypt went up to the king of Assyria to the river Euphrates. King Josiah went to meet him; and Pharaoh Neco slew him at Megiddo, when he saw him. And his servants carried him dead in a chariot from Megiddo, and brought him to Jerusalem, and buried him in his own tomb.

There is a longer account recorded later in 2 Chronicles 35:20–25 (written c. 350–300 BC).

After all this, when Josiah had set the temple in order, Neco king of Egypt came up to make war at Carchemish on the Euphrates, and Josiah went out to engage him. But Neco sent messengers to him, saying, "What have we to do with each other, O King of Judah? I am not coming against you today but against the house with which I am at war, and God has ordered me to hurry. Stop for your own sake from interfering with God who is with me, so that He will not destroy you." However, Josiah would not turn away from him, but disguised himself in order to make war with him; nor did he listen to the words of Neco from the mouth of God, but came to make war on the plain of Megiddo. The archers shot King Josiah, and the king said to his servants, "Take me away, for I am badly wounded." So his servants took him out of the chariot and carried him in the second chariot which he had, and brought him to Jerusalem where he died and was buried in the tombs of his fathers.

== War in the prophetic books ==
The prophetic books of the Hebrew Bible contain the books of Isaiah through Malachi. Some of the battles mentioned or described in the prophetic books also feature in the historical books, and so there is some overlap in content, although the information provided may differ significantly.

=== Fall of Nineveh (612 BCE) ===
The Book of Nahum is dedicated to the Fall of Nineveh, which happened in or around 612 BCE. The story was supposedly written down after "the vision of Nahum the Elkoshite". Chapter 1 narrates in the first and third person how the Israelite deity Yahweh tells the Assyrians that he will punish them by destroying their capital city of Nineveh, and chapters 2 and 3 go on to narrate in detail how he will do so. Scholar Susanne Scholz (2021) noted that Nahum 3 mirrors other Hebrew prophetic poems in which a city (with Nineveh here being a pars pro toto representative of the Neo-Assyrian Empire) destroyed by a foreign enemy is portrayed as a sexually promiscuous woman who receives sexual violence and the resulting shame as a just punishment for her sins. Even though the Israelite god Yahweh had no previous relationship with Nineveh that the latter could be 'unfaithful' to, it is presented as revenge for the Assyrian conquest of the northern Kingdom of Israel (Samaria) and the Assyrian captivity in the 730s BCE.

=== Battle of Carchemish (605 BCE) ===
This battle was fought about 605 BC between the armies of Egypt allied with the remnants of the army of the former Assyrian Empire against the armies of Babylonia, allied with the Medes, Persians, and Scythians. This battle is mentioned in the Book of Ezekiel chapter 30, and in the Book of Jeremiah.

The Egyptians met the full might of the Babylonian and Median army led by Nebuchadnezzar II at Carchemish, where the combined Egyptian and Assyrian forces were destroyed. Assyria ceased to exist as an independent power, and Egypt retreated and was no longer a significant force in the Ancient Near East. Babylonia reached its economic peak after 605 BC.

=== Siege of Jerusalem (597 BCE) ===
To avoid the destruction of Jerusalem, King Jehoiakim of Judah, in his third year, changed his allegiance from Egypt to Babylon. He paid tribute from the treasury in Jerusalem, some temple artifacts and some of the royal family and nobility as hostages. In 601 BC, during the fourth year of his reign, Nebuchadnezzar unsuccessfully attempted to invade Egypt and was repulsed with heavy losses. The failure led to numerous rebellions among the states of the Levant which owed allegiance to Babylon, including Judah, where King Jehoiakim stopped paying tribute to Nebuchadnezzar and took a pro-Egyptian position.

Nebuchadnezzar soon dealt with these rebellions. According to the Nebuchadnezzar Chronicle, he laid siege to Jerusalem, which eventually fell in 597 BC. The Chronicle states:

In the seventh year [of Nebuchadnezzar, 598 BC] in the month Chislev [November/December] the king of Babylon assembled his army, and after he had invaded the land of Hatti (Syria/Palestine) he laid siege to the city of Judah. On the second day of the month of Adar [16 March] he conquered the city and took the king [Jeconiah] prisoner. He installed in his place a king [Zedekiah] of his own choice, and after he had received rich tribute, he sent forth to Babylon.

Jehoiakim died during the siege, possibly on December 10, 598 BC, or during the months of Kislev, or Tevet. Nebuchadnezzar pillaged the city and its Temple, and the new king Jeconiah, who was either 8 or 18, and his court and other prominent citizens and craftsmen, were deported to Babylon. The deportation occurred prior to Nisan of 597 BC, and dates in the Book of Ezekiel are counted from that event.

Nebuchadnezzar installed Jeconiah's uncle, Zedekiah as puppet-king of Judah, and Jeconiah was compelled to remain in Babylon. The start of Zedekiah's reign has been variously dated within a few weeks before, or after the start of Nisan 597 BC.

=== Siege of Jerusalem (587 BCE) ===
Nebuchadnezzar began a siege of Jerusalem in January 589 BC. Many Jews fled to surrounding Moab, Ammon, Edom and other countries to seek refuge. The Bible describes the city as enduring horrible deprivation during the siege (2 Kings 25:3; Lamentations 4:4, 5, 9). The city fell after a siege, which lasted either eighteen or thirty months. In the eleventh year of Zedekiah's reign (2 Kings 25:2; Jeremiah 39:2), Nebuchadnezzar broke through Jerusalem's walls, conquering the city. Zedekiah and his followers attempted to escape but were captured on the plains of Jericho and taken to Riblah. There, after seeing his sons killed, Zedekiah was blinded, bound, and taken captive to Babylon (2 Kings 25:1–7; 2 Chronicles 36:12; Jeremiah 32:4–5; 34:2–3; 39:1–7; 52:4–11), where he remained a prisoner until his death.

After the fall of Jerusalem, the Babylonian general Nebuzaraddan was sent to complete its destruction. Jerusalem was plundered, and Solomon's Temple was destroyed. Most of the elite were taken into captivity in Babylon. The city was razed to the ground. Only a few people were permitted to remain to tend to the land (Jeremiah 52:16). The Jew Gedaliah was made governor of the remnant of Judah, the Yehud Province, with a Chaldean guard stationed at Mizpah (2 Kings 25:22–24; Jeremiah 40:6–8). The Bible reports that, on hearing this news, Jews who had fled to Moab, Ammon, Edom, and in other countries returned to Judah (Jeremiah 40:11–12). Gedaliah was assassinated by Ishmael son of Nethaniah two months later, and the population that had remained and those who had returned then fled to Egypt for safety (2 Kings 25:25–26, Jeremiah 43:5–7). In Egypt, they settled in Migdol (it is uncertain where the Bible is referring to here, probably somewhere in the Nile Delta), Tahpanhes, Memphis (called Noph), and Pathros in the vicinity of Thebes (Jeremiah 44:1).

== List of Hebrew Bible battles ==
Name of conflict	Biblical sources	Extrabiblical sources	Notes	Dating	Historicity
Battle of Siddim	Genesis 14:1–17	Samaritan Pentateuch	Five Cities of Jordan Plain defeat Mesopotamian kingdoms at Siddim (near Dead Sea?)	Early 2nd millennium BCE	Historical
Crossing the Red Sea	Exodus 13:17–15:21	Samaritan Pentateuch	Yahweh parts Red Sea so Moses & Israelites cross, then drowns chasing Egyptians	(13th century BCE)	
Battle of Refidim	Exodus 17:8–13	Samaritan Pentateuch	Yahweh assists Moses & Israelites in defeating Amalekites at Rephidim	(13th century BCE)	Historical
Golden calf massacre	Exodus 32:26–28	Samaritan Pentateuch	Moses instructs Levites to kill Israelites as punishment for golden calf		Historical
Conquest of Heshbon	Numbers 21:21–30; Deuteronomy 2:24–34; Judges 11:19–22	Samaritan Pentateuch	Moses & Israelites kill all Heshbon soldiers (and civilians?)		Historical
Conquest of Bashan	Numbers 21:33–35; Deuteronomy 3:1–7	Samaritan Pentateuch	Moses & Israelites kill all Bashan soldiers (and civilians?)		Historical
War against the Midianites	Numbers 31	Samaritan Pentateuch	Yahweh assists Phinehas & Israelites in massacring Midianite men, enslaving virgins	(late 13th century BCE)	Historical
Conquest of Canaan	Joshua 2–19; Judges 1		Joshua 10–11: Joshua & Israelites swiftly completely conquer Canaan; Judges 1 (& Joshua 15–19): Israelite tribes slowly partially conquer Canaan		Historical
Battle of Jericho	Joshua 5:13–6:27		Yahweh assists Joshua & Israelites in destroying Jericho	(16th or 13th century BCE)	Historical
Battles of Ai	Joshua 7–8		Yahweh assists Joshua & Israelites in destroying Ai		Historical
Battle of the Waters of Merom	Joshua 11		Yahweh assists Joshua & Israelites in defeating Canaanite city-states.		Historical
Post-Joshua raids	Judges 2:10–23		A pattern of Israelite apostasy, foreign raids as punishment, and Israelite repentance to Yahweh is established that is repeated throughout the Hebrew Bible. Judges 2 seems a summary of what is to come rather than a unique set of battles.		Historical
Moabite conquest of Israel	Judges 3:12–14		Yahweh punishes Israelites: Eglon's Moabites, Ammonites, Amalekites conquer Israel.		Historical
Battle of the Jordan fords	Judges 3:15–30		Yahweh helps judge Ehud murder Eglon, Israelites defeat and vassalise Moabites.		Historical
Battle of Mount Tabor	Judges 4–5		Judges Deborah and Barak lead Israelites to defeat Jabin's Canaanites.	(mid 12th century BCE)	Historical
Gideon's campaign against the Midianites (Well of Harod)	Judges 6–8		Yahweh assists Gideon in driving out Midianites and other invaders. In return, Gideon destroys all sanctuaries of 'foreign' gods and goddesses such as Baal and Asherah.		Historical
Shechemite rebellion	Judges 9:22–57		Abimelech kills his 70 brothers, becomes king, Shechemites rebel and defeat him.		Historical
Israelite–Ammonite war	Judges 11:4–36		Yahweh helps Jephthah defeat the Ammonites in return for sacrificing his daughter		Historical
Gileadite–Ephraimite war (Shibboleth war)	Judges 12:1–6		Ephraimites complain to Jephthah about not inviting them to help fight the Ammonites. Jephthah's Gileadite army attacks and kills Ephraimites who can't say 'shibboleth'.		Historical
Samson versus Philistines	Judges 15:6–20; Judges 16:27–31		Avenging his wife's murder, Samson attacks and kills 'many' Philistines, with Yahweh's help he kills 1,000 more, and when captured kills 3,000 in a suicide attack.		Historical
Micah's Idol (Sack of Laish)	Judges 18:9–31 (prologue: Judges 17)		600 Danites sack the poorly defended city of Laish. They rename it "Dan", rebuild and repopulate it, and adopt Micah's idolatry.		Historical
Benjamite War / Battle of Gibeah	Judges 19–21		After Levite's concubine's gang-rape, other Israelite tribes attack Benjamites		Historical
Battle of Aphek	1 Samuel 4:1–10 (1 Samuel 2–3)		Because judge Eli's sons were 'wicked', Yahweh allows the Philistines to defeat the Israelites, and capture the Ark of the Covenant.		Historical
Battle of Mizpah	1 Samuel 7:5–14 (1 Samuel 7:1–4)		With the Ark's return, Israelites reject Baal and Ashtoreth worship, reconnect to Yahweh at Mizpah. Philistines attack them, but Yahweh leads Israelites to victory.		Historical
Siege of Jabesh-Gilead	1 Samuel 11		Ammonites besiege Jabesh-Gilead, but Yahweh helps Saul relieve it. Saul is crowned king.	11th century BCE	Probably not historical
Battle of Michmash	1 Samuel 13–14:23	Antiquities of the Jews, VI.6	Israelites led by Saul's son Jonathan defeat Philistines.	11th century BCE	Probably not historical
Saul's campaigns against various tribes	1 Samuel 14:47–48		'Moab, the Ammonites, Edom, the kings of Zobah, and the Philistines', 'the Amalekites'.	11th century BCE	Probably not historical
Saul's Amalekite campaign	1 Samuel 15:1–11		Saul exterminates Amalekites. Yahweh rejects Saul as king for not killing Amalekite livestock.	11th century BCE	Probably not historical
David or Elhanan versus Goliath	1 Samuel 17; 2 Samuel 21:19 (1 Chronicles 20:5)		1 Samuel 17:48–50: David kills Goliath of Gath in single combat in the Valley of Elah; 2 Samuel 21:19: Elhanan, son of Jaare-oregim kills Goliath the Gittite in the Battle of Gob; (1 Chronicles 20:5: Elhanan, son of Jair kills Lahmi, brother of Goliath the Gittite in battle)	11th century BCE	Probably not historical
Foreskin war	1 Samuel 18:24–30 (2 Samuel 3:14)		1 Samuel 18: David kills 200 Philistines and takes their foreskins as bride price for Michal. (2 Samuel 3: David betrothed Michal for 100 Philistine foreskins, demands Saul deliver her.)	11th century BCE	Probably not historical
Battle of Mount Gilboa	1 Samuel 28:4; 1 Samuel 31:1–4; 2 Samuel 1:1–16; 1 Chronicles 10	Josephus	Philistines invade and defeat Israelites.: 1 Samuel 31 & 1 Chronicles 10: Saul lets his armour-bearer kill him.; 2 Samuel 1: Saul lets a passing Amalekite kill him.	11th century BCE	Probably not historical
David versus Ish-bosheth	2 Samuel 2:8–4:5		War of succession upon Saul's death between his son Ish-bosheth and son-in-law David.	c. 1000 BCE	Probably not historical
Pool of Gibeon	2 Samuel 2:12–17		David versus Ish-bosheth battle	c. 1000 BCE	Probably not historical
Siege of Jebus	2 Samuel 5:6–10; 1 Chronicles 11:4–5	None	David conquers Canaanite city Jebus, makes it his capital (Jerusalem?)	c. 1000 BCE	Probably not historical
Siege of Rabbah	2 Samuel 11		Israelites led by Joab besiege the Ammonite city of Rabbah. David arranges Uriah's death in battle, so that he can take Uriah's wife Bathsheba.	c. 1000 BCE	Probably not historical
Battle of the Wood of Ephraim	2 Samuel 17:24–18:18 (proper: 2 Sam 18:6–8)		David's army defeats and kills his rebellious son Absalom	c. 1000 BCE	Probably not historical
Battles of Baal-perazim and the Valley of Rephaim	2 Samuel 5:17–25; 1 Chronicles 14:8–16		David defeats the Philistines	c. 1000 BCE	Maybe historical
Jeroboam's Revolt	1 Kings 11; 2 Chronicles 13	Archeological findings	United monarchy splits into kingdoms of Israel (Samaria) and Judah (Jerusalem)	c. 931–913 BCE	Maybe historical
Shishak's sack of Jerusalem	1 Kings 14:25; 2 Chronicles 12:1–12	(Shoshenq I?)	Egyptian pharaoh Shishak sacks Jerusalem during Rehoboam's reign	c. 926 BCE	Maybe historical
Battle of Mount Zemaraim	1 Kings 12; 2 Chronicles 13		Judahites repel an Israelite invasion	c. 913 BCE	Maybe historical
Battle of Zephath	2 Chronicles 14:8–15	(Osorkon I/II?)	Yahweh helps Asa of Judah defeat Zerah the Cushite, killing 1 million troops	c. 911–870 BCE	Probably not historical
Tibni–Omri war (Siege of Tirzah)	1 Kings 16:21–22 (1 Kings 16:15–20)		War of succession after usurper Zimri killed king Elah of Israel. Started with Omri's brief siege of Tirzah, then 4-year war against Tibni.	c. 886 to 883 BCE.	Maybe historical
Israelite–Aramean War	1 Kings 20:1–34; 2 Kings 6:8–7:16		Ahab & Israelites defeat Aram-Damascus	c. 874 BCE	Mix of fact and fiction
Edomite and Libnahite revolts Battle of Zair	2 Kings 8:20–22; 2 Chronicles 21:8–10		The Judahite vassal states Edom and Libnah revolt against Judah. Judahite chariots try to reclaim Edom, but are defeated at Zair, Jehoram narrowly escaping.	c. 845 BCE	Historical
Philistine–Arab raid on Judah	2 Chronicles 21:12–17		Yahweh curses Jehoram of Judah, causes Philistine/Arab raiders to invade Judah	c. 845 BCE	Historical
Sack of Tiphsah	2 Kings 15:16		Menahem kills Shallum, becomes king, sacks city of Tiphsah for not opening its gates.	c. 745 BCE	Historical
Tiglath-Pileser III's conquest of the Levant	2 Kings 15:19–20,29; 2 Kings 16:5–9		Tiglath-Pileser III invades several times, increasing Assyrian power.	743–732 BCE	Historical
Syro-Ephraimite War	2 Kings 16:5; 2 Chronicles 28 (Isaiah 7:1)		Assyria and Judah defeat Aram-Damascus and Israel	736–732 BCE	Historical
Siege of Samaria	2 Kings 17:3–6; 2 Kings 18:9–11	Babylonian Chronicle	Shalmaneser V besieges and conquers Samaria, destroys Kingdom of Israel (Samaria), starts Assyrian captivity.	724–722 BCE	Historical
Sennacherib's campaign in the Levant	2 Kings 18–19; Isaiah 36–37; 2 Chronicles 32	Sennacherib's Annals	After Sargon II's death (705 BCE), various Levantine vassal states rebel against Assyria. New Assyrian king Sennacherib reasserts control.	701 BCE	Historical
Siege of Lachish	2 Kings 18; 2 Chronicles 32; Micah 1:13	Sennacherib's Annals; Lachish reliefs Antiquities of the Jews		701 BCE	Historical
Assyrian siege of Jerusalem	2 Kings 18; Chronicles; Isaiah	Sennacherib's Annals; Histories (Herodotus) 2:141?		701 BCE	Historical
Battle of Nineveh (612 BC)	Nahum 2–3 (Book of Jonah)	Persica "Fall of Nineveh" chronicle	Extrabiblical sources: Medes and Babylonians defeat Assyrians and destroy Nineveh; Nahum: Yahweh sends unspecified enemies to punish Nineveh for its sins; (Jonah: Yahweh orders Jonah to warn Nineveh to repent or face punishment)	c. 612 BCE	Historical
Battle of Megiddo (609 BC)	2 Kings 23:29–30; 2 Chronicles 35:20–25 (1 Esdras)	Antiquities of the Jews x.5.1 (Histories (Herodotus) 2:159?); Talmud Lev. 26:6 Taanis 22b	Egyptians & Assyrians defeat Judahites (and kill Josiah?)	609 BCE	Historical
Battle of Carchemish	Ezekiel 30; Jeremiah 46:3–12	Nebuchadnezzar Chronicle; Antiquities of the Jews x.5.1	Babylonians defeat Egyptians and Assyrians	c. 605 BCE	Historical
Judah's revolts against Babylon				c. 601–586 BCE	Historical
Siege of Jerusalem (597 BC)	2 Kings 24:10–16 (Ezekiel?)	Nebuchadnezzar Chronicle	Nebuchadnezzar II besieges and conquers Jerusalem	c. 598–597 BCE	Historical
Siege of Jerusalem (587 BC)	2 Kings 25; 2 Chronicles 36; Lamentations 4, 5 Jeremiah 32–52	Archeological findings	Nebuchadnezzar II besieges and destroys Jerusalem	c. 587–586 BCE	Historical
Purim war	Esther 9:5–16	Antiquities of the Jews xi.6	With King Ahasuerus' help, Jews in the First Persian Empire kill their enemies	5th–4th century BCE	Historical

== See also ==
- Ancient warfare
- The Bible and violence
- Christianity and violence
- Judaism and violence
- Historicity of the Bible
- List of Hebrew Bible events

== Bibliography ==
- Coote, Robert B. (2000). "Conquest: Biblical narrative". In Freedman, David Noel; Myers, Allen C. (eds.). Eerdmans Dictionary of the Bible. Eerdmans. ISBN 9789053565032.
- Dever, William G. (2006). Who Were the Early Israelites and Where Did They Come From?. Eerdmans. ISBN 9780802844163.
- Firth, David G. (2021). Joshua: Evangelical Biblical Theology Commentary. Evangelical Biblical Theology Commentary (EBTC) (illustrated ed.). Lexham Press. ISBN 9781683594406.
- Jacobs, Paul F. (2000). "Jericho". In Freedman, David Noel; Myers, Allen C. (eds.). Eerdmans Dictionary of the Bible. Eerdmans. ISBN 9789053565032.
- Long, Burke O. (1985). "Historical Narrative and the Fictionalizing Imagination". Vetus Testamentum. 35 (4). Brill: 405–416. doi:10.2307/1517757. ISSN 0042-4935. JSTOR 1517757.
- Niditch, Susan (1993). War in the Hebrew Bible: A Study in the Ethics of Violence. Oxford University Press.
- Niditch, Susan (2007). "10. Judges". In Barton, John; Muddiman, John (eds.). The Oxford Bible Commentary (first (paperback) ed.). Oxford University Press. pp. 176–191. ISBN 978-0199277186.
- Thiele, Edwin R. (1983). The Mysterious Numbers of the Hebrew Kings (3rd ed.). Grand Rapids, Michigan: Zondervan. ISBN 978-0-310-36010-0.
- Van Seters, John (1998). "The Pentateuch". In Steven L. McKenzie; Matt Patrick Graham (eds.). The Hebrew Bible Today: An Introduction to Critical Issues. Westminster John Knox Press. ISBN 9780664256524.
