= Genocide in the Hebrew Bible =

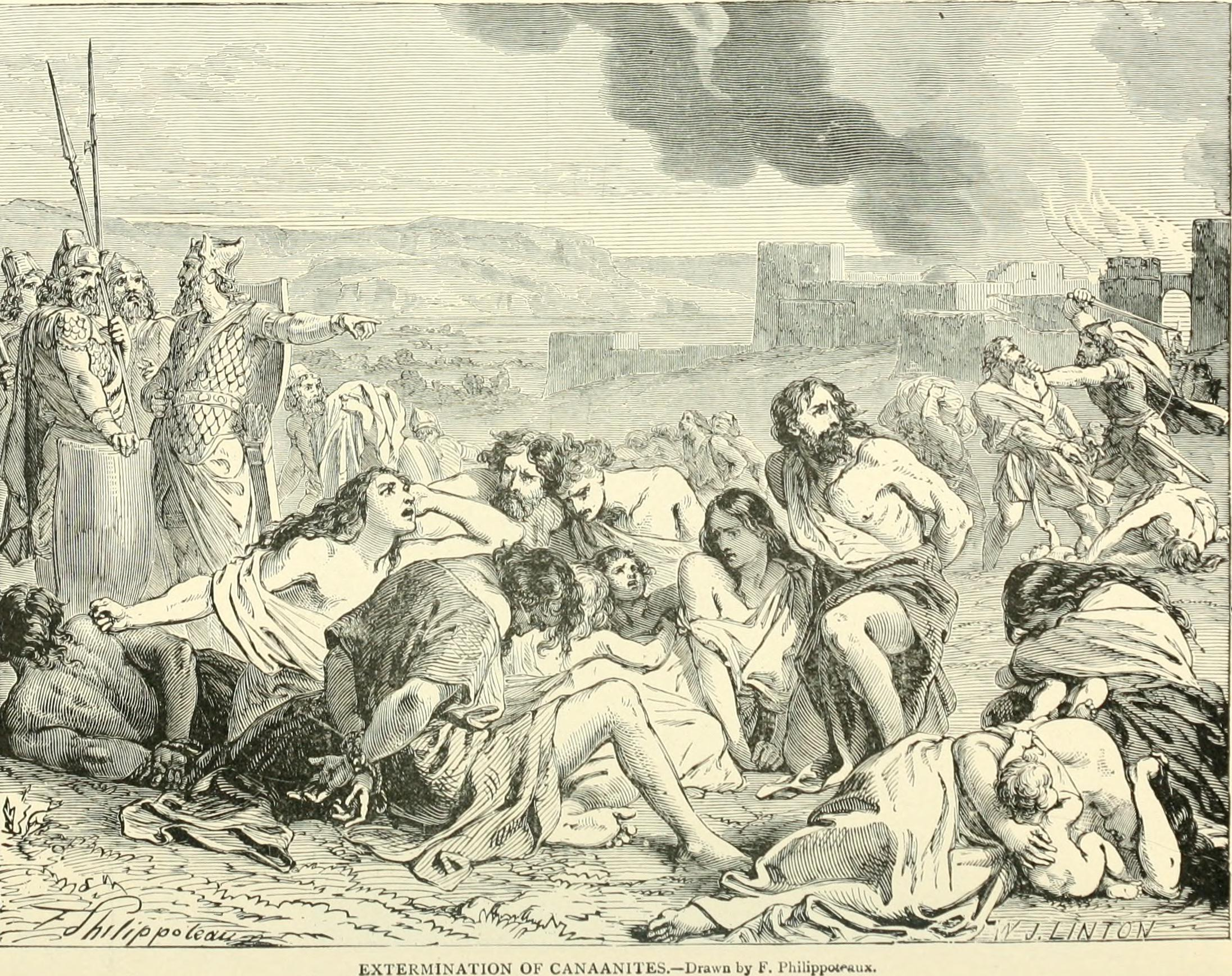
Depiction of the Israelite conquest of Canaan by French painter Henri Félix Emmanuel Philippoteaux, 1912

In the Hebrew Bible (or Old Testament), there are certain narratives describing occurrences of violence and warfare that are considered by some scholars and commentators to qualify as instances of genocide, particularly with regard to armed conflicts involving the Midianites and the Canaanites. Various interpretations have been given of these passages throughout history and of the notion that the Israelites acted on the command of God to wage war against and completely destroy a number of nations, including Amalek.

In contrast, some scholars have disputed the application of genocide as it is understood today to violent biblical events, asserting that such a label is anachronistic. Other scholars have concluded that biblical descriptions of violence are few and mostly hyperbolic, based on comparisons to the literary styles of ancient Israel's neighbouring cultures. Thus, in mainstream scholarship, the historicity of biblical accounts of certain events is a point of contention and much debate.

Some critics of Judaism and Christianity have cited biblical portrayals of violence to argue that the God of Abraham, who is venerated as virtuous and incorruptible in these religions, is actually a malevolent deity. In line with this criticism, these passages have been described as a means for inciting genocide or ethnic cleansing. More recently, analyses of whether the biblical incidents in question amount to genocide has frequently emerged in discourse concerning the Israeli–Palestinian conflict; Israeli prime minister Benjamin Netanyahu became the most noteworthy focus of such criticism during the Gaza war, when his public remarks on biblical passages referencing Amalek were brought before the International Court of Justice as a component of South Africa's genocide case against Israel, wherein South African representatives presented the rhetoric as proof of an Israeli genocide of Palestinians in the Gaza Strip.

== Biblical texts ==
When the Israelites arrive in the Promised Land, they are commanded to annihilate "the Hittites and the Amorites, the Canaanites and the Perizzites, the Hivites and the Jebusites and the Girgashites" who already lived there in order to avoid being tempted into idolatry. Deuteronomy 20:16–17 reads "From the cities of these peoples which YHWH your God is giving you as an inheritance, do not let anything that breathes remain alive. You shall surely annihilate them (haḥărēm taḥărîmēm) ... just as YHWH your God has commanded you so that they may not teach you to do any of the abominations that they do for their gods, and you thus sin against YHWH your God". Joshua is depicted as carrying out these commands.

In Exodus 17, Amalek is introduced as a partially nomadic group that attacked the Israelites following their departure from Egypt. Moses defeats Amalek by a miraculous victory. In 1 Samuel 15:3, Israelite king Saul is told by God via the prophet Samuel: "Now go, attack Amalek, and proscribe [kill and dedicate to YHWH] all that belongs to him. Spare no one, but kill alike men and women, infants and sucklings, oxen and sheep, camels and asses!" Saul's failure to be sufficiently harsh with Amalek is portrayed as leading to his downfall, culminating in his death and the death of three of his sons during a battle with the Philistines at Mount Gilboa.

=== Jewish interpretation ===
Some Jewish scholars, including Maimonides, argued that the commandment to destroy Amalek was still active. Rashi wrote that "the throne of God is incomplete as long as one of Amalek’s descendants is alive", endorsing the persecution of Amalek across many generations. Anyone who is perceived as being an enemy of the Jewish people by Orthodox Jews may be branded as Amalek.

=== Christian interpretation ===
Austrian scholar Christian Hofreiter (2018) writes that for Christians, the plain meaning of the Bible and modern ethical beliefs give rise to five contradictory premises: "(1) God is good. (2) The Bible is true. (3) Genocide is atrocious. (4) According to the Bible, God commanded and commended genocide. (5) A good being, let alone the supremely good Being, would never command or commend an atrocity." Of the early Christians, Marcion was most bothered by this dilemma, but his proposed resolution—denying that the God of the Old Testament was the same as the Christian God—was soon condemned as heretical by the Great Church. Origen argued both that the texts were metaphorical and that they represented a different stage of development than the modern Christian church, which was not an earthly kingdom. Augustine suggested resolving the perceived contradiction through divine command theory—whatever God wills is good, thus (3) is false. Some more modern interpretations reject the historicity of the biblical accounts without rejecting any of Hofreiter's five propositions.

Andrew Judd, a writer at The Gospel Coalition, gave a possible way to reject (4), stating that the commanding of genocide could be a mistranslation, as the word often translated to "utterly destroying", herem, can also mean "to ban." He also claimed this reinterpretation could explain other contradictions, such as the prohibition on marrying the Canaanites and the "little archaeological evidence that total destruction of the cities always took place."

=== Scholarly analysis ===
Multiple scholars interpret the book of Joshua as referring to what would now be considered genocide. T. M. Lemos argues that the genocides commanded by God resemble some modern genocides in that they are committed as part of a struggle for land and other resources. Although scholars reject parts of the biblical stories as factual history, some have concluded theologically, that God commanded genocide. However, this has been criticised by some biblical scholars who argue that such a description is anachronistic.

Other scholars have compared the violent language in the Hebrew Bible to that of texts from other cultures in the Ancient Near East and concluded the biblical language is hyperbolic, with John H. Walton noting:

The rhetoric of ancient Near Eastern conquest accounts often employed hyperbolic language to describe the complete annihilation of enemies, but this was not meant to be taken literally. It was a common way of expressing total victory and the removal of a threat to the land and people.

Walton compares the Israelites to Assyria and Babylon, noting that the other nations would carry away and destroy the gods of the enemies they conquered to prevent people of finding something to rally around to stage another rebellion but noting that in Israel's context this was done to prevent the Israelites from embracing idolatry. Egyptologist and biblical scholar Kenneth Kitchen concurred that "the type of rhetoric in question was a regular feature of military reports in the second and first millennia" by citing comparisons between Egyptian texts and also the Mesha Stele as extrabiblical examples of hyperbolic military reports. Historian Philip Jenkins (quoting Phyllis Trible) says the Bible is filled with "texts of terror" but he also asserts these texts are not to be taken literally. Jenkins says eighth century BCE historians added them to embellish their ancestral history and get readers' attention.

Paul Copan argues that the ḥerem commands were hyperbolic since the passages contain merisms such as "man and woman" and Near Easterners valued "bravado and exaggeration" when reporting warfare. Gili Kugler, however, challenges such interpretations, viewing them as apologetic strategies which, even when presented in scholarly form, risk legitimizing violent traditions by presenting them as morally acceptable, thereby “normalizing extreme violence” and perpetuating hostility towards marginalized groups. Dr. Lawson Stone interprets the “from young and old” portion of the Joshua account merism as “from servant to elder”. This reading coupled with a theory that draws upon the Amarna Letters resolves the controversy by narrowing the focus of the violence solely to the Egyptian kings hegemony. And thus, the Israelites are not an invaders, but rather liberators of their original homeland. And, according to David Clines (and contrary to his own assumptions), only 3.3% of words in the entire Hebrew Bible relate to violence (with even less being attributed to God), stating:

I repeat the statistics of words for violence I mentioned at the beginning of the paper: so far I have identified 10,033 occurrences of words for violence, of which 1,865 are in reference to the deity (18.6%). Speaking personally as a pacifist, I suppose I would prefer it if there were no references to violence in the Hebrew Bible at all. And I can admit that when I began this research I expected to be somewhat shocked by what I would uncover. But now that I am so far along in the research, I find the question arising in my mind is, But is it a big number? Let us recall that the Hebrew Bible contains some 303,500 words. The 10,033 occurrences are therefore 3.3% of the whole Hebrew Bible. Is that a big number? And does it seem such a big number if we put the result in this way: almost 97% of the Hebrew Bible is non-violent (in the senses I have described in this paper)?

==== Criticism of Judaism and Christianity ====
Although these verses were not a major feature of ancient pagan criticisms of Judaism and Christianity, some pagans highlighted these verses and they also argued, in Hofreiter's words, "if (2) is true, then (4) is also true; however, if (4) is true, then (1) is false because (3) and (5) are true; if, however, (1) is false, then Christianity is false". Christians at the time believed in biblical inerrancy and therefore (2) being false would have also invalidated their interpretation of Christianity. The genocide in the Hebrew Bible has been cited by some irreligious critics as a reason for rejecting Christianity, leading to apologetic defenses of the biblical Israelites.

== Influence on historical events ==
The memory of Biblical conflicts was evoked multiple times on different occasions to justify violence against enemies.

=== Medieval and early modern period ===
==== Crusader ideology ====
When instigating the First Crusade, Pope Urban II considered Muslims to be Amalek, and believed that the Crusaders as the successors of Israel were obligated to destroy them.

==== Christian sectarianism and antisemitism ====
During the Reformation, Martin Luther often harbored negative attitudes towards Jews, and at one point had referred to them as Amalek on the basis of alleged collective responsibility of the death of Jesus.

Calvinists who were anti-Catholic often referred to Catholics as Amalek.

==== European colonization of the Americas ====
The earliest expression of U.S. imperialism is believed to encompass religious attitudes among U.S. Christians that, as part of Manifest Destiny, equated Native Americans with Amalek in order to justify the U.S. government policy of Indian removal, which involved forcing Native American tribes into designated Indian Territories in what numerous scholars have dubbed a genocide.

=== Modern period ===
==== Hutu–Tutsi conflict: Rwandan genocide (1994) ====
A number of Hutu-aligned Rwandan churches became controversial for their role in the Rwandan genocide, with some perpetrators having used biblical narratives (such as Amalek) to dehumanize the Tutsis, who are also mostly Christian.

==== Israeli–Palestinian conflict ====
Since the beginning of the Gaza war in 2023, many Israeli figures proposed arrangements and statements calling for the "transfer" of Palestinians from the Gaza Strip as well as Israeli resettlement there. These statements have been characterized as an incitement to genocide against Palestinians in the Gaza Strip in light of Israel's invasion of the Gaza Strip, which has consisted of an extensive bombing campaign that has caused a Palestinian humanitarian crisis, which, in turn, has gained increasing scrutiny among many countries and international organizations as amounting to an ongoing genocide. Prime Minister Benjamin Netanyahu's reference to Amalek at the beginning of the war was cited in South Africa's genocide case against Israel, though he has claimed that he referred only to Hamas. Some scholars have observed that this rhetoric goes back to the 1947–1949 Palestine war because some religious Israeli leaders justified the 1948 Palestinian expulsion and flight by juxtaposing Palestinians with Amalek as a result of the intercommunal conflict in Mandatory Palestine, during which there was heightened violence between Arab nationalists and Jewish Zionists.

== See also ==
- Ancient warfare
  - War in the Hebrew Bible
- Judaism and violence
- Christianity and violence

== Sources ==
- Flannery, Frances (2021). ""I will be an enemy to your enemies": the genocidal ideal in the Hebrew Bible and its legacy". Religion and Violence in Western Traditions: Selected Studies. Routledge Studies in Religion. Routledge. ISBN 978-1-000-40908-6.
- Hofreiter, Christian (2018). Making Sense of Old Testament Genocide: Christian Interpretations of Herem Passages. Oxford University Press. ISBN 978-0-19-881090-2.
- Jacobs, Steven Leonard (2021). The Routledge Handbook of Religion, Mass Atrocity, and Genocide. Routledge. ISBN 978-1-000-47190-8.
- Kelley, Shawn (2016). "Genocide, the Bible, and Biblical Scholarship". Brill Research Perspectives in Biblical Interpretation. 1 (3). Brill: 1–71. doi:10.1163/24057657-12340003. ISSN 2405-7649.
- Kugler, Gili (2021). "Metaphysical Hatred and Sacred Genocide: The Questionable Role of Amalek in Biblical Literature". Journal of Genocide Research. 23 (1): 1–16. doi:10.1080/14623528.2020.1827781.
- Lemos, T. M. (2016). "Dispossessing Nations: Population Growth, Scarcity, and Genocide in Ancient Israel and Twentieth-Century Rwanda". Ritual Violence in the Hebrew Bible. Oxford University Press. pp. 27–66. ISBN 978-0-19-024958-8.
- Alkhouri, Yousef Kamal (2024-11-21). "Which Gospel? The Militarization of Sacred Texts in Israel's Genocide in Gaza". International Journal of Public Theology. 18 (4): 488–508. doi:10.1163/15697320-20241612. ISSN 1569-7320. Archived from the original on 2024-12-15.
