= Aner =

Aner (/ˈeɪnər/; Hebrew: עָנֵר ‘Ānêr ) refers, in the Hebrew Bible, to:

- One of three Amorite confederates of Abram living in the Hebron area, who joined his forces with those of Abram to assist in the rescue of Lot, Abram's nephew, captured during the Battle of Siddim (Genesis 14:13ff, 24).
- A city of Manasseh given to the Levites of Kohath's family (1 Chronicles 6:55). Most scribes agree that a scribal error is at play here, and that the city of "Aner" is the same as biblical Taanach.

== See also ==
- Mamre
- Eshcol
- Battle of Siddim
- Chedorlaomer
