= Battle of Mizpah =

Battle described in the Book of Samuel

According to the Book of Samuel, the Battle of Mizpah (1084 BC) was a battle in which Samuel summoned the people of Israel to the hill of Mizpah, and led them against the Philistines.
