= Amalek =

Nation described in the Bible

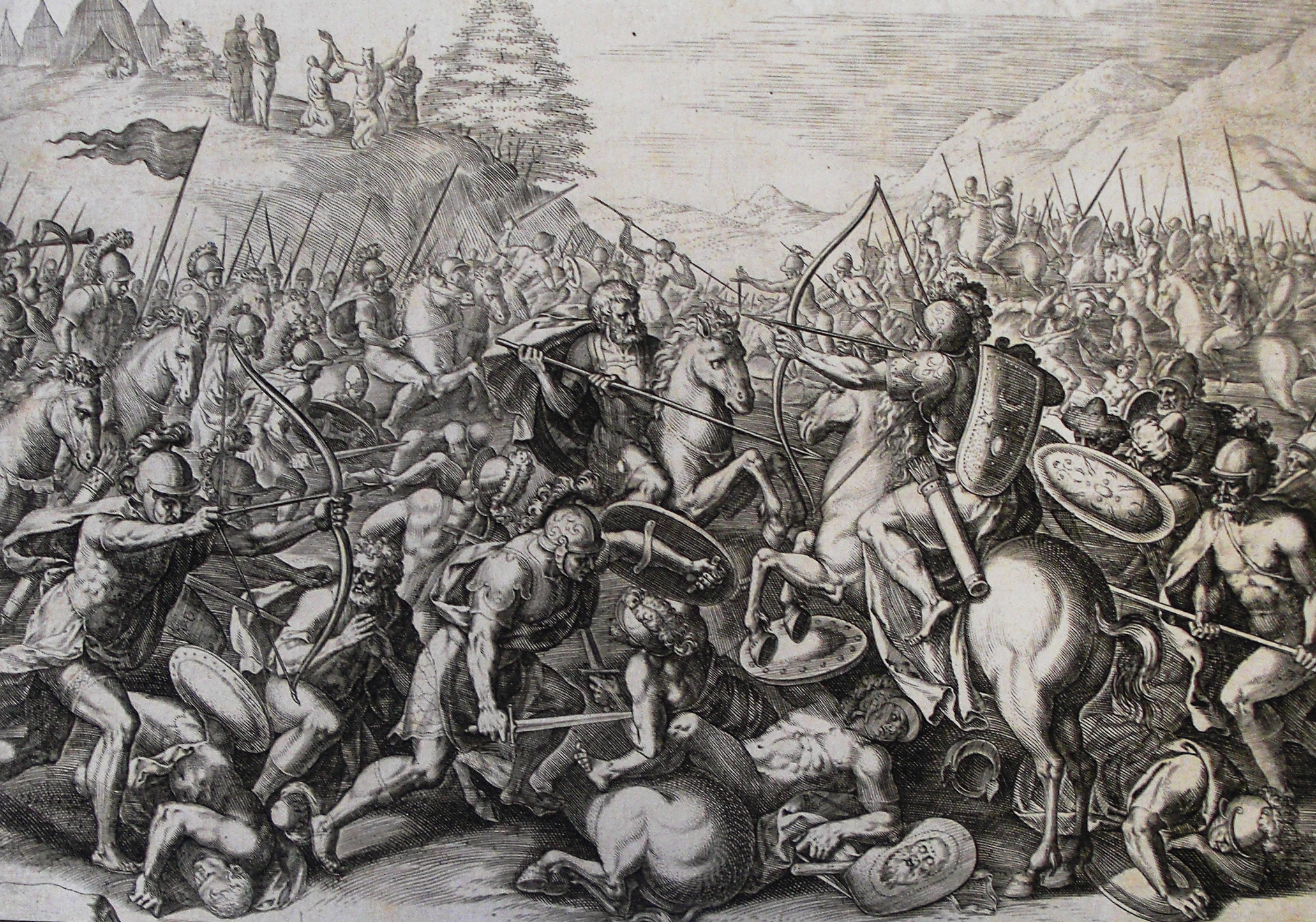
Illustration from Phillip Medhurst Collection depicting Joshua fighting Amalek (Exodus 17).

Amalek (/ˈæməlɛk/; Hebrew: עֲמָלֵק, romanized: ʿĂmālēq; Arabic: عماليق) was a nation described in the Hebrew Bible as a staunch enemy of the Israelites. The name "Amalek" can refer to the nation's founder, a grandson of Esau; his descendants, the Amalekites; or the territories of Amalek, which they inhabited.

According to the Torah, there is a commandment to blot out the memory of Amalek from under heaven.

== Etymology ==
Most scholars consider the origin of the term "Amalek" to be unknown, but in some rabbinical interpretations, it is etymologized as am lak, 'a people who lick (blood)'.

Richard C. Steiner has suggested that the name is derived from the Egyptian term *ꜥꜣm rqj "hostile Asiatic", possibly referring to Shasu tribesmen from around Edom.

== In the Bible ==
According to the Bible, Amalek was the son of Eliphaz (himself the son of Esau, ancestor of the Edomites and the brother of Israel) and Eliphaz's concubine Timna. Timna was a Horite and sister of Lotan. According to a midrash, Timna was a princess who tried to convert. However, she was rejected by Abraham, Isaac and Jacob. She replied she would rather be a handmaiden to the dregs of Israel than be a mistress of another gentile nation. To punish the Patriarchs for their attitudes, God caused Timna to give birth to Amalek, whose descendants would cause Israel much distress. Amalek was also the product of an incestuous union since Eliphaz was Timna's stepfather according to 1 Chronicles 1:36, after he committed adultery with the wife of Seir the Horite, who was Timna's biological father. First-century Roman Jewish scholar and historian Josephus refers to Amalek as a "bastard" (Koine Greek: νόθος); the Hebrew equivalent, mamzer, is a specific category of persons born from a forbidden relationship.

=== Amalekites ===
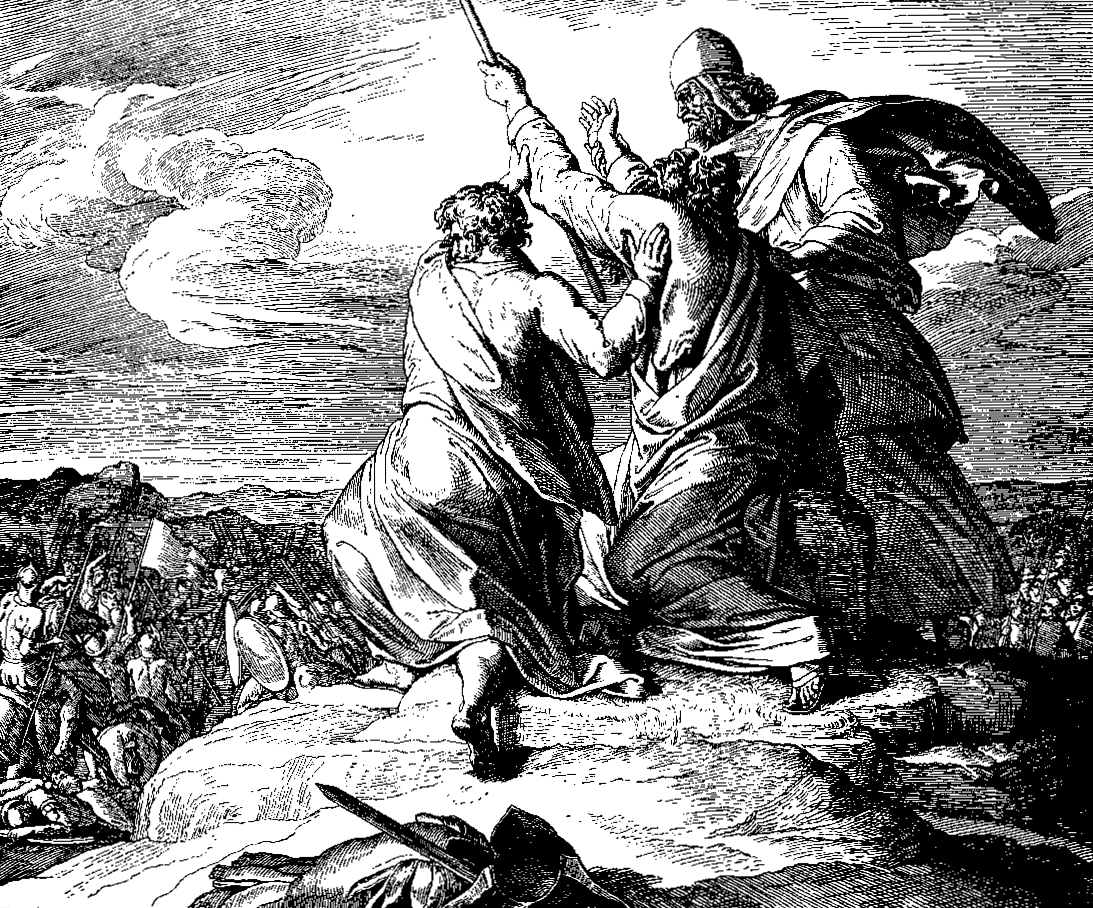
Battle with the Amalekites, by Julius Schnorr von Carolsfeld (1860), representing Exodus 17:8–16.

Amalek is described in Genesis 36:16 as the "chief of Amalek" among the "chiefs of the sons of Esau", from which it is surmised that he ruled a clan or territory named after him. In the oracle of Balaam, Amalek was called the "first of the nations". One modern scholar believes this attests to Amalek's high antiquity, while traditional commentator Rashi states: "He came before all of them to make war with Israel". The Amalekites (/ˈæməlɛkaɪts/) were claimed to be Amalek's descendants through the genealogy of Esau.

According to the Hebrew Bible, the Amalekites inhabited the Negev and Sinai Peninsula. They appear to have lived a nomadic or seminomadic lifestyle along the fringes of southern Canaan's agricultural zone. This is probably based on the association of this tribal group with the steppe region of ancient Israel and the area of Kadesh (Genesis 14:7).

As a people, the Amalekites are identified throughout the Bible as a recurrent enemy of the Israelites:

- In Exodus 17:8–16, during the Exodus, the Amalekites ambush the Israelites encamped at Rephidim, but are defeated. Moses orders Joshua to lead the Israelites into battle, while Moses, Aaron and Hur watch from a nearby hill. When Moses' hands holding his staff are raised, the Israelites prevail, but when his hands are lowered, the Israelites falter. He sits with his hands held up by Aaron and Hur until sunset, securing the Israelite victory.
- In Deuteronomy 25:17–19, the Israelites are specifically commanded to "blot out the remembrance of Amalek from under heaven" once they have taken possession of the Promised Land, in retribution for "what Amalek did to [them] on the way as [they] were coming out of Egypt", a reference to the Amalekite ambush on the Israelites at Rephidim. Earlier, in Deuteronomy 7:1–16 and Deuteronomy 25:16–18, they are commanded to utterly destroy all the inhabitants of the idolatrous cities in the promised land and their livestock; scripture purports that King Saul ultimately loses favor with Yahweh for failing to kill King Agag and the best livestock of the Amalekites in 1 Samuel 15 in defiance of these commandments.
- In Numbers 14:45, the Amalekites and Canaanites kill a group of Israelites who tried to enter the hill country of the Amorites without Moses's permission.
- In Judges 3:13, Amalek, and their Moabite and Ammonite allies, defeat Israel so that the Moabites could oppress them. Judges 10:11–13 confirms Amalek as being one of the many oppressors of Israel.
- In Judges 6:1–6, Amalek, and their Midianite allies, destroy Israelite farms "as far as Gaza", inducing a famine. They also help the Midianites wage wars against Israel, according to Judges 6:32–34 and Judges 7:11–13.
- In 1 Samuel 15:1–9, Samuel identifies Amalek as the enemy of Israelites, saying "Thus says the Lord of hosts: I will punish Amalek for what he did to Israel, how he ambushed him on the way when he came up from Egypt", a reference to Exodus. God then commands Saul to destroy the Amalekites, by killing man, woman, infant and suckling. This massacre is believed to be a retelling of the raids in 1 Samuel 14:48, although it additionally specifies that it occurred in the "city of Amalek", which was believed to be the "principal place of arms" or the "metropolis" of Amalek. In 1 Samuel 15:33, Samuel identifies King Agag of Amalek as an enemy and killer, saying "As your sword has made women childless, so shall your mother be childless among women."
- In 1 Samuel 27:8–9, David and his men conduct raids against the Amalekites and their Geshurite and Gezirite allies. He kills every man and woman but takes sheep, cattle, donkey, camels, and clothing. These Amalekites were theorized to be refugees who fled from Saul or a separate Amalekite faction that dwelt to the south of Israel. Gili Kugler believes these narratives were anti-Saul propaganda, designed to make him appear weak compared to David, since no losses were attributed to David.
- According to 1 Samuel 30:1–2, the Amalekites invaded the Negev and Ziklag in the Judean/Philistine border area towards the end of the reign of King Saul, burning Ziklag and taking its citizens away into captivity. David led a successful mission against the Amalekites to recover "all that the Amalekites had carried away".
- In 2 Samuel 1:5–10, an Amalekite tells David that he found Saul leaning on his spear after the battle of Gilboa. The Amalekite claims he euthanized Saul, at Saul's request, and removed his crown. David gives orders to his men to kill the Amalekite for killing the anointed king, believing him to be guilty by admission.
- In 1 Chronicles 4:43, the Simeonites kill the remaining survivors of Amalek and live in their settlements.
- In Psalm 83:7, Amalek joins Israel's other historic enemies in annihilating Israel. Their attempts are thwarted by God. Although most scholars believe the passage refers to a real historical event, they are unsure which event it should be identified with. One likely answer is that it occurred during the rise of the Neo-Assyrian Empire, the 9th to 7th centuries BC.
- The Hebrew Bible connects "Haman the son of Hammedatha the Agagite" (Esther 3:1), the genocidal antagonist of the Book of Esther, to Agag, king of Amalek, whom the Israelites failed to kill too late (I Samuel 15:9).

== Interpretation ==
=== Judaism ===
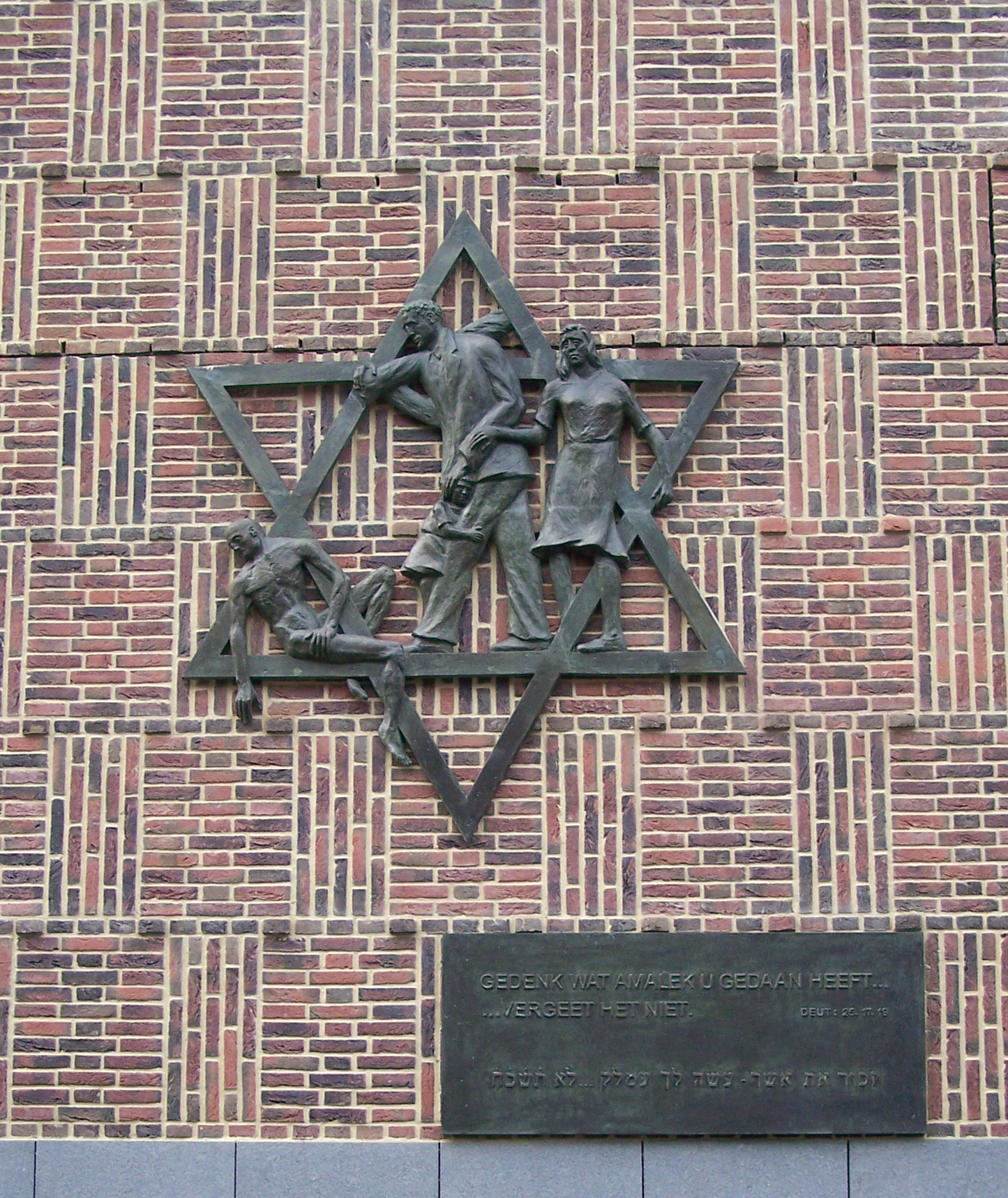
"Davidstern" (Star of David) by Dick Stins is a Holocaust memorial in The Hague. The text at the side (in Dutch and Hebrew) is from Deuteronomy 25:17, 19 – "Remember what Amalek has done to you ... do not forget."

In the Mishneh Torah, Maimonides derived three commandments, two positive and one negative, related to references to Amalek in the Torah:

#	Type	Commandment	Source
59	Negative	Not to forget the wicked deeds which Amalek perpetrated against us	"Do not forget" (Deut. 25:19)
188	Positive	To exterminate the seed of Amalek	"You shall blot out the memory of Amalek" (Deut. 25:19)
189	Positive	To constantly remember what Amalek did to us	"Remember what Amalek did to you" (Deut. 25:17)

Many rabbinic authorities such as Maimonides ruled that the commandment only applies to a Jewish king or an organized community, and cannot be performed by an individual. According to Rashi, the Amalekites were sorcerers who could transform themselves to resemble animals, in order to avoid capture. Thus, in 1 Samuel 15:3, it was considered necessary to destroy the livestock when destroying Amalek. According to Haggahot Maimuniyyot, the commandment only applies to the Messianic Age and not present times; medieval authorities widely support this limitation. According to the Midrash, every nation on Earth has a guardian angel overseeing its destiny, except for two: Israel rejected archangel Michael as its guardian, in favor of God himself. The other is Amalek, whose guardian angel is the foremost angel of evil, Satan. The final war will be fought between the children of God and the children of Satan, between good and evil. This is possibly why the 188th commandment exists: to wipe out Amalek completely, male and female, young and old, sparing none, since evil has no future. However, one obscure prophecy states that all nations will eventually worship God alone, which raises the question of how there can be a Third Temple when Amalek is annihilated. The Midrash state there is no quandary, given the last Amalekite is a convert to Judaism.

Maimonides elaborates that when the Jewish people wage war against Amalek, they must request the Amalekites to accept the Seven Laws of Noah and pay a tax to the Jewish kingdom. If they refuse, they are to be executed.

The Zohar interprets the concept of Amalek differently: not as a distinct ethnic nation, but as the evil inclination (yetzer hara) present in every person, which must be eradicated and this interpretation became widespread among Sephardi Jewish commentators.

Other Talmudic commentators argued that the calls to spare no Amalekite or "blot out their memory" were metaphorical and did not require the actual killing of Amalekites. Samson Raphael Hirsch said that the command was to destroy "the remembrance of Amalek" rather than actual Amalekites. Yehudah Aryeh Leib Alter interpreted the command as thoroughly hating Amalek without performing any physical action. Yisrael Meir Kagan said that God would perform the elimination of Amalek and that Jews only need to remember what Amalek did to them.

Isaac S.D. Sassoon believes that the ḥerem commands existed to prevent the Jewish community from being endangered but believes people should think twice before literally following them. Nathan Lopes Cardozo argues that the Torah's ethically questionable laws were intentional since they were a result of God working with an underdeveloped world. He believes that God appointed the Chazal to help humanity evolve in their understanding of the Torah.

=== Christianity ===
Theologian Charles Ellicott explains that the Amalekites were subject to ḥerem in the Book of Samuel for incapacitation due to their 'accursed' nature and the threat they posed to the commonwealth of surrounding nations. Matthew Henry considers the ḥerem to be defensive warfare since the Amalekites were invaders. John Gill describes the ḥerem as the law of retaliation being carried out.

According to Christian Hofreiter, almost all Christian authorities and theologians have historically interpreted the ḥerem passages literally. He states that "there is practically no historical evidence that anyone in the Great Church" viewed them as being purely an allegory. In particular, Augustine, Thomas Aquinas and John Calvin have defended a literal reading of these passages at length. Origen is sometimes cited as having viewed the ḥerem passages allegorically; Hofreiter argues that although Origen prioritized a spiritual interpretation of the Bible, he did not deny that the herem passages described historical events.

=== Modern academia ===
Some commentators have discussed the ethics of the commandment to exterminate all the Amalekites, including children, and the presumption of collective punishment. It has also been described as genocidal, according to genocide scholars like Norman Naimark.

Gili Kugler of the University of Haifa argues that the biblical condemnation of Amalek is reflective of the Israelites' fears of national destruction or a recurring historical evil, thus providing an answer to the problem of evil. It also reflected the Israelites' attempts to consolidate their ethnic identity since Amalek was acknowledged to be related to Israel but nonetheless, represented the "unwelcome brother and the rejected son". Kugler also argued that the Israelites perceived Amalek to be a reflection of themselves, containing everything that they hated, which they sought to eradicate. The emphasis of Amalek's destruction in the Book of Samuel additionally highlighted the leadership qualities of Saul and David.

According to Ada Taggar-Cohen of Doshisha University, ḥerem commands were not uncommon in the ancient Near East. These commands had a dual purpose: convey to an enemy that the aggressor's deity was on their side, and that the enemy deserved the deity's wrath as punishment for their "sins". They also allowed kings to pursue militarist policies without accepting moral responsibility. C. L. Crouch of Radboud University considers the ḥerem commands to be an exceptional component to Israelite and Judahite warfare. They were erratically applied, even in the early stages of national and ethnic identity formation, and were an extreme means to eradicate the threat of chaos, views shared by Assyrian rulers such as Esarhaddon and Assurbanipal.

Paul Copan argues that the ḥerem commands were hyperbolic since the passages contain merisms such as "man and woman" and Near Easterners valued "bravado and exaggeration" when reporting warfare. Kugler believes this is an earnest attempt to absolve the Israelites, and their God, of moral responsibility. Nonetheless, she argues Copan's interpretation still "normalizes mass violence" and "hostility towards targeted groups". However, scholars such as John H. Walton and Kenneth Kitchen also concluded that such language in the Hebrew Bible was hyperbolic, based on comparisons to the language of other literary cultures.

== Historicity ==
Egyptian and Assyrian monumental inscriptions and records lack any reference to Amalek or the Amalekites, even though both recorded various tribes and peoples of the Levant. This led archaeologist Hugo Winckler to conclude that the Amalekites and the Biblical stories about them were ahistorical. Although archaeological research has improved knowledge about nomadic Arabs, no specific findings definitively link to Amalek.

However, some scholars propose a connection between Amalekites and certain fortified settlements in the Negev highlands, such as Tel Masos near Beersheba, which is possibly equivalent to ancient Hormah. If true, Saul's campaigns against the Amalekites may have been motivated by a strategic desire to control copper production at Tel Masos, a valuable resource for the early Israelites and their theology and rituals.

Further archaeological evidence from sites in the Negev like Tell el-Qudeirat and Horvat Haluqim, dating to the late 11th to early 10th century BC, could corroborate with the Biblical Israelite-Amalekite confrontations during the reigns of Saul and David. Hendrik J. Bruins of Ben Gurion University of the Negev discovered that their inhabitants were semi-nomadic agro-pastoralists who lived in tents, rode camels, traded copper, and worshipped gods at masseboth shrines. Oval fortresses were built during the relevant timeframe. Still, other scholars attribute these settlements to the Edomites or Simeonites.

=== Alternative theories of origin ===
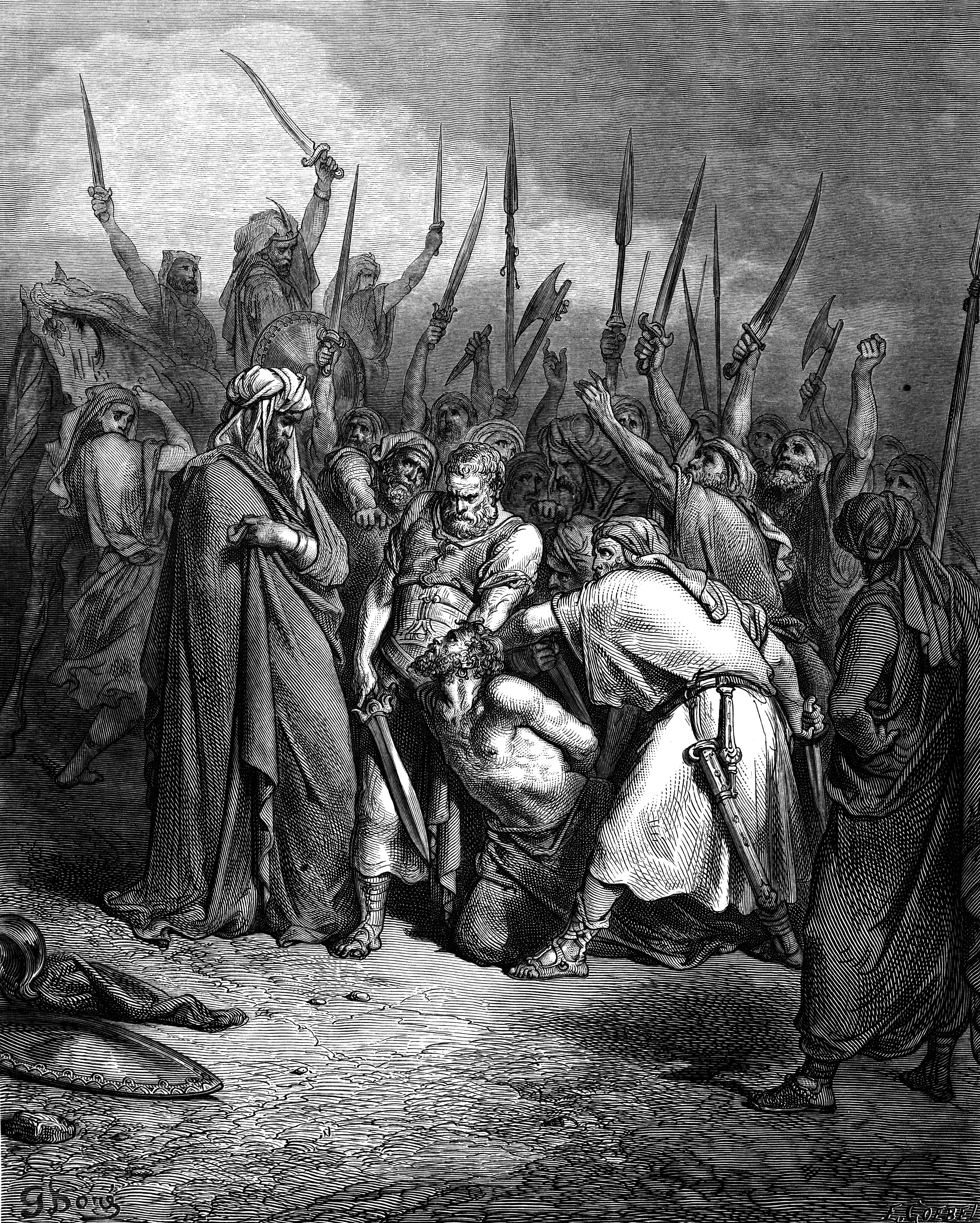
Gustave Doré, The Death of Agag. "Agag" may have been the hereditary name of the Amalekite kings. The one depicted was killed by Samuel (1 Samuel 15).

In Genesis 14:7, the country or "field" of the Amalekites is mentioned without reference to a person named Amalek. Some commentators, including Rashi, claim that this passage is a reference to the territory which was later inhabited by the Amalekites. C. Knight elaborates this concept by making a comparison: one might say "Caesar went into France", although Gaul only later became known as France.

John Gill believes the Amalekites of Genesis 14:7 were equivalent to the Hamite-Arabian Amalekites described by Muslim scholars. He argues the Amalekites were always allied with the Canaanites who descended from Ham, were conquered by the Shemite Chedorlaomer, existed before the Edomite Amalekites thus affirming Numbers 24:20, and that the Edomites never rescued these Amalekites from Saul's campaigns due to inter-tribal feuds.

By the 19th century, many Western theologians believed that the nation of Amalek could have flourished before the time of Abraham. Matthew George Easton theorized that the Amalekites were not the descendants of Amalek by taking a literal approach to Genesis 14:7. However, the modern biblical scholar Gerald L. Mattingly uses textual analysis to glean that the use of Amalekite in Genesis 14:7 is actually an anachronism, and in the early 19th century, Richard Watson enumerated several speculative reasons for the existence of a "more ancient Amalek" than Abraham.

In his exegesis of Numbers 24:20, concerning Balaam's utterance: "Amalek was the first one of the nations, but his end afterward will be even his perishing", Richard Watson attempts to associate this passage to the "first one of the nations" that developed post-Flood. According to Samuel Cox, the Amalekites were the "first" in their hostility toward the Israelites.

== Abrahamic traditions ==
=== Jewish traditions ===
Amalek is the archetypal enemy of the Jews and the symbol of evil in Jewish religion and folklore. Nur Masalha, Elliot Horowitz, and Josef Stern suggest that the Amalekites represent an "eternally irreconciliable enemy" that wants to murder Jews. In post-biblical times, Jews associated contemporary enemies with Amalek or Haman and, occasionally, believed pre-emptive violence is acceptable against such enemies. Groups identified with Amalek include the Romans, Nazis, Stalinists, Islamic State, and bellicose Iranian leaders such as Mahmoud Ahmadinejad. More metaphorically, to some Hasidic rabbis (particularly the Baal Shem Tov), Amalek represents atheism or the cynical rejection of God, which leads to unethical hedonism. This is sometimes known as the "Amalekite doctrine". In contemporary times, religious Jews associate Amalek with violent antisemites, nihilism and Jewish doubt in God.

During the Purim festival, the Book of Esther is read in commemoration of the salvation of Jewish people from Haman, who plotted to kill all Jews in Persian Empire. It is customary for the audience to make noise and shout whenever "Haman" is mentioned, in order to desecrate his name, based on Exodus 17:14. It is also customary to recite Deuteronomy 25:17–18 on the Shabbat before Purim. This was because Haman was considered to be an Amalekite, although this label may perhaps be symbolic rather than literal. Some Iranophilic Jews interpreted Haman's Amalekite background as being anathema to both Jews and 'pure-blooded Iranians'.

In the past, some Jews associated Amalek with the Roman Empire and medieval Christians. Armenians were especially associated with Amalek from the 10th century onward, with the term being used exclusively to describe them in the 19th century. According to Michael Wex in Born to Kvetch, Armenians were formerly known colloquially among Yiddish-speakers as mokh, from the Hebrew word for "put out; blot out" used in Exodus 17:14.

Most contemporary rabbis now say that Amalek no longer exists as a unified nation, based on the argument that Sennacherib deported and mixed the nations, so it is now impossible to determine who is an Amalekite. Hence, the command to kill Amalekites no longer holds in Jewish law. Instead, the behaviour Jewish tradition says was a characteristic of Amalek still exists and needs to be destroyed. This can be by removing certain negative character traits in an individual. Since the Holocaust, the phrase as it appears in Deuteronomy 25:17 is used as a call to witness. It appears on a banner at Israel's memorial to the Holocaust, Yad Vashem, and Yad Vashem archives include letters between European Jews during the Holocaust in which they plead with one another to bear witness should they survive. It is also inscribed, at The Hague, on a memorial to Dutch Jews murdered during the Holocaust.

=== Christian traditions ===
Early Church fathers such as Justin Martyr, Irenaeus and Cyprian consider the defeat of Amalek in Exodus 17:8–13 to be reminiscent of Jesus defeating the powers of the devil at the cross. Origen sees the battle as an allegory of the Law mysteriously invoking Christ, who recruits strong people (i.e. Christians) to defeat the demonic Strong Man, as described in Ephesians 6:12.

John Gill believes that Amalek is a type of antichrist that 'raises his hand against the throne of God, his tabernacle and his saints'. He believes the phrase "from generation to generation" in Exodus 17:16 specifically refers to the Messianic Age, where Amalek and other antichristian states are exterminated by the Lamb. Likewise, Charles Ellicott notes that the Amalekites were collectively called 'the sinners' in 1 Samuel 15:18, which was only used elsewhere for the Sodomites in Genesis 13:13.

Carl Friedrich Keil and Franz Delitzsch state that the Amalekites were extinct by the second half of Hezekiah's reign.

Professor Philip Jenkins notes that Christian extremists have historically labelled enemies such as Native Americans, Protestants, Catholics and Tutsis as Amalekites to justify their genocides. Jews and victims of the Crusades were also called Amalekites. Because of this, modern Christian scholars have re-examined the Biblical narratives that inspired these atrocities by using philology, literary analysis, archaeology and historical evidence.

=== Islamic traditions ===
Islamic commentators believe that the Amalekites were an ancient Arabian tribe. The monotheistic Ishmaelites evangelized to them in Mecca and later, they supplanted their population. However, the paganism of the Amalekites and other Arabian tribes negatively influenced the Ishmaelites, including their approach to the Kaaba.

Ibn Khaldūn believed that God ordered Saul, the king of Israel, to depose the Amalekites, which caused Haman's hostility to the Jews in the Book of Esther.

Adam J. Silverstein observes that most scholars who lived in the medieval Muslim world ignored the Book of Esther or they modified the details of it, despite their familiarity with the Persian Jewish community. This was caused by their attempt to reconcile the Biblical Esther with the Quranic Haman, who was the antagonist of the Exodus narrative, and Persian mythological historical traditions. Notable exceptions include Ibn Khaldūn, who affirmed the Amalekite origins of Haman and his antisemitic vendetta.

== Evocation of Amalek ==
=== 19th–20th centuries ===
Many have identified Adolf Hitler as an Amalekite. According to the Hebrew Bible, Amalek lived in Canaan: "Amalek dwells in the south land" (Numbers 13:29). The Israelites were instructed to kill all those who dwelled in Canaan: "thou shalt save alive nothing that breathes" (Deuteronomy 19:16), otherwise "I shall do to you, as I thought to do to them" (Numbers 33:56). Amalek and Israel were archenemies, their enmity originating from the Battle of Refidim, where the Amalekites targeted and killed weak Israelites. As a result, God decreed Amalek to be obliterated "from beneath the heavens" (Deuteronomy 25:19). The Hebrew Bible connects "Haman the son of Hammedatha the Agagite" (Esther 3:1), the genocidal antagonist of the Book of Esther, to Agag, king of Amalek, whom the Israelites failed to kill (I Samuel 15:9). According to these verses Hitler may be seen as a result of this failure. However, Hitler could also be seen as a "symbolic" Amalekite.

In 1898, when the German Emperor Wilhelm visited Jerusalem, all Jews wanted to see him pass. Other Rabbis asked why the revered Rabbi Yosef Chaim Sonnenfeld refused – especially as it would have given him the rare opportunity of reciting the blessing on seeing a major non-Jewish leader. Rabbi Sonnenfeld stated that he had a tradition from the Vilna Gaon that descendants of Amalek were in Germany and so it would be wrong to praise the Kaiser.

The idea of linking Germany with Amalek is based on a word in the Talmud (Megilla 6b). This word was interpreted by Vilna Gaon to mean the area of current Germany. This was identified as a nation including descendents of Amalek who would cause massive harm to Jews – as was the case during the Nazi era.

=== Israeli–Palestinian conflict ===
In 2004, Israeli activists Moshe Feiglin and Benzi Lieberman compared Palestinians to Amalek, stated that the Palestinians are the Amalekites, or accused Arabs as a class of "engag[ing] in typical Amalek behavior", according to journalist Jeffrey Goldberg. Yasser Arafat was called "the Amalek and Hitler of our generation" by 200 rabbis. Many in the Gush Emunim movement see Arabs as the "Amalek of today". According to some rabbis from the National Religious camp, Amalek is any nation that prevents Jews from settling in the Land of Israel, which includes the Palestinians, as they refuse to leave their ancestral homeland.

Baruch Goldstein, who killed 29 Palestinians at the Cave of Patriarchs, compared Palestinians to Amalekites, seeing both as desert-dwelling "predators" of the Jewish people. Goldstein's mass shooting itself happened shortly after the reading of the Amalek narrative on Shabbat Zachor prior to Purim in 1994.

==== Gaza war ====
Amidst the Gaza war, Israeli prime minister Benjamin Netanyahu gave a speech during which he said: "You must remember what Amalek has done to you, says our Holy Bible. And we do remember." South Africa, in a hearing at the International Court of Justice (ICJ) for their case accusing Israel of committing genocide in Gaza, presented the comments as inciting genocide against the Palestinian people. Netanyahu denied that was his intention, stating the South African governments' accusation reflected a "deep historical ignorance" since he was referring to Hamas.

Several members of the Israeli Knesset, including Avihai Boaron, Itamar Ben-Gvir, Amihai Eliyahu, Tally Gotliv, and Bezalel Smotrich, have invoked the commandment to wipe out the memory of Amalek in reference to the war in Gaza.

In response to the accusations in the ICJ case, the Israel Democracy Institute issued a legal opinion stating that the references to Amalek in the context of the war were misunderstood. According to the opinion, the commandment to annihilate Amalek has effectively been erased from Jewish law; moreover, the indictment misquoted Netanyahu: he did not refer to the commandment to annihilate Amalek, but rather to the commandment to remember what Amalek did. In addition it argued that statements made by Israeli speakers were directed against members of Hamas, not against the Palestinian population of Gaza as a whole.

There have been examples of secular Zionists also using the Amalek metaphor. For example, Ariel Porat, the president of Tel Aviv University, cited the example of Amalek to justify Israel's attack on Gaza.

=== 2026 Iran war ===
After an Iranian strike on Beit Shemesh during the 2026 Iran war on 2 March, Netanyahu said "We read in this week's Torah portion, 'Remember what Amalek did to you.' We remember—and we act."

== See also ==
- Agag, an ancestor of Haman
- The Bible and violence
- Genocide in the Hebrew Bible
- Antisemitism
- Anti-Arabism
