= Eshcol =

Term in the Hebrew Bible

Eshcol (/ˈɛʃˌkɒl/, Hebrew: אֶשְׁכֹּל ’Eškōl) is a term in the Hebrew Bible. It may refer to:

- One of three Amorite confederates of Abram in the Hebron area, who, with his brothers Mamre and Aner, joined forces with those of Abram in pursuit of king Chedorlaomer and his armies who had taken Abram's nephew Lot and others as captives. (Genesis 14:13–24)
- A valley in which the twelve spies obtained an enormous cluster of grapes in Numbers 13:23–24, at "the brook Eshcol" (called "the valley of Eshcol" in Numbers 32:9 and Deuteronomy 1:24), which they took back with them to the camp of Israel as a specimen of the fruits of the Promised Land. (Note: Easton on Eshcol: On their way back they explored the route which led into the south (the Negeb) by the western edge of the mountains at Telilat el-’Anab, i.e., 'grape-mounds', near Beersheba. "In one of these extensive valleys, perhaps in Wady Hanein, where miles of grape-mounds even now meet the eye, they cut the gigantic clusters of grapes, and gathered the pomegranates and figs, to show how goodly was the land which the Lord had promised for their inheritance.", see Palmer's Desert of the Exodus.) The Wycliffe Bible Encyclopedia notes that the valley is still very fruitful.

== See also ==
- List of biblical places
- Mamre
- Aner
- Battle of Siddim
- Chedorlaomer
