= Herem (war or property) =

Biblical Hebrew term

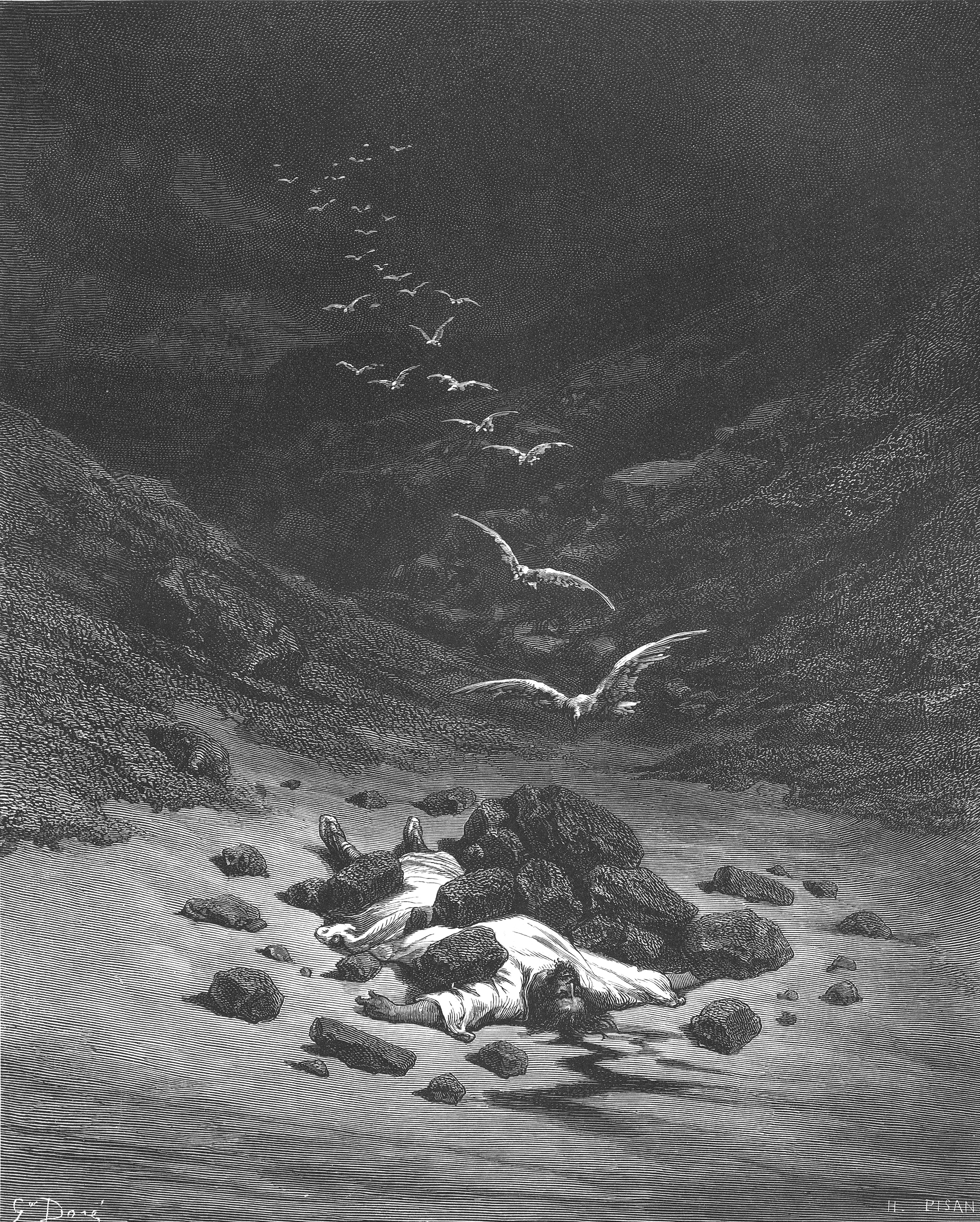
The Stoning of Achan by Gustav Doré. Achan pillaged gold, silver, and a costly garment from Jericho, and was punished by stoning.

Herem or cherem (Hebrew: חֵרֶם, ḥērem), as used in the Tanakh, means something given over to the Lord, or under a ban, and sometimes refers to things or persons to be utterly destroyed. The term has been explained in different and sometimes conflicting ways by different scholars. It has been defined as "a mode of secluding, and rendering harmless, anything imperilling the religious life of the nation", or "the total destruction of the enemy and his goods at the conclusion of a campaign", or "uncompromising consecration of property and dedication of the property to God without possibility of recall or redemption". It is translated into Latin as devotio, a word used for human sacrifice, and into Greek as anathema, which was a sacrifice to the gods (and later to God).

A related verb, heḥərîm (החרים), means "to treat as ḥērem", or "destroy utterly".

== Etymology ==
The word comes from the semitic root Ḥ-R-M with meanings having to do with prohibiting and sanctity. There is another root, ḫ-r-m, which can mean to destroy or annihilate. In the Masoretic Text of the Tanakh the verb form occurs 51 times, while the noun occurs 38 times. Although the word basically means something devoted or given over to God (as in Leviticus 27:28), it often refers to "a ban for utter destruction". There is also a homonym, herem, meaning fisherman's net, which occurs 9 times in the masoretic text and is regarded as etymologically unrelated, according to the Brown Driver Briggs Lexicon. It is related to the Arabic root ḫ-r-m, which can also mean to perforate.

== Sources ==
The word is often used in the 6th and 7th chapters of the Book of Joshua, where Jericho came under herem. This meant it had to be completely destroyed, except for "the silver and gold and the articles of bronze and iron" which were to go into "YHWH's treasury" (Joshua 6:19). The following chapter describes how Achan pillaged an ingot of gold, a quantity of silver, and a costly garment for himself, and was executed by stoning.

Deuteronomy 20:17 also names six people groups who were to be subject to the ḥērem (using the verb): the Hittites, Amorites, Canaanites, Perizzites, Hivites and Jebusites.

In the Book of Judges, chapters 19–21, the Israelite town of Jabesh-Gilead was put under herem for not joining in battle against the Tribe of Benjamin.

King Saul put the priestly town of Nob under herem, nearly wiping out the priestly House of Eli.

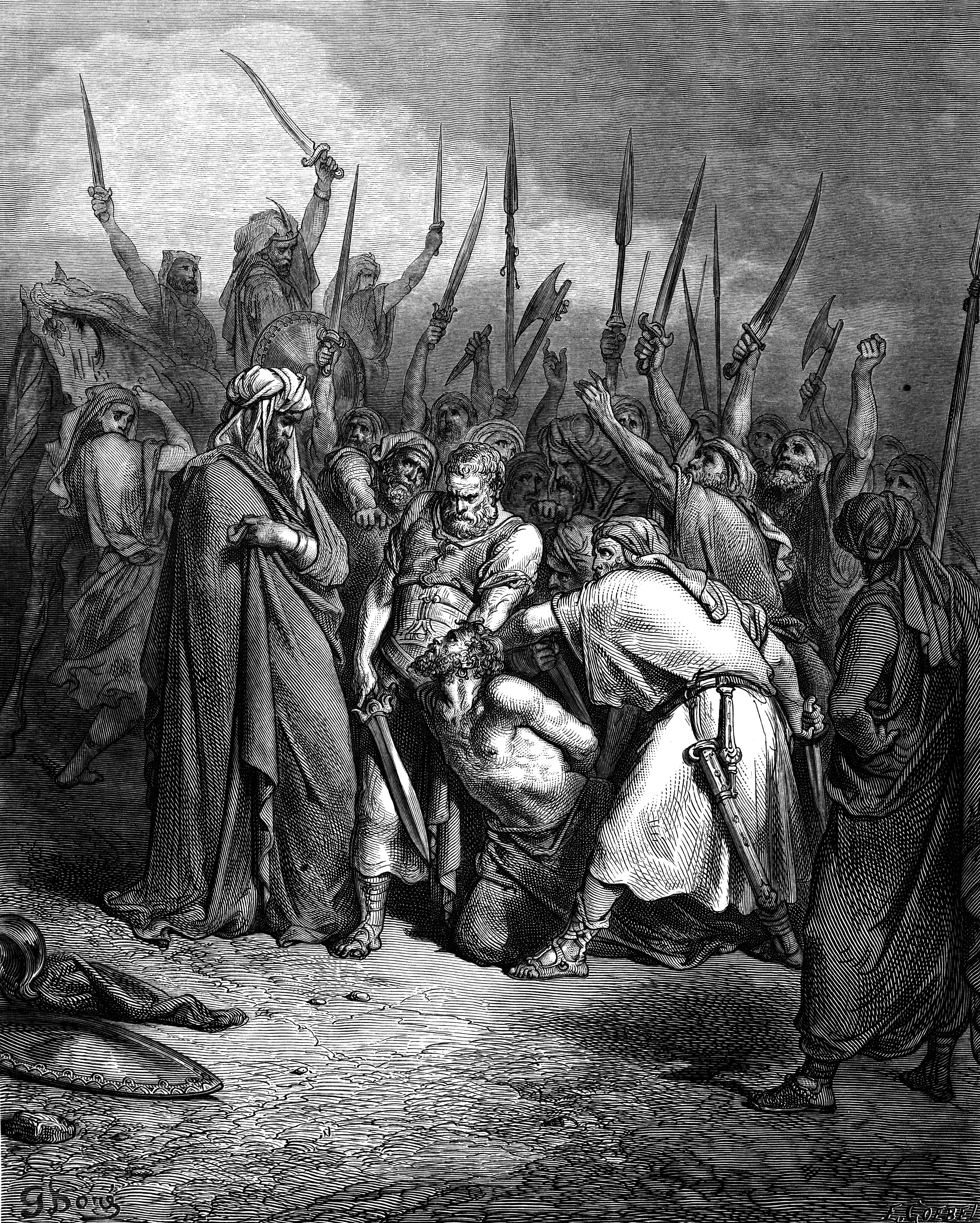
Gustave Doré, The Death of Agag. Agag was executed by Samuel as part of God's command to put the Amalekites under herem (1 Samuel 15).

The concept of herem also appears in 1 Samuel 15, where Saul "totally destroyed" (verse 8, NIV) the Amalekites with the sword, but spared their king, Agag, and kept "the best of the sheep and cattle, the fat calves and lambs—everything that was good." For this, Saul is rebuked by Samuel, who reminds him that God had commanded him to "completely destroy" the Amalekites (verse 15). Samuel "hacked Agag to pieces" himself (verse 33, ESV).

The word herem is the last word of the prophetic books of the Hebrew Bible: "… lest I come and strike the land with a decree of utter destruction" (Malachi 4:6, ESV).

Most scholars conclude that the biblical accounts of extermination are exaggerated, fictional, or metaphorical. In the archaeological community, the consensus of modern scholars is that the story of battle and the associated extermination are a pious fiction and did not happen as described in the Book of Joshua. For example, the Book of Joshua arguably describes the extermination of the Canaanite tribes, yet Joshua 16:10 and Judges 1:1–2:5 both say that the extermination was not complete.

== Meaning and significance ==
William Dumbrell suggests that "the ban appears to have been conceived as an acknowledgment of Yahweh's help." He also notes that "everything likely to contaminate Israel religiously" was destroyed, and thus the institution of the ban was "designed not to counter a military threat but to counter a religious threat." Similarly, Balchin argues that "drastic action was required to keep Israel in holy existence." But Lilley argues that "Israel, like other contemporary societies, did not recognise any distinction between sacred and secular war," and that "holy war" is not a biblical term, "but one invented or at least appropriated by commentators." Lilley goes on to suggest that essence of the idea of herem is an "irrevocable renunciation of any interest" in the object 'devoted', and thus "so far as persons are concerned, the options of enslavement and treaty are not available." He contests the idea that it always involved things imperilling the religious life of the nation, arguing that these things "were to be destroyed out of hand, not given to the sanctuary."

Longman and Reid alternatively suggest that herem was a "sacrifice of the occupants of Canaan in the interest of securing the purity of the land." The concept of herem was not unique to Israel. The Mesha Stele contains a statement by King Mesha of Moab that he captured the town of Nebo and killed all seven thousand people there, "for I had devoted them to destruction for (the god) Ashtar-Chemosh."

Historian Max Ostrovsky finds herem a characteristic element of chiefdom-level warfare worldwide, wherever culture reached the level of chiefdom. Similar bans were practiced before the introduction of slavery and empire which are more characteristic of monarchies. Hence the accounts of the Book of Judges probably reflect historical reality.

== Ethical issues ==
Theologians and other scholars have commented on the ethical and moral dilemmas posed by the wars of extermination, particularly the killing of women and children.

Maimonides applies the rules from Deuteronomy 20:10 (the rules governing discretionary wars) to the war on the Canaanite nation, and suggests that the commandment to exterminate the Canaanites was not absolute. He writes that Joshua gave the Canaanites three options: to flee, to remain and make peace with the Israelites, or to fight.

Rabbi Gunther Plaut asserted that the Torah, itself, never addresses the morality of the wars of extermination. Biblical scholar Sidney Hoenig discussed the "brutality" in the book of Joshua, but concluded that the "battle is only in honor of God". The Mennonite scholar John Howard Yoder suggests that the concept of herem was unique in relation to the morality of the time not in its violence, but in ensuring that "war does not become a source of immediate enrichment through plunder", and hence was the beginning of a trajectory that would lead ultimately to the teaching of nonviolence. Scholars Ian Lustick and Leonard B. Glick quote Shlomo Aviner as saying "from the point of view of mankind's humanistic morality we were in the wrong in [taking the land] from the Canaanites. There is only one catch. The command of God ordered us to be the people of the Land of Israel".

Some scholars claim that collective punishment, particularly punishment of descendants for transgressions committed by ancestors, is common in the Hebrew Bible—a view based primarily on repeated descriptions (with slightly varied wording) of God as "a jealous God, punishing the children for the sin of the fathers to the third and fourth generation … but showing love to a thousand {generations} of those who love me and keep my commandments."

=== As genocide ===
Several scholars and commentators have characterized the wars of extermination as genocide. Scholar Pekka Pitkanen asserts that Deuteronomy involves "demonization of the opponent", which is typical of genocide, and he asserts that the genocide of the Canaanites was due to unique circumstances, and that "the biblical material should not be read as giving license for repeating it." Scholar Philip Jenkins characterizes the warfare of the Bible as genocidal, and considers the laws of warfare in the Quran to be more humane than the Biblical rules. Scholar M. I. Rey argues that Deut 21:10–14 constitutes a form of genocidal rape based on definitions according to international law, and the gravity of the practice should not be minimized solely because it does not display the totalizing destruction and annihilation seen in herem (despite being labeled "herem-like").

Other scholars have criticised the usage of "genocide" as a word to describe biblical events while other scholars believe the events themselves were hyperbolic and not intended to be taken literally, based on comparisons to neighbouring literary cultures. John H. Walton compares the Israelites to Assyria and Babylon, noting that the other nations would carry away and destroy the gods of the enemies they conquered to prevent people of finding something to rally around to stage another rebellion but noting that in Israel's context this was done to prevent the Israelites from embracing idolatry. Egyptologist and biblical scholar Kenneth Kitchen concurred that "the type of rhetoric in question was a regular feature of military reports in the second and first millennia" by citing comparisons between Egyptian texts and also the Mesha Stele as extrabiblical examples of hyperbolic military reports. Historian Philip Jenkins (quoting Phyllis Trible) says the Bible is filled with "texts of terror" but he also asserts these texts are not to be taken literally. Jenkins says eighth century BCE historians added them to embellish their ancestral history and get readers' attention.

=== Justifications and rationalizations ===
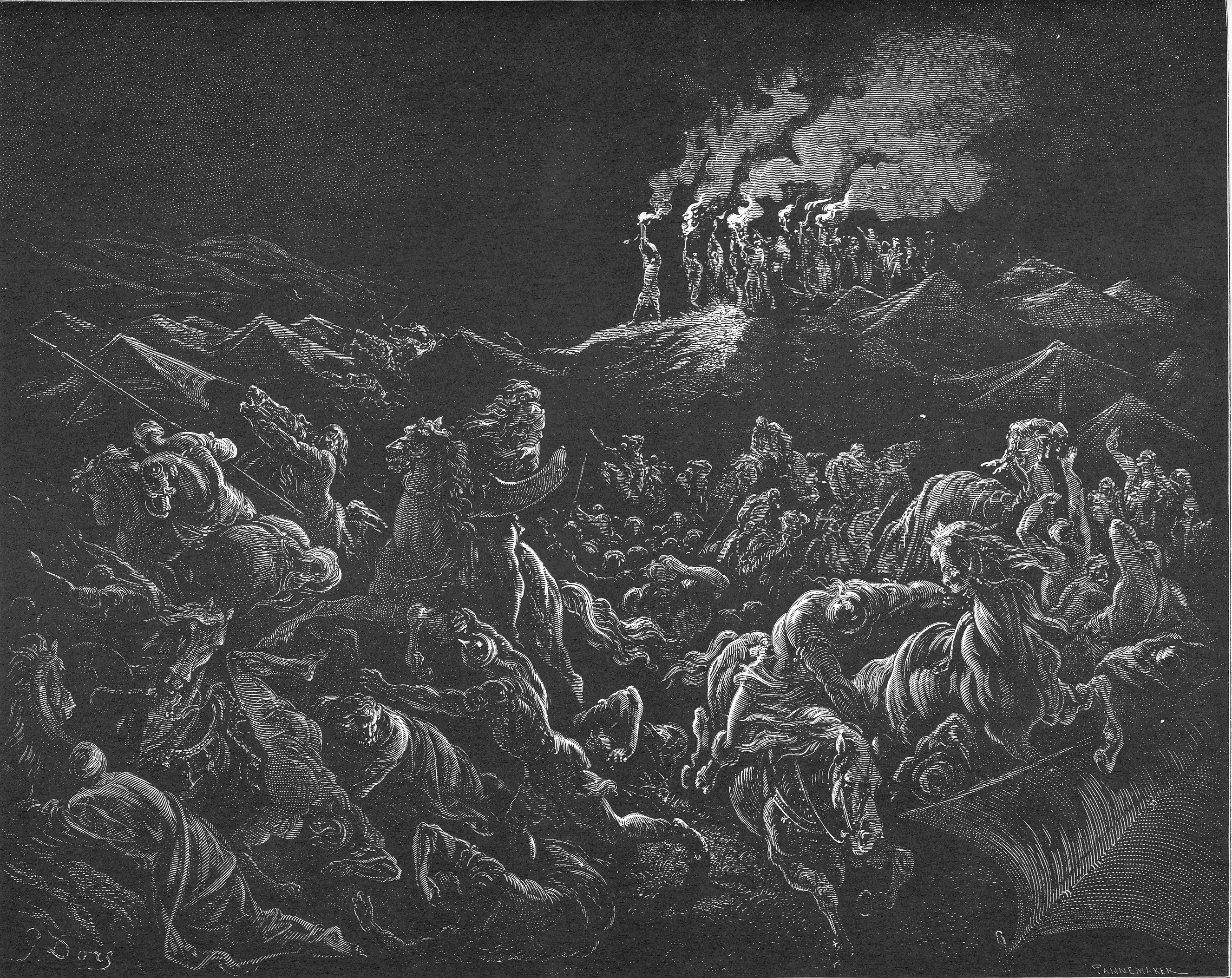
The Midianites Are Routed by Gustave Dore

Several justifications and explanations for the extreme violence associated with the wars of extermination have been offered, some found in the Hebrew Bible, others provided by Rabbinic commentators, and others hypothesized by scholars. These include:

- Punishment: the Canaanites were considered sinful, depraved people, and their deaths were punishments; the Bible promises a similar fate for the Israelites if they engaged in the same behavior.
- Prevention: In Deut 20:16–18 God tells the Israelites to exterminate the Canaanite nations, "otherwise, they will teach you to follow all the detestable things they do in worshiping their gods, and you will sin against the Lord your God".
- Revenge: the war against the Midianites was revenge for Midian's role in Israel's apostate behavior during the Heresy of Peor (Numbers 25:1–18), or for the Midianites' sale of Joseph into slavery in Egypt (Genesis 37:28–36).
- To make room for the returning Israelites: the Canaanite nations were living in the land of Israel, but when the Israelites returned, the Canaanites were expected to leave the land.

According to the Talmud, the Canaanite nations were first given the opportunity to avoid extermination by voluntarily leaving the land, and in fact one Canaanite nation (the Girgashites) did so. Another Talmudic explanation suggested God gave the land to the Canaanites only temporarily, until the Israelites would arrive, and the Canaanites' extermination was punishment for their refusal to obey God's desire that they leave. Another explanation proposed that wars in the Book of Joshua were a diversionary tactic, so that Israelites would not kill Joshua after discovering that he had forgotten certain laws.

Michael S. Heiser notes that the herem in the Book of Joshua predominately targets the Anakim, descendants of the Nephilim (Deuteronomy 9:2, Numbers 13:32-33, Joshua 11:21-22). The Nephilim are believed to be the offspring of fallen angels and mankind so thus, Heiser argues that the purpose of the herem is to also prevent the physical corruption of the Israelites.

==== Association with violent attitudes in the modern era ====
Some analysts have associated the biblical commandments of extermination with violent attitudes in modern era.

According to Ian Lustick, in the 1980s, leaders of the now defunct Israeli messianic and political movement Gush Emunim, such as Hanan Porat, considered the Palestinians to be like Canaanites or Amalekites, and suggested that implied a duty to make merciless war against Arabs who reject Jewish sovereignty.

Biblical scholar Niels Peter Lemche asserts that European colonialism in the nineteenth century was ideologically based on the biblical narratives of conquest and extermination. He also states that European Jews who migrated to Palestine relied on the biblical ideology of conquest and extermination, and considered the Arabs to be Canaanites. Scholar Arthur Grenke claims that the view of war expressed in Deuteronomy contributed to the destruction of Native Americans and to the destruction of European Jewry.

Nur Masalha, a Palestinian writer and academic, writes that the genocide of the extermination commandments has been "kept before subsequent generations" and served as inspirational examples of divine support for slaughtering enemies. Ra'anan S. Boustan, an associate professor of ancient Mediterranean religions at UCLA, has said that militant Zionists have identified modern Palestinians with Canaanites, and hence as targets of violence mandated in Deut 20:15-18. Scholar Leonard B. Glick states that Jewish fundamentalists in Israel, such as Shlomo Aviner, consider the Palestinians to be like biblical Canaanites, and that some fundamentalist leaders suggest that they "must be prepared to destroy" the Palestinians if the Palestinians do not leave the land. Keith Whitelam, professor emeritus of Biblical Studies in the University of Sheffield, asserts that the Zionist movement has drawn inspiration from the biblical conquest tradition, and Whitelam draws parallels between the "genocidal Israelites" of Joshua and modern Zionists.

==== Contrary views ====
A formal declaration that the “seven nations” are no longer identifiable was made by Joshua ben Hananiah, around the year 100 CE.

Scholar Moshe Greenberg asserts that the laws of extermination applied only to the extinct tribes, and only to their contemporary generations of Israelites. Carl Ehrlich states the biblical rules of extermination provide guidance to modern Israelis not for genocidal purposes, but rather simply as models for reclaiming the land of Israel.

==== Christian views ====
According to Christian Hofreiter, historically almost all Christian authorities and theologians have interpreted the herem passages as referring to real, historical events when God commanded the Israelites to exterminate all the members of particular nations. He states that "there is practically no historical evidence that anyone in the Great Church" viewed them as being purely an allegory. In particular, Augustine, Thomas Aquinas and John Calvin have defended a literal reading of these passages at length. Origen of Alexandria is sometimes cited as having viewed the herem passages allegorically; Hofreiter argues that although Origen viewed a spiritual interpretation as having primary importance to Christians, he did not deny that the herem passages described historical events.

== See also ==
- Anathema
- Consecration
- Judaism and violence
- Judaism and war
- War of annihilation
