= 2 Chronicles 12 =

Second Book of Chronicles, chapter 12

- ← chapter 11 chapter 13 →
- The complete Hebrew text of the Books of Chronicles (1st and 2nd Chronicles) in the Leningrad Codex (1008 CE).
- Book: Books of Chronicles
- Category: Ketuvim
- Christian Bible part: Old Testament
- Order in the Christian part: 14

2 Chronicles 12 is the twelfth chapter of the Second Book of Chronicles the Old Testament in the Christian Bible or of the second part of the Books of Chronicles in the Hebrew Bible. The book is compiled from older sources by an unknown person or group, designated by modern scholars as "the Chronicler", and had the final shape established in late fifth or fourth century BCE. This chapter belongs to the section focusing on the kingdom of Judah until its destruction by the Babylonians under Nebuchadnezzar and the beginning of restoration under Cyrus the Great of Persia (2 Chronicles 10 to 36). The focus of this chapter is the kingdom of Israel's division in the beginning of Rehoboam's reign.

== Text ==
This chapter was originally written in the Hebrew language and is divided into 16 verses.

=== Textual witnesses ===
Some early manuscripts containing the text of this chapter in Hebrew are of the Masoretic Text tradition, which includes the Aleppo Codex (10th century), and Codex Leningradensis (1008).

There is also a translation into Koine Greek known as the Septuagint, made in the last few centuries BCE. Extant ancient manuscripts of the Septuagint version include Codex Vaticanus (B; $\mathfrak{G}$^{B}; 4th century), and Codex Alexandrinus (A; $\mathfrak{G}$^{A}; 5th century). (Note: The whole book of 2 Chronicles is missing from the extant Codex Sinaiticus.)

=== Old Testament references ===
- 2 Chronicles 12:1–12: 1 Kings 14:25–28
- 2 Chronicles 12:13–16: 1 Kings 14:21–24

== Shishak attacked Jerusalem (12:1–12) ==
After a short recovery (three years faithfully the law of God; 2 Chronicles 11:17), Rehoboam and the people fell to apostasy, so Egypt could defeat them as a form of punishment. Uzziah also behaved similarly in 2 Chronicles 26:16. The siege of Jerusalem in Rehoboam's time is comparable to the one in Hezekiah's time (2 Chronicles 32).

=== Verse 2 ===
And it came to pass, that in the fifth year of king Rehoboam Shishak king of Egypt came up against Jerusalem, because they had transgressed against the LORD,

- "The fifth year": in Thiele's chronology, this ranges between September 926 and September 925 BCE.
- "Shishak" (Greek transliteration: "Sousakim"): the first Pharaoh mentioned by name in the Bible. He harbored and encouraged Jeroboam when the latter fled from Solomon to Egypt as a rebellious refugee, and was of a different dynasty from the father-in-law of Solomon. According to Septuagint (1 Kings 12:24e) he was related to Jeroboam through their wives (Jeroboam's wife was unnamed in the Masoretic Text, but called "Ano" in Septuagint) as follows:

And Sousakim gave to Jeroboam Ano the eldest sister of Thekemina his wife, to him as wife; she was great among the king's daughters.

Most scholars support the identification by Champollion with Shoshenq I of the 22nd dynasty (ruled Egypt 945–924 BCE), who left behind "explicit records of a campaign into Canaan (scenes; a long list of Canaanite place-names from the Negev to Galilee; stelae), including a stela [found] at Megiddo", and Bubastite Portal at Karnak, although Jerusalem was not mentioned in any of these campaign records. A common variant of Shoshenq's name omits its 'n' glyphs, resulting in a pronunciation like, "Shoshek".

=== Fringe theory identifications ===
- Immanuel Velikovsky in his book Ages in Chaos, identified him with Thutmose III of the 18th dynasty.
- David Rohl's New Chronology identified him with Ramesses II of the 19th dynasty.
- Peter James identified him with Ramesses III of the 20th dynasty.

== Rehoboam's reign and death (12:13–16) ==
This section records events at a further phase of Rehoboam's rule, which follows a tragic pattern: 'As soon as he has recovered, Rehoboam immediately apostasizes again' (cf. verse 1), so the Chronicles notes that 'he did not set his heart to seek the LORD'. The concluding remarks in verses 15–16 distinguishes between the earlier and later acts of Rehoboam, although the time of separation is not entirely clear. His records were written in the books of Shemaiah and Iddo (unclear if they were two separate sources or a single text; cf. e.g. 1 Chronicles 29:29; 2 Chronicles 9:29; also 2 Chronicles 11:2 or 1 Kings 12:22 with different spelling regarding Shemaiah, and 1 Kings 13:22 regarding Iddo, probably identical person as here).

=== Verse 13 ===
Thus King Rehoboam strengthened himself in Jerusalem and reigned. Now Rehoboam was forty-one years old when he became king; and he reigned seventeen years in Jerusalem, the city which the Lord had chosen out of all the tribes of Israel, to put His name there. His mother’s name was Naamah, an Ammonitess

- "Reigned 17 years": in Thiele's chronology (improved by McFall), Rehoboam became king between September 931 and April 930 BCE and died between April and September 913 BCE at the age of 58.

== See also ==
- Jeroboam
- Jerusalem
- Rehoboam
- Shechem
- Related Bible parts: 1 Kings 1, 1 Kings 10, 1 Kings 11, 1 Kings 12, 1 Kings 14, 1 Chronicles 6, 1 Chronicles 18, 1 Chronicles 22, 1 Chronicles 29

== Sources ==
- Ackroyd, Peter R (1993). "Chronicles, Books of". In Metzger, Bruce M; Coogan, Michael D (eds.). The Oxford Companion to the Bible. Oxford University Press. pp. 113–116. ISBN 978-0195046458.
- Bennett, William (2018). The Expositor's Bible: The Books of Chronicles. Litres. ISBN 978-5040825196.
- Coogan, Michael David (2007). Coogan, Michael David; Brettler, Marc Zvi; Newsom, Carol Ann; Perkins, Pheme (eds.). The New Oxford Annotated Bible with the Apocryphal/Deuterocanonical Books: New Revised Standard Version, Issue 48 (Augmented 3rd ed.). Oxford University Press. ISBN 9780195288810.
- Mabie, Frederick (2017). "I. The Chronicler's Genealogical Survey of All Israel". In Longman III, Tremper; Garland, David E (eds.). 1 and 2 Chronicles. The Expositor's Bible Commentary. Zondervan. pp. 267–308. ISBN 978-0310531814.
- Mathys, H. P. (2007). "14. 1 and 2 Chronicles". In Barton, John; Muddiman, John (eds.). The Oxford Bible Commentary (first (paperback) ed.). Oxford University Press. pp. 267–308. ISBN 978-0199277186.
- McFall, Leslie (1991), "Translation Guide to the Chronological Data in Kings and Chronicles" (PDF), Bibliotheca Sacra, 148: 3–45, archived from the original (PDF) on 2010-08-27
- Wallenfels, Ronald (2019). "Shishak and Shoshenq: A Disambiguation". Journal of the American Oriental Society. 139 (2): 487–500. doi:10.7817/jameroriesoci.139.2.0487. JSTOR 10.7817/jameroriesoci.139.2.0487. S2CID 201445669.
- Würthwein, Ernst (1995). The Text of the Old Testament. Translated by Rhodes, Erroll F. Grand Rapids, MI: William B. Eerdmans. ISBN 0-8028-0788-7.
