= 1 Kings 14 =

1 Kings, chapter 14

- ← chapter 13 chapter 15 →
- The pages containing the Books of Kings (1 & 2 Kings) Leningrad Codex (1008 CE).
- Book: First book of Kings
- Hebrew Bible part: Nevi'im
- Order in the Hebrew part: 4
- Category: Former Prophets
- Christian Bible part: Old Testament
- Order in the Christian part: 11

1 Kings 14 is the fourteenth chapter of the Books of Kings in the Hebrew Bible or the First Book of Kings in the Old Testament of the Christian Bible. The book is a compilation of various annals recording the acts of the kings of Israel and Judah by a Deuteronomic compiler in the seventh century BCE, with a supplement added in the sixth century BCE. 1 Kings 12:1 to 16:14 documents the consolidation of the kingdoms of northern Israel and Judah: this chapter focusses on the reigns of Jeroboam and Nadab in the northern kingdom and Rehoboam in the southern kingdom.

== Text ==
This chapter was originally written in the Hebrew language and since the 16th century is divided into 31 verses.

=== Textual witnesses ===
Some early manuscripts containing the text of this chapter in Hebrew are of the Masoretic Text tradition, which includes the Codex Cairensis (895), Aleppo Codex (10th century), and Codex Leningradensis (1008).

There is also a translation into Koine Greek known as the Septuagint, made in the last few centuries BCE. Extant ancient manuscripts of the Septuagint version include Codex Vaticanus (B; $\mathfrak{G}$^{B}; 4th century) and Codex Alexandrinus (A; $\mathfrak{G}$^{A}; 5th century). (Note: The whole book of 1 Kings is missing from the extant Codex Sinaiticus.)

=== Old Testament references ===
- 1 Kings 14:21–24: 2 Chronicles 12:13–14
- 1 Kings 14:25–31: 2 Chronicles 12:1–12

== A breach between Ahijah of Shiloh and Jeroboam (14:1–20) ==
After the event in previous chapter Jeroboam received a further rebuke from Ahijah of Shiloh, when he attempted to cheat the prophet who was already old and blind, to get a word about his sick child. Although Jeroboam's wife was well disguised, the prophet immediately recognized her (in contrast to Genesis 27) and mercilessly revealed that her child (also Jeroboam's) would die (thematically similar to 1 Samuel 9:1–10:16 and 2 Kings 1). The same prophet who prophesied Jeroboam's rise to power (1 Kings 11:29–39) now forecasts the fall of Jeroboam's dynasty, because Jeroboam failed to behave like David. The end of Jeroboam's family would be dishonorable as the bodies of his family members would not be properly buried but would be eaten by 'dogs and birds' (verse 11, cf. 1 Samuel 31:8–13 for the significance of proper burial), and the fulfillment happened quickly in the second year of the reign of Jeroboam's son, Nadab (1 Kings 15:29–30). The pattern of prophecy and fulfilment are common in the books of Kings (cf. 1 Kings 11:29–31 then 12:15; 16:1–4 then 16:11–12; 21:21–23 then 22:38 + 2 Kings 9:36–37; 2 Kings 9:7–10 then 10:17; 21:10–15 then 24:2; 22:16–17 then 25:1–7), emphasizing that the history of Israel is dictated by its relationship to God.

=== Verse 15 ===
For the Lord will smite Israel, as a reed is shaken in the water, and He will uproot Israel from this good land, which he gave to their fathers, and will scatter them beyond the river, because they have made their Asherah poles, provoking the Lord to anger.

- "Asherah poles": Hebrew: asherim. Asherah was a leading Canaanite deity, wife/sister of El and goddess of fertility, commonly worshiped at shrines in or near groves of evergreen trees as well as places marked by wooden poles; God's people should burn or cut them down (Deuteronomy 12:3; 16:21; Judges 6:25, 28, 30; 2 Kings 18:4).

Without a strong, continuous dynasty in the northern kingdom of Israel, the land would know only the instability of 'a reed shaken (blown by the wind) in the water', and finally be exiled to places beyond "the River" (that is, "Euphrates") in Assyria.

=== Verse 20 ===
And the time that Jeroboam reigned was twenty-two years. And he slept with his fathers, and Nadab his son reigned in his place.

- "Twenty-two years": in Thiele's chronology (improved by McFall), Jeroboam became king between September 931 and April 930 BCE and died between September 910 and April 909 BCE.

== Rehoboam's reign in Judah and the attack of Shishak (14:21–31) ==
The proper introductory formula, an editorial principe in Kings, is only now inserted for Rehoboam, although his reign was mentioned in the story of the kingdom's division. It was mentioned twice (verses 21, 31) that Rehoboam's mother was an Ammonite, recalling Solomon's foreign wives and their idol-worship (1 Kings 11:1–8) that caused widespread idolatry in Judah (not confined to Jerusalem, as with Solomon). Standard sentences (verses 22–24) were used repeatedly later in the books of Kings to build the case 'how breaches of the first commandment formed the underlying evil' which led to the downfall (and implicitly, exile) of the kingdom of Judah (and even earlier, the kingdom of [northern] Israel). Just five years after the death of Solomon, Pharaoh Shishak plundered the wealth that Solomon had accumulated as a high price of freedom for Jerusalem, a first sign of warning for 'the city that the LORD had chosen out of all the tribes of Israel, to put his name there' (verse 21). The invasion of Shishak is documented in Egyptian sources and archaeological record, the first event in the Bible to have support from independent witnesses.

=== Verse 21 ===
And Rehoboam the son of Solomon reigned in Judah. Rehoboam was forty and one years old when he began to reign, and he reigned seventeen years in Jerusalem, the city which the Lord did choose out of all the tribes of Israel, to put his name there. And his mother's name was Naamah an Ammonitess.

- "Seventeen years": in Thiele's chronology (improved by McFall), Rehoboam became king between September 931 and April 930 BCE and died between April and September 913 BCE at the age of 58.

=== Verse 25 ===
It happened in the fifth year of King Rehoboam that Shishak king of Egypt came up against Jerusalem.

- "The fifth year of King Rehoboam": in Thiele's chronology (improved by McFall), this ranges between September 926 and September 925 BCE.
- "Shishak" (Greek transliteration: "Sousakim"): the first Pharaoh mentioned by name in the Bible. He harbored and encouraged Jeroboam when the latter fled from Solomon to Egypt as a rebellious refugee, and was of a different dynasty from the father-in-law of Solomon. According to Septuagint (1 Kings 12:24e) he was related to Jeroboam through their wives (Jeroboam's wife was unnamed in the Masoretic Text, but called "Ano" in Septuagint) as follows:

And Sousakim gave to Jeroboam Ano the eldest sister of Thekemina his wife, to him as wife; she was great among the king's daughters.

Most scholars support the identification by Champollion with Shoshenq I of the 22nd dynasty (ruled Egypt 945–924 BCE), who left behind "explicit records of a campaign into Canaan (scenes; a long list of Canaanite place-names from the Negev to Galilee; stelae), including a stela [found] at Megiddo", and Bubastite Portal at Karnak, although Jerusalem was not mentioned in any of these campaign records. A common variant of Shoshenq's name omits its 'n' glyphs, resulting in a pronunciation like, "Shoshek".

=== Fringe theory identifications of Shishak ===
- Immanuel Velikovsky in his book Ages in Chaos, identified him with Thutmose III of the 18th dynasty.
- David Rohl's New Chronology identified him with Ramesses II of the 19th dynasty.
- Peter James identified him with Ramesses III of the 20th dynasty.

== See also ==
- Abijam or Abijah, king of Judah
- Ammon
- Chronicles of the Kings of Israel
- Chronicles of the Kings of Judah
- David
- Egypt
- Idolatry
- Israel
- Jerusalem
- Kingdom of Judah
- Nadab, king of Israel
- Prophet
- Sack of Jerusalem (925 BC)
- Shiloh
- Solomon
- Solomon's Temple
- Tirzah
- Related Bible parts: 1 Kings 11, 1 Kings 12, 1 Kings 13, 1 Kings 15, 2 Kings 23, 2 Chronicles 12

== Sources ==
- Collins, John J. (2014). "Chapter 14: 1 Kings 12 – 2 Kings 25". Introduction to the Hebrew Scriptures. Fortress Press. pp. 277–296. ISBN 978-1451469233.
- Coogan, Michael David (2007). Coogan, Michael David; Brettler, Marc Zvi; Newsom, Carol Ann; Perkins, Pheme (eds.). The New Oxford Annotated Bible with the Apocryphal/Deuterocanonical Books: New Revised Standard Version, Issue 48 (Augmented 3rd ed.). Oxford University Press. ISBN 978-0195288810.
- Dietrich, Walter (2007). "13. 1 and 2 Kings". In Barton, John; Muddiman, John (eds.). The Oxford Bible Commentary (first (paperback) ed.). Oxford University Press. pp. 232–266. ISBN 978-0199277186.
- Halley, Henry H. (1965). Halley's Bible Handbook: an abbreviated Bible commentary (24th (revised) ed.). Zondervan Publishing House. ISBN 0-310-25720-4.
- Hayes, Christine (2015). Introduction to the Bible. Yale University Press. ISBN 978-0300188271.
- Leithart, Peter J. (2006). 1 & 2 Kings. Brazos Theological Commentary on the Bible. Brazos Press. ISBN 978-1587431258.
- McFall, Leslie (1991), "Translation Guide to the Chronological Data in Kings and Chronicles" (PDF), Bibliotheca Sacra, 148: 3–45, archived from the original (PDF) on 2010-08-27
- McKane, William (1993). "Kings, Book of". In Metzger, Bruce M; Coogan, Michael D (eds.). The Oxford Companion to the Bible. Oxford University Press. pp. 409–413. ISBN 978-0195046458.
- Metzger, Bruce M; Coogan, Michael D, eds. (1993). The Oxford Companion to the Bible. Oxford University Press. ISBN 978-0195046458.
- Thiele, Edwin R. (1983). The Mysterious Numbers of the Hebrew Kings (3rd ed.). Grand Rapids, Michigan: Zondervan. ISBN 978-0-310-36010-0.
- Würthwein, Ernst (1995). The Text of the Old Testament. Translated by Rhodes, Erroll F. Grand Rapids, MI: Wm. B. Eerdmans. ISBN 0-8028-0788-7.
