= 2 Chronicles 11 =

Second Book of Chronicles, chapter 11

- ← chapter 10 chapter 12 →
- The complete Hebrew text of the Books of Chronicles (1st and 2nd Chronicles) in the Leningrad Codex (1008 CE).
- Book: Books of Chronicles
- Category: Ketuvim
- Christian Bible part: Old Testament
- Order in the Christian part: 14

2 Chronicles 11 is the eleventh chapter of the Second Book of Chronicles the Old Testament in the Christian Bible or of the second part of the Books of Chronicles in the Hebrew Bible. The book is compiled from older sources by an unknown person or group, designated by modern scholars as "the Chronicler", and had the final shape established in late fifth or fourth century BCE. This chapter belongs to the section focusing on the kingdom of Judah until its destruction by the Babylonians under Nebuchadnezzar and the beginning of restoration under Cyrus the Great of Persia (2 Chronicles 10 to 36).

The focus of this chapter is the fallout from division of the formerly unified kingdom of Israel at the beginning of Rehoboam's reign.

== Text ==
This chapter was originally written in the Hebrew language and is divided into 23 verses.

=== Textual witnesses ===
Some early manuscripts containing the text of this chapter in Hebrew are of the Masoretic Text tradition, which includes the Aleppo Codex (10th century), and Codex Leningradensis (1008).

There is also a translation into Koine Greek known as the Septuagint, made in the last few centuries BCE. Extant ancient manuscripts of the Septuagint version include Codex Vaticanus (B; $\mathfrak{G}$^{B}; 4th century), and Codex Alexandrinus (A; $\mathfrak{G}$^{A}; 5th century). (Note: The whole book of 2 Chronicles is missing from the extant Codex Sinaiticus.)

=== Old Testament references ===
- 2 Chronicles 11:1–4: 1 Kings 12:20–24

== Rehoboam fortifies Judah (verses 1–12) ==
Verses 1–4 parallel 1 Kings 12:21–24, but verses 5–12 has no parallel elsewhere. Rehoboam refrained from attacking Jeroboam because of a prophetic intervention (verse 4), an obedience for which he is rewarded. Instead, Rehoboam transformed some cities into fortresses (verses 6–10), all but Adoraim are mentioned elsewhere in the Hebrew Bible.

=== Verse 4 ===
‘Thus says the Lord:

"You shall not go up or fight against your brethren! Let every man return to his house, for this thing is from Me."‘

Therefore, they obeyed the words of the Lord, and turned back from attacking Jeroboam.

- "This thing is from Me": compared to 2 Chronicles 10:15 "For the cause was of God."

== Rehoboam's supporters and family (verses 13–23) ==
Verses 13-17 describe the consequences in Judah of Jeroboam's cult 'reforms', as it is reported in verse 15 that Jeroboam made idols (1 Kings 12:28–29 detail the placement of two golden calves in Bethel and Dan), then recruited new non-Levite priests who pledged allegiance to him, so the Levites (including the priests; verse 14) and the laymen (verse 16) from the northern kingdom came to Jerusalem for the legitimate sacrificial rite, exactly what Jeroboam wished to avoid with his religious policy. The Chronicles indicates that a large family and numerous children are a sign of God's blessing (without detailing Solomon's large family, perhaps because it is combined with the idolatry) so the family of Rehoboam is recorded especially in relation to the two wives, Mahalath and Maachah, who were closely related to David's family. Like David, his grandfather, Rehoboam places his sons in the administration of the kingdom (verses 22–23; cf. 1 Chronicles 18:17).

=== Verse 14 ===
For the Levites left their suburbs and their possession, and came to Judah and Jerusalem: for Jeroboam and his sons had cast them off from executing the priest's office unto the Lord:

The exodus of the priests and Levites from the northern Israel territory into Judah strengthened the southern kingdom and demonstrated Jeroboam's apostasy (cf. 1 Kings 12:28, 13:33; 14:8–9).

== See also ==
- Jeroboam
- Jerusalem
- Rehoboam
- Shechem
- Related Bible parts: 1 Kings 1, 1 Kings 10, 1 Kings 11, 1 Kings 12, 1 Chronicles 6, 1 Chronicles 18, 1 Chronicles 22, and 1 Chronicles 29
