= Shishak =

Egyptian pharaoh mentioned in the Hebrew Bible, identified with Shoshenq I

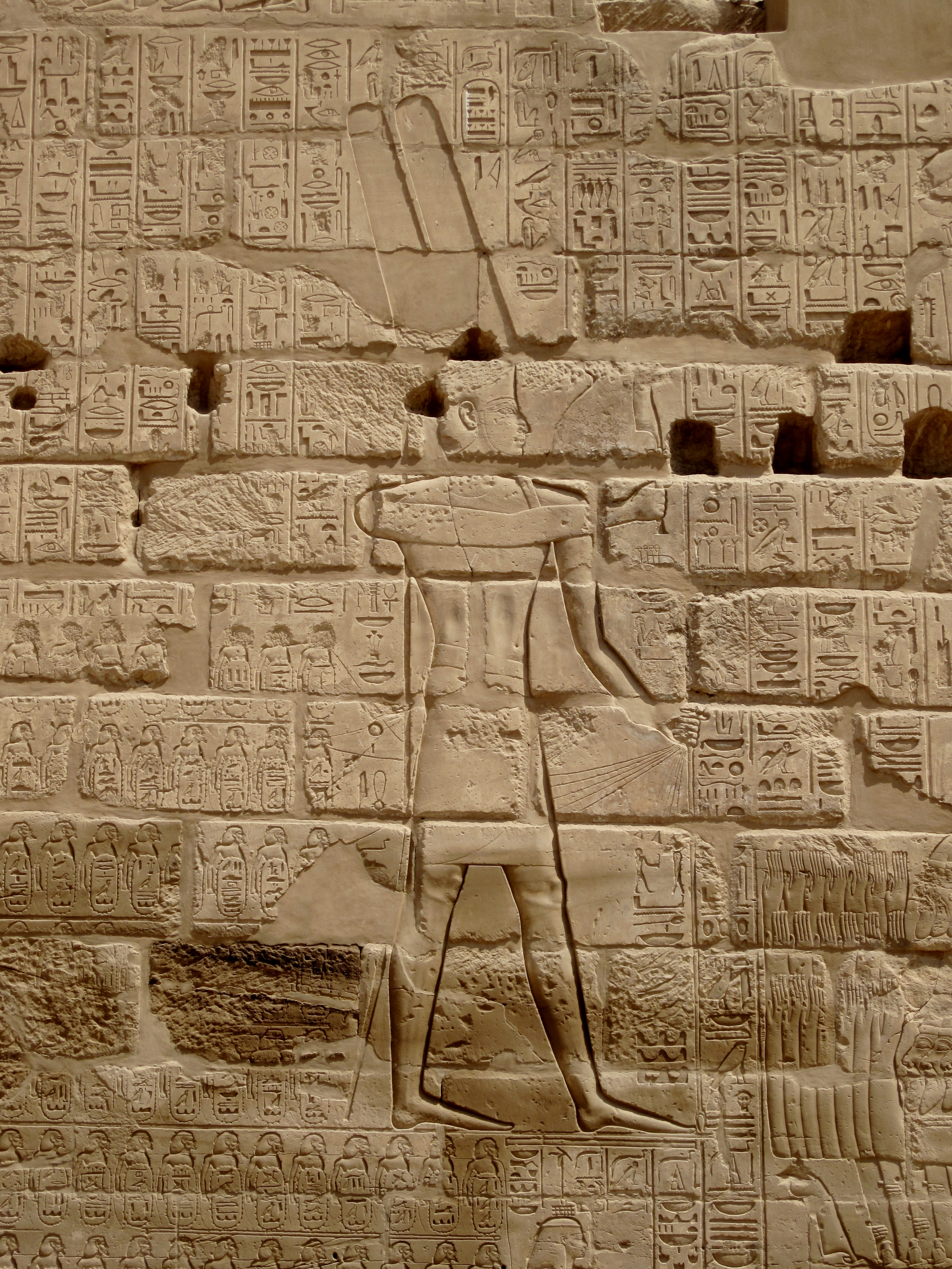
The Bubastite Portal at Karnak, depicting a list of city states conquered by Shoshenq I in his Near Eastern military campaigns. Jerusalem does not occur in the list.

Shishak, also spelled Shishaq or Susac (Hebrew: שִׁישַׁק, romanized: Šīšaq, Tiberian: [ʃiʃaq], Koine Greek: Σουσακίμ, romanized: Sousakim), was, according to the Hebrew Bible, a pharaoh of Egypt who sacked Jerusalem in the 10th century BC. He is usually identified with the pharaoh Shoshenq I.

He supported Jeroboam against Rehoboam of the Kingdom of Judah, and led a successful campaign through that country with a large army. Shishak did not destroy Jerusalem, but took the treasures of Solomon's Temple and the king's house. His campaign records, found in the Bubastite Portal at Karnak and a relief at el-Hibeh, list several conquered towns but fail to mention Jerusalem. The omission has sparked various theories, with some scholars questioning the historical accuracy of the Biblical account and others suggesting possible explanations for the omission. Shishak has also appeared in popular culture, notably in the film Raiders of the Lost Ark.

== Biblical narrative ==
Shishak's campaign against the Kingdom of Judah and his sack of Jerusalem are recounted in the Hebrew Bible, in 1 Kings 14:25 and 2 Chronicles 12:1–12. According to these accounts, Shishak had provided refuge to Jeroboam during the later years of Solomon's reign, and upon Solomon's death, Jeroboam became king of the tribes in the north, which separated from Judah to become the Kingdom of Israel. In the fifth year of Rehoboam's reign, commonly dated ca. 926 BC, Shishak swept through Judah with a powerful army of 60,000 horsemen and 1,200 chariots, in support of Jeroboam. According to 2 Chronicles 12:3, he was supported by the Lubim (Libyans), the Sukkiim, and the Kushites ("Ethiopians" in the Septuagint).

Shishak took away treasures of the Solomon's Temple and the king's house, as well as shields of gold which Solomon had made; Rehoboam replaced them with bronze ones.

According to Second Chronicles,

When Shishak king of Egypt attacked Jerusalem, he carried off the treasures of the temple of the Lord and the treasures of the royal palace. He took everything, including the gold shields Solomon had made.

— 2 Chronicles 12:9

Flavius Josephus in Antiquities of the Jews adds to this a contingent of 400,000 infantrymen. According to Josephus, his army met with no resistance throughout the campaign, taking Rehoboam's most fortified cities "without fighting". Finally, he conquered Jerusalem without resistance, because "Rehoboam was afraid." Shishak did not destroy Jerusalem, but forced King Rehoboam of Judah to strip the Temple and his treasury of their gold and movable treasures.

Shishak was also related by marriage to Jeroboam. The wife of Jeroboam is unnamed in the Masoretic Text, but according to the Septuagint, she was an Egyptian princess called Ano:

And Sousakim gave to Jeroboam Ano, the eldest sister of Thekemina his wife, to him as wife; she was great among the king's daughters...

== Identified as Pharaoh Shoshenq I ==
In the very early years after the decipherment of Egyptian hieroglyphs, on chronological, historical, and linguistic grounds, nearly all Egyptologists identified Shishak with Shoshenq I of the 22nd dynasty, who invaded Canaan following the Battle of Bitter Lakes. A common variant of Shoshenq's name omits its 'n' glyphs, resulting in a pronunciation like, "Shoshek". This position has been maintained by most scholars ever since, and remains the majority position today.

=== Campaign records ===
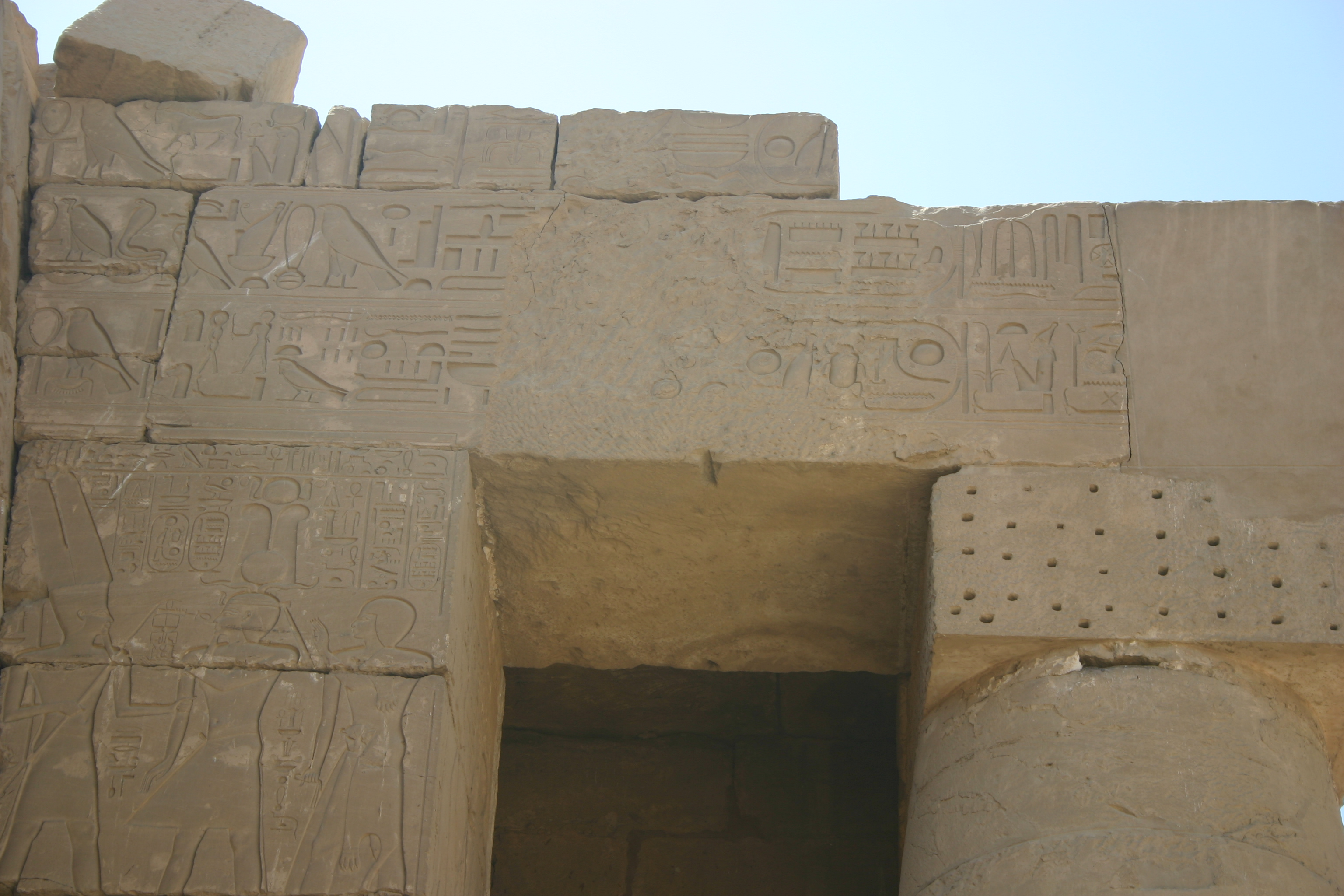
The Bubastite Portal at Karnak, showing the cartouches of Shoshenq I.

Shoshenq I left behind "explicit records of a campaign into Canaan (scenes; a long list of Canaanite place-names from the Negev to Galilee; stelae), including a stela [found] at Megiddo" which supports the traditional interpretation.

The Bubastite Portal, a relief discovered at Karnak, in Upper Egypt, and similar reliefs on the walls of a small temple of Amun at el-Hibeh, shows Pharaoh Shoshenq I holding in his hand a bound group of prisoners. The names of captured towns are located primarily in the territory of the kingdom of Israel (including Megiddo), with a few listed in the Negeb, and perhaps Philistia. Some of these include a few of the towns that Rehoboam had fortified according to Chronicles. However, the inscription makes no mention of Jerusalem itself, nor of Rehoboam or Jeroboam. Various explanations of this omission of Jerusalem have been proposed: its name may have been erased, the list may have been copied from an older pharaoh's list of conquests, or Rehoboam's ransoming the city (as described in the Second Book of Chronicles) would have saved it from being listed. Other scholars, notably Israel Finkelstein, doubt the historicity of the biblical narrative that Shoshenq conquered Jerusalem, arguing that Jerusalem was an insignificant settlement in the 10th century BC and that the biblical story was constructed by later Jerusalemite authors to promote the United Monarchy narrative.

=== Critical questions ===
It has been claimed that the numbers of Egyptian soldiers given in Chronicles can be "safely ignored as impossible" on Egyptological grounds; similarly, the numbers of chariots reported in 2 Chronicles is likely exaggerated by a factor of ten—leading 60,000 horses through the Sinai and Negev would have been logistically impossible, and no evidence of Egyptian cavalry exists from before the 27th Dynasty. Some authors, such as Israel Finkelstein, deem the treasures taken by Shishak as unlikely, alleging the material culture of 10th century Jerusalem and surroundings to have been too primitive to allow for any treasure that an Egyptian pharaoh would have been interested in. Finkelstein concludes that the looting narrative "should probably be seen as a theological construct rather than as historical references". By contrast, Krystal V. L. Pierce has pointed that a relief from Karnak records Sheshonq I presenting the tribute from his Levantine campaign to Amun-Re, and that the Pharaoh used the tribute to finance the construction of several monumental structures across Egypt.

== Fringe theories ==
Other identifications of Shishak have been put forward by chronological revisionists, arguing that Shoshenq's account does not match the Biblical account very closely, but these are considered fringe theories. In his book Ages in Chaos, Immanuel Velikovsky identified him with Thutmose III of the 18th dynasty. More recently, David Rohl's New Chronology identified him with Ramesses II of the 19th dynasty, and Peter James has identified him with Ramesses III of the 20th dynasty.

Commenting on Rohl's theory, Christopher Rollston argues that elsewhere in the Hebrew Bible the name Ramesses is consistenly written with the same consonants (Hebrew: רעמסס) and never rendered as "Shishak" (Hebrew: שִׁישַׁק). He also argues that "Shishak" is an unlikely rendering of a name of Ramesses II based on orthographic and phonological considerations.

== In popular culture ==
Shishak is mentioned in Steven Spielberg's action-adventure film Raiders of the Lost Ark as the pharaoh who seized the Ark of the Covenant from the Temple of Solomon during his raids on Jerusalem and hid it in the Well of Souls in Tanis.
