= Abijah =

Abijah (Hebrew: אֲבִיָּה Aviyyah) is a Biblical Hebrew unisex name which means "my Father is Yah". The Hebrew form Aviyahu also occurs in the Bible.

== Old Testament characters ==
=== Women ===
- Abijah, who married King Ahaz of Judah. She is also called Abi. Her father's name was Zechariah; she was the mother of King Hezekiah
- A wife of Hezron, one of the grandchildren of Judah

=== Men ===
- Abijah of Judah, also known as Abijam (אבים, Abiyam, "My Father is Yam [Sea]"), who was son of Rehoboam and succeeded him on the throne of Judah
- A son of Becher, the son of Benjamin
- The second son of Samuel. His conduct, along with that of his brother, as a judge in Beersheba, to which office his father had appointed him, led to popular discontent, and ultimately provoked the people to demand a monarchy.
- A descendant of Eleazar, the son of Aaron, a chief of the eighth of the twenty-four orders into which the priesthood was divided by David and an ancestor of Zechariah, the priest who was the father of John the Baptist. The order of Abijah is listed with the priests and Levites who returned with Zerubbabel son of Shealtiel and with Joshua.
- A son of Jeroboam, the first king of Israel. On account of his severe illness when a youth, his father sent his wife to consult the prophet Ahijah regarding his recovery. The prophet, though blind with old age, knew the wife of Jeroboam as soon as she approached, and under a divine impulse he announced to her that inasmuch as in Abijah alone of all the house of Jeroboam there was found "some good thing toward the Lord", he only would come to his grave in peace. As his mother crossed the threshold of the door on her return, the youth died, and "all Israel mourned for him". According to The Jewish Encyclopedia, the good that he did "Rabbinical Literature:The passage, I Kings, xiv. 13, in which there is a reference to "some good thing [found in him] toward the Lord God of Israel," is interpreted as an allusion to Abijah's courageous and pious act in removing the sentinels placed by his father on the frontier between Israel and Judah to prevent pilgrimages to Jerusalem. Some assert that he himself undertook a pilgrimage."
- This name (possibly) appeared on the Gezer calendar, a Paleo-Hebrew inscription dating to the 9th or 10th century BC, making it one of the earliest if not the earliest Yahwistic theophoric names outside the Bible.

== Russian name ==
The variant used in the Russian language is "А́вия" (Aviya), with "А́бия" or "Аби́я" (Abiya), being older forms. Included into various, often handwritten, church calendars throughout the 17th–19th centuries, it was omitted from the official Synodal Menologium at the end of the 19th century. In 1924–1930, the name (as "Ави́я", a form of "Abiya") was included into various Soviet calendars, which included the new and often artificially created names promoting the new Soviet realities and encouraging the break with the tradition of using the names in the Synodal Menologia. In Russian it is only used as a female name. Diminutives of this name include "А́ва" (Ava) and "Ви́я" (Viya).
