= Battle of Bitter Lakes =

925 BCE battle

- Part of Jeroboam's Revolt
Date	925 BC
Location	Bitter Lakes
Result	Egyptian victory

Belligerents
Egypt	Nomads

Commanders and leaders
Shoshenq I	Unknown

Strength
Unknown	Unknown

Casualties and losses
Unknown	Many killed

The Battle of Bitter Lakes was a part of the military campaign of Shoshenq I into Asia in 925 BCE where he conquered many cities and towns. The location of the conflict was at Bitter Lakes, that we can identify with the lakes to the north by the frontier channel that was developed in part to guard the eastern border of Lower Egypt, although it is not certain that the channel reached that far south. The fortresses at the boundary served as checkpoints for Asiatics who attempted to enter Egypt. This would also serve to block the attacks such as this one mentioned in a stele of Shoshenq I in Karnak.

== Battle ==
The battle began as a result of a border incursion by nomads. According to some scholars, Shoshenq used these forays as an excuse to launch an invasion to Judah. Paul Ash suggests that they may have been marauding nomads in the area of the shores of the Bitter Lakes, in Lower Egypt. The pharaoh was followed by his royal scribe Hori, and chariotry, to the battlefield. Not much is known about the actual battle besides the fact that Shoshenq won after surprising the enemy at the shores of Bitter Lakes.

== Records of the battle ==
Previously mentioned stele of Shoshenq I, discovered at Karnak (specifically the Great Karnak Inscription in Hall K), mentions this much about the battle:

Now, My Majesty found that [ ... they] were killing [ ... ] army-leaders. His Majesty was upset about them Š [His Majesty went forth,] his chariotry accompanying him without (the enemy's) knowing it. His Majesty made great slaughter among them, Š at the edge of the Bitter Lakes.

A contemporary, Hori, had been a real royal scribe, [following] the king at his incursions into the foreign lands

The additional details include a list of the cities (or nearby locations) Shoshenq's armies invaded, including Taanach, Esdraelon, Aijalon, Megiddo, Zemaraim, Bethel, and Tirzah. A Shoshenq stela in Megiddo may also attest to this incursion.

== Biblical Shishak ==
Sheshonk I is frequently identified with the Egyptian king "Shishaq" (שׁישׁק Šîšaq, transliterated), who, according to the Books of Kings, invaded Judah in the time of king Rehoboam. The biblical record in 1 Kings 14 and 2 Chronicles 12 deal with Jerusalem's perspective on the attack, but the record of Sheshonk I gives greater detail of other battle grounds.

== See also ==
- Retjenu
- Shasu
- Twenty-second dynasty of Egypt
