= Jeroboam's wife =

Character in the Hebrew bible

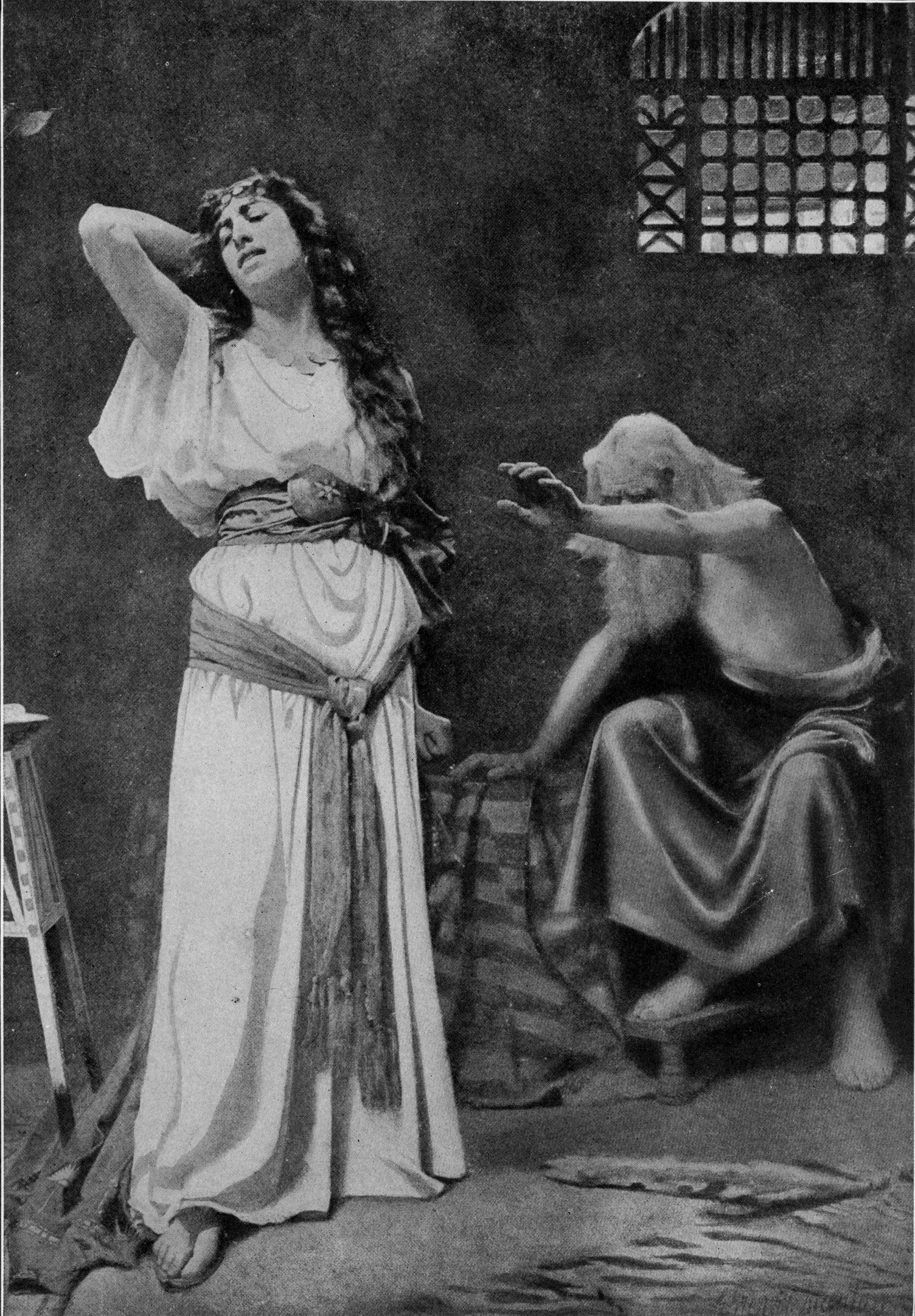
Depiction of Ahijah and Jeroboam's wife, by Charles Horne, 1909.

Jeroboam's wife is a character in the Hebrew Bible. She is unnamed in the Masoretic Text, but according to the Septuagint, she was an Egyptian princess called Ano:

And Sousakim gave to Jeroboam Ano the eldest sister of Thekemina his wife, to him as wife; she was great among the king's daughters...

She is mentioned in 1 Kings 14, which describes how she visited the prophet Ahijah the Shilonite. Her son Abijah was sick, and on her husband Jeroboam's instructions she disguised herself and went to Ahijah. Although Ahijah was blind, God had told him that she was coming and had given him a message for her. This included the death of her son, who was to die as soon as Jeroboam's wife came back home to Tirzah. He would be the only one of Jeroboam's offspring who would be buried, "because something good was found in him, to Yhwh the God of Israel". According to 1 Kings 14:17, her son died as soon as she stepped over the threshold.

In the Septuagint, the story is found in I Kings 12 after verse 24, and differs somewhat from the Masoretic text.

According to the Jewish Encyclopedia the good that Abijah did: "Rabbinical Literature:The passage, I Kings, xiv. 13, in which there is a reference to "some good thing [found in him] toward the Lord God of Israel," is interpreted (M. Ḳ. 28b) as an allusion to Abijah's courageous and pious act in removing the sentinels placed by his father on the frontier between Israel and Judah to prevent pilgrimages to Jerusalem. Some assert that he himself undertook a pilgrimage."

The wife of Jeroboam does not speak at all in the biblical narrative. Robin Gallaher Branch calls her "flat, vapid, and overwhelmingly sad", while Adele Berlin says that she is "intentionally not portrayed as a real individual in her own right", but that her characterization should be viewed as "the effective use of an anonymous character to fill an important literary function".

Branch also argues that Jeroboam's wife was abused by her husband.
