= 1 Kings 13 =

1 Kings, chapter 13

- ← chapter 12 chapter 14 →
- The pages containing the Books of Kings (1 & 2 Kings) Leningrad Codex (1008 CE).
- Book: First book of Kings
- Hebrew Bible part: Nevi'im
- Order in the Hebrew part: 4
- Category: Former Prophets
- Christian Bible part: Old Testament
- Order in the Christian part: 11

1 Kings 13 is the thirteenth chapter of the Books of Kings in the Hebrew Bible or the First Book of Kings in the Old Testament of the Christian Bible. The book is a compilation of various annals recording the acts of the kings of Israel and Judah by a Deuteronomic compiler in the seventh century BCE, with a supplement added in the sixth century BCE. 1 Kings 12:1 to 16:14 documents the consolidation of the kingdoms of northern Israel and Judah: this chapter focusses on the reign of Jeroboam in the northern kingdom.

== Text ==
This chapter was originally written in the Hebrew language and since the 16th century is divided into 34 verses.

=== Textual witnesses ===
Some early manuscripts containing the text of this chapter in Hebrew are of the Masoretic Text tradition, which includes the Codex Cairensis (895), Aleppo Codex (10th century), and Codex Leningradensis (1008).

There is also a translation into Koine Greek known as the Septuagint, made in the last few centuries BCE. Extant ancient manuscripts of the Septuagint version include Codex Vaticanus (B; $\mathfrak{G}$^{B}; 4th century) and Codex Alexandrinus (A; $\mathfrak{G}$^{A}; 5th century). (Note: The whole book of 1 Kings is missing from the extant Codex Sinaiticus.)

=== Old Testament references ===
- 1 Kings 13:1–10: 2 Kings 23:4–20; 2 Chronicles 34:3–7

== Jeroboam’s hand withers (13:1–10) ==
Jeroboam's 'illegitimate cult activities' at the 'illegitimate holy site' of Bethel was exposed by a prophet from Judah who was loyal to YHWH and demonstrated that the miraculous power of God was superior to a king. The conflict in Bethel may lead to the story of prophet Amos' appearance in Bethel (cf. Amos 7:10–17). The anonymous prophet foretold the end of Jeroboam's dynasty and the northern kingdom, that only the 'house of David' would remain to take action against the high places in Bethel (cf. Josiah's actions in 2 Kings 22:1–23:10). The broken altar provided a sign that the prophecy is true, whereas Jeroboam's withered hand showed the impotence of the king against the prophetic word.

=== Verse 2 ===
And the man cried against the altar by the word of the Lord and said, "O altar, altar, thus says the Lord: 'Behold, a son shall be born to the house of David, Josiah by name, and he shall sacrifice on you the priests of the high places who make offerings on you, and human bones shall be burned on you.'"

- "Josiah": the sixteenth king of Judah who launch a "Deuteronomic reform" to remove high places in northern and southern territories of Israel during his reign (c. 640–609 BCE). There is an interval of about 330 years between the accession of Jeroboam and the accession of Josiah, so the mention of Josiah who would fulfill the prophecy of vengeance is remarkable among the predictions of the Old Testament (such as the prophecy concerning Cyrus in Isaiah 44:28; Isaiah 45:1), so some have speculated that this verse as well as other parts of the story of this chapter were compiled into their present form at a later date than Jeroboam.

== The old prophet and the man of God (13:11–34) ==
The second narrative of the chapter deals with the meeting between two prophets to address the question "who can decide who is right when two prophets speak, claiming God's authority, yet contradict each other?" (cf. 1 Kings 22 and Jeremiah 27–28). In the story, the 'true' prophet allowed himself to be deceived by the 'false' prophet and paid for it with his life, so that his death convinced skeptics of the 'true' prophet's relationship to God. As the previous passage, the focus of the story was 'the holy site in Bethel and its altar', both of which were contaminated by 'Jeroboam's sin': the prophet's word immediately destroyed the altar (verses 3, 5) and the holy site would be abolished 300 years later by King Josiah (2 Kings 23:15–18), while the common grave of both prophets was preserved. Another point of the story is that God requires 'complete and radical obedience' to what he has commanded, not to be swayed by another's claim that God had spoken through the other person.

=== Verses 31–32 ===
^{31} And after he had buried him, he said to his sons, "When I am dead, bury me in the grave in which the man of God is buried; lay my bones beside his bones.
^{32} For the saying that he cried out by the word of the Lord against the altar in Bethel and against all the houses of the high places that are in the cities of Samaria shall surely come to pass."

- "Samaria": Israel's future capital city here which was built and named several years after this event (1 Kings 16:24); here stands for the northern kingdom as a whole. It is likely that the author of Kings, writing at a later time, is adapting the old prophet's original statement to the contemporary geography.

== See also ==
- David
- Idolatry
- Israel
- Jerusalem
- Kingdom of Judah
- Kohen
- Prophet
- Related Bible parts: 1 Kings 12, 1 Kings 16, 2 Kings 22, 2 Kings 23, 2 Chronicles 34

== Sources ==
- Collins, John J. (2014). "Chapter 14: 1 Kings 12 – 2 Kings 25". Introduction to the Hebrew Scriptures. Fortress Press. pp. 277–296. ISBN 978-1451469233.
- Coogan, Michael David (2007). Coogan, Michael David; Brettler, Marc Zvi; Newsom, Carol Ann; Perkins, Pheme (eds.). The New Oxford Annotated Bible with the Apocryphal/Deuterocanonical Books: New Revised Standard Version, Issue 48 (Augmented 3rd ed.). Oxford University Press. ISBN 978-0195288810.
- Dietrich, Walter (2007). "13. 1 and 2 Kings". In Barton, John; Muddiman, John (eds.). The Oxford Bible Commentary (first (paperback) ed.). Oxford University Press. pp. 232–266. ISBN 978-0199277186.
- Halley, Henry H. (1965). Halley's Bible Handbook: an abbreviated Bible commentary (24th (revised) ed.). Zondervan Publishing House. ISBN 0-310-25720-4.
- Hayes, Christine (2015). Introduction to the Bible. Yale University Press. ISBN 978-0300188271.
- Leithart, Peter J. (2006). 1 & 2 Kings. Brazos Theological Commentary on the Bible. Brazos Press. ISBN 978-1587431258.
- McKane, William (1993). "Kings, Book of". In Metzger, Bruce M; Coogan, Michael D (eds.). The Oxford Companion to the Bible. Oxford University Press. pp. 409–413. ISBN 978-0195046458.
- Metzger, Bruce M; Coogan, Michael D, eds. (1993). The Oxford Companion to the Bible. Oxford University Press. ISBN 978-0195046458.
- Thiele, Edwin R. (1983). The Mysterious Numbers of the Hebrew Kings (3rd ed.). Grand Rapids, Michigan: Zondervan. ISBN 978-0-310-36010-0.
- Würthwein, Ernst (1995). The Text of the Old Testament. Translated by Rhodes, Erroll F. Grand Rapids, MI: Wm. B. Eerdmans. ISBN 0-8028-0788-7.
