= Zeruah =

Biblical figure

Zeruah (Hebrew: צְרוּעָה Ṣərūʿā, "leper" or "wasp") was an ancestor of Jeroboam, the first king of the Kingdom of Israel. She is mentioned only in a single verse of the Hebrew Bible, and her relationship to Jeroboam depends on how one interprets the text, with Zeruah being either the mother of Jeroboam, or the mother of Jeroboam's father, Nebat:

"And Jeroboam the son of Nebat, an Ephraimite of Zeredah, a servant of Solomon, whose mother’s name was Zeruah, a widow, he also lifted up his hand against the king" (1 Kings 11:26, American Standard Version).
