= Zaham =

In the Hebrew Bible, Zaham, meaning "loathing", was the son of Rehoboam, king of Judah, and Mahalath. He was a grandson of Solomon.

2 Chronicles 11:19 notes that all of Rehoboam's sons were appointed to positions within the fortified cities of the kingdom.
