= 1 Kings 12 =

1 Kings, chapter 12

- ← chapter 11 chapter 13 →
- The pages containing the Books of Kings (1 & 2 Kings) Leningrad Codex (1008 CE).
- Book: First book of Kings
- Hebrew Bible part: Nevi'im
- Order in the Hebrew part: 4
- Category: Former Prophets
- Christian Bible part: Old Testament
- Order in the Christian part: 11

1 Kings 12 is the twelfth chapter of the Books of Kings in the Hebrew Bible or the First Book of Kings in the Old Testament of the Christian Bible. The book is a compilation of various annals recording the acts of the kings of Israel and Judah by a Deuteronomic compiler in the seventh century BCE, with a supplement added in the sixth century BCE. 1 Kings 12:1 to 16:14 documents the consolidation of the kingdoms of northern Israel and Judah: this chapter focusses on the reigns of Rehoboam and Jeroboam.

== Text ==
This chapter was originally written in the Hebrew language and since the 16th century is divided into 33 verses.

=== Textual witnesses ===
Some early manuscripts containing the text of this chapter in Hebrew are of the Masoretic Text tradition, which includes the Codex Cairensis (895), Aleppo Codex (10th century), and Codex Leningradensis (1008). Fragments containing parts of this chapter in Hebrew were found among the Dead Sea Scrolls, that is, 6Q4 (6QpapKgs; 150–75 BCE) with extant verses 28–31.

There is also a translation into Koine Greek known as the Septuagint, made in the last few centuries BCE. Extant ancient manuscripts of the Septuagint version include Codex Vaticanus (B; $\mathfrak{G}$^{B}; 4th century) and Codex Alexandrinus (A; $\mathfrak{G}$^{A}; 5th century). (Note: The whole book of 1 Kings is missing from the extant Codex Sinaiticus.)

=== Old Testament references ===
- 1 Kings 12:41–43: 2 Chronicles 9:29–31

== Negotiations in Shechem (12:1–20) ==
Rehoboam took the throne in Judah without opposition, but he required confirmation from the northern kingdom (cf 1 Samuel 10:24–25; 2 Samuel 5:3; 19:10-11,42-4). After Solomon's death, the northern tribes of Israel requested negotiations with the new king in Shechem (today: Nablus, in the central mountain country of Ephraim) and when the early negotiation failed, Jeroboam was called upon to lead the petition to reduce the financial burdens imposed by Solomon (verse 20). Rehoboam seeks advice from 'the older men who had attended his father Solomon' and with 'the young men who had grown up with him and now attended him' (verses 6, 8), representing a political conflict between two generations. The 'undiplomatic arrogance' of Rehoboam's reply based on the advice of the younger advisors (using vulgarity) triggered what already perceived by the northern tribes that Solomon and his family intended to squeeze the northern Israel hard, in comparison to the tribe of Judah, so the northern tribes decided to separate (verse 16 uses a language of separation almost identical to 2 Samuel 20:1, when the northern tribes had privately distanced themselves from Davidic rule during Absalom's failed revolt). Despite the acknowledgment that things happened exactly as the prophet Ahijah of Shiloh had forecast (verse 15, cf. 1 Kings 11:29–32), the author of this passage still regards the separation as a 'perverse rebellion against the legitimate reign of the descendants of David' (verse 19).

=== Verse 18 ===
Then king Rehoboam sent Adoram, who was over the tribute; and all Israel stoned him with stones, that he died. Therefore king Rehoboam made speed to get him up to his chariot, to flee to Jerusalem.

- "Adoram": Old Greek translation and Syriac Peshitta have "Adoniram." (cf. 1 Kings 4:6). He was the tax collector in the United Kingdom of Israel for over forty years, from the late years of King David's reign (2 Samuel 20:24) until the early reign of Rehoboam (this verse), and was responsible "over the tribute", that is, the levy or forced labor, and in charge of conscripted timber cutters during the building of King Solomon's temple (1 Kings 5:13,14).

== Civil war averted (12:21–24) ==
The separation of northern tribes happened as prophesied by the prophet Ahijah of Shiloh as a (limited) divine judgement upon the ruling house of Jerusalem (1 Kings 11:29–39), and confirmed by the prophet Shemaiah in this passage that Rehoboam and the Judeans should not go against God's irreversible decision, especially when it means fighting against their 'kindred'.

== State worship in Bethel and Dan (12:25–33) ==
The record of Jeroboam I of Israel spans from 1 Kings 12:25 to 14:24, but in the Septuagint version of Codex Vaticanus there is an addition before verse 25, numbered as 24a to 24z, which is not present in the Hebrew Bible, but this Greek text often concurs literally with the Hebrew text in 1 Kings 11–14 although containing some significant differences, such as:

1. Jeroboam was a son of Sarira, a harlot.
2. Jeroboam, while serving a commander of a chariot unit during Solomon's reign, laid claim to the entire kingdom, so Solomon sought to kill him, but Jeroboam escaped to Egypt (verse 24b).
3. After returning from exile in Egypt, Jeroboam waited in his home town Zereda (or "Sarira") and fortified the city, where his wife Anot (the sister of Pharaoh Shishak's wife) was told by the prophet Ahijah about the sickness and death of Abijah, her son (verses 24g–24n, cf. 1 Kings 14:1–18 in Hebrew Bible).
4. Jeroboam was promised ten of the twelve tribes (verse 24o) in Shechem by the prophet Shemaiah (not by Ahijah near Jerusalem, as in 1 Kings 11:29–31 in Hebrew Bible).
5. After the failure of negotiations with Rehoboam (verses 24p–24s; more detailed in 1 Kings 12:3–14 in Hebrew Bible) and the looming civil war (cf. 1 Kings 12:21–24), the compromise settlement gave Jeroboam ten tribes and Rehoboam two (verses 24t–24z).

Also, in Greek text, Rehoboam was made king at 16 years of age (Hebrew text: 40 years old), and reigned 12 years (Hebrew text: 17 years); his mother was Naanan (Hebrew text: Naamah), the daughter of Ana, son of Nahash, king of Ammon.

Jeroboam became the founder and quasi-democratically legitimized ruler of northern Israel (1 Kings 12:20), but he was always afraid to be dethroned by the same constituents when they still remember the Davidic rule (verses 26–27), so he initiated a number of building projects (imitating Solomon), such as castles in the cis-Jordanian Shechem and in trans-Jordanian Penuel (verse 25); cf. 1 Samuel 11), — (as the central city of the original Israelite region of Gilead, cf. 1 Samuel 11) and state holy sites in Dan (far north) and Bethel (deep in the south of his kingdom), at the sites of long existed worship places (cf. Judges 17–18; Genesis 28; 35). Jeroboam's statue of 'calves' more closely resembled those of (young) bulls, the animal symbolizing Canaan's main gods El and Baal, but he claimed to worship the Israelite YHWH 'who brought you up out of the land of Egypt' (verse 28), as also evidenced in the archaeological excavations in Tel-Dan, the site of ancient city of Dan, where the seal impressions with Yahwistic names, the architecture of the high place, the artifacts, and the animal bones for sacrifices to YHWH. Nonetheless, this is not in accordance to the main belief that God's temple resides in Zion (Jerusalem), so Jeroboam's policy was severely criticized and interpreted as 'the seed of the fall of his dynasty and also the kingdom he founded' (cf. 12:29; 13:33–34; as the links of all northern kings' wickedness to 'the sins of Jeroboam'), in particular, the establishment of holy high places (cf. verse 31 with Leviticus 26:30; Deuteronomy 12; 2 Kings 17:9–10), the appointment of non-Levite priests (cf. verse 31 with Deuteronomy 18:1-8), and the unauthorized introduction of a religious feast (cf. verse 32 with Leviticus 23:34).

=== Verses 28–29 ===
^{28}So the king took counsel and made two calves of gold. And he said to the people, "You have gone up to Jerusalem long enough. Behold your gods, O Israel, who brought you up out of the land of Egypt."
^{29} And he set one in Bethel, and the other he put in Dan.

- "Dan": Archaeological excavation in the site of ancient city Dan has revealed the high place and location of the golden calf statue.

== See also ==
- Adoniram
- Ahijah the Shilonite
- David
- Idolatry
- Israel
- Jerusalem
- Jesse
- Kingdom of Judah
- Kohen
- Mount Ephraim
- Penuel
- Solomon
- Related Bible parts: Leviticus 23, Deuteronomy 12, Judges 17, Judges 18, 1 Samuel 15, 2 Samuel 11, 1 Kings 5, 1 Kings 6, 1 Kings 7, 1 Kings 9, 2 Kings 17, 2 Chronicles 9

== Sources ==
- Collins, John J. (2014). "Chapter 14: 1 Kings 12 – 2 Kings 25". Introduction to the Hebrew Scriptures. Fortress Press. pp. 277–296. ISBN 978-1451469233.
- Coogan, Michael David (2007). Coogan, Michael David; Brettler, Marc Zvi; Newsom, Carol Ann; Perkins, Pheme (eds.). The New Oxford Annotated Bible with the Apocryphal/Deuterocanonical Books: New Revised Standard Version, Issue 48 (Augmented 3rd ed.). Oxford University Press. ISBN 978-0195288810.
- Dietrich, Walter (2007). "13. 1 and 2 Kings". In Barton, John; Muddiman, John (eds.). The Oxford Bible Commentary (first (paperback) ed.). Oxford University Press. pp. 232–266. ISBN 978-0199277186.
- Fitzmyer, Joseph A. (2008). A Guide to the Dead Sea Scrolls and Related Literature. Grand Rapids, MI: William B. Eerdmans Publishing Company. ISBN 9780802862419.
- Halley, Henry H. (1965). Halley's Bible Handbook: an abbreviated Bible commentary (24th (revised) ed.). Zondervan Publishing House. ISBN 0-310-25720-4.
- Hayes, Christine (2015). Introduction to the Bible. Yale University Press. ISBN 978-0300188271.
- Leithart, Peter J. (2006). 1 & 2 Kings. Brazos Theological Commentary on the Bible. Brazos Press. ISBN 978-1587431258.
- McKane, William (1993). "Kings, Book of". In Metzger, Bruce M; Coogan, Michael D (eds.). The Oxford Companion to the Bible. Oxford University Press. pp. 409–413. ISBN 978-0195046458.
- Metzger, Bruce M; Coogan, Michael D, eds. (1993). The Oxford Companion to the Bible. Oxford University Press. ISBN 978-0195046458.
- Ulrich, Eugene, ed. (2010). The Biblical Qumran Scrolls: Transcriptions and Textual Variants. Brill.
- Würthwein, Ernst (1995). The Text of the Old Testament. Translated by Rhodes, Erroll F. Grand Rapids, MI: Wm. B. Eerdmans. ISBN 0-8028-0788-7.
