= Rehoboam =

Biblical figure; first monarch of the Kingdom of Judah

Rehoboam רְחַבְעָם
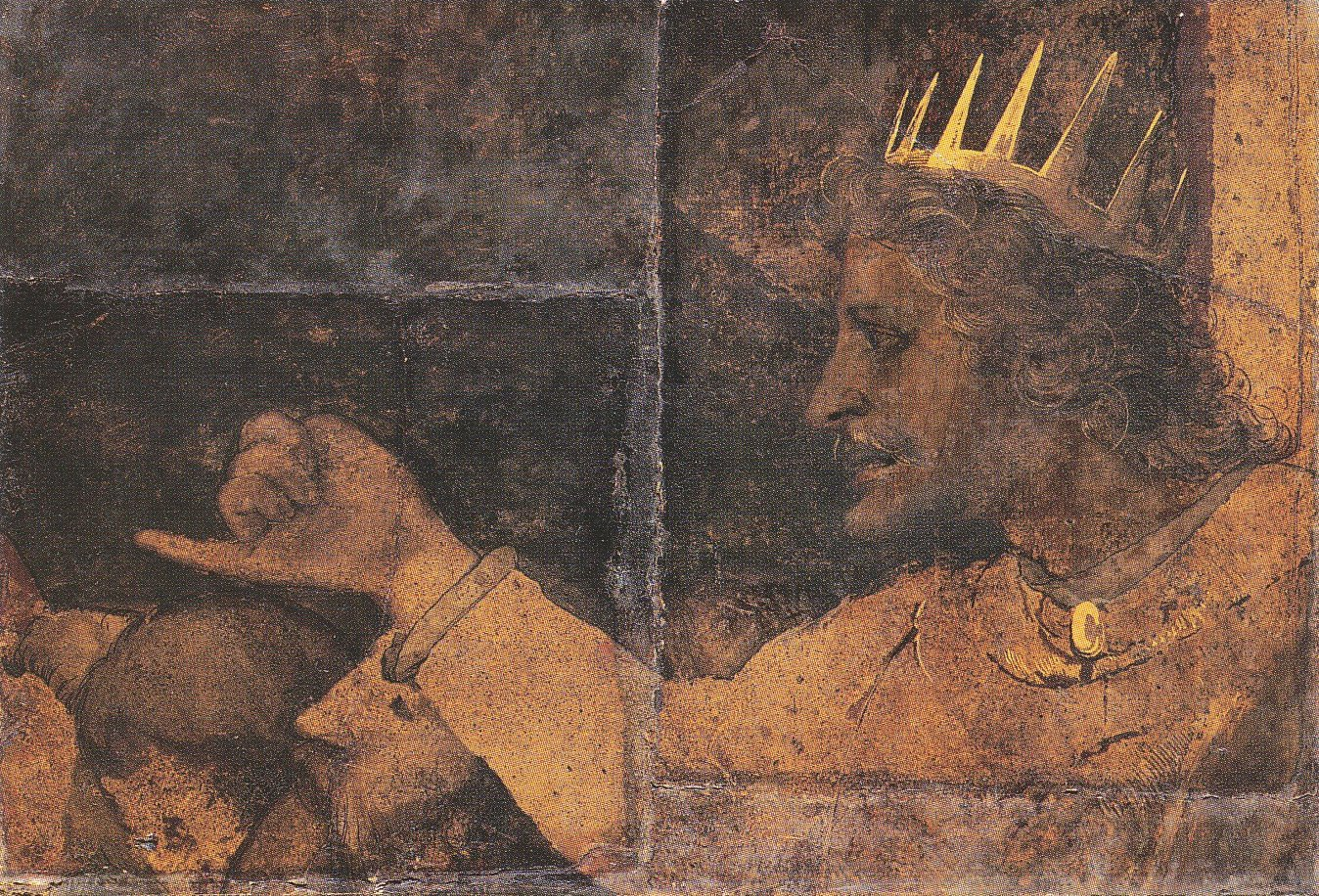
- Rehoboam, on a fragment of a mural by Hans Holbein the Younger kept at the Kunstmuseum Basel in Switzerland

King of Israel
- Reign: c. 931 BCE
- Predecessor: Solomon
- Successor: Position abolished (succeeded by Jeroboam as king of the northern kingdom)

King of Judah
- Reign: c. 931–913 BCE
- Successor: Abijah
- Born: c. 972 BCE
- Died: c. 913 BCE
- Spouse: Mahalath; Maacah; Abihail; 16 other wives; 60 concubines
- Issue: Jeush; Shemariah; Zaham; 60 daughters
- House: House of David
- Father: Solomon
- Mother: Naamah

Rehoboam (/ˌriːəˈboʊ.əm/; Hebrew: רְחַבְעָם, Rəḥaḇʿām, transl. "an enlarged people"; Greek: Ροβοάμ, Roboam; Latin: Roboam) was, according to the Hebrew Bible, the last monarch of the United Kingdom of Israel, though his reign over the unified state was brief; after the Northern and Southern kingdoms were divided, he became the first king of the Kingdom of Judah. He was a son of and the successor to Solomon and a grandson of David.

In the account of I Kings and II Chronicles, Rehoboam saw his rule limited to only the Kingdom of Judah in the south following a rebellion by the ten northern tribes of Israel in 932/931 BCE, which led to the formation of the independent Kingdom of Israel under the rule of Jeroboam in the north.

Extrabiblical evidence for Judah’s stability under Rehoboam is limited, with indications that the biblical accounts of Rehoboam and Jeroboam may be retrojections.

== Background ==
According to the Jewish Encyclopedia, "Solomon's wisdom and power were not sufficient to prevent the rebellion of several of his border cities. Damascus under Rezon secured its independence [from] Solomon; and Jeroboam, a superintendent of works, his ambition stirred by the words of the prophet Ahijah, fled to Egypt. Thus, before the death of Solomon, the apparently unified kingdom of David began to disintegrate. With Damascus independent and a powerful man of Ephraim, the most prominent of the Ten Tribes, awaiting his opportunity, the future of Solomon's kingdom became dubious".

According to First Book of Kings 11:1–13, Solomon had broken the mandate of the Torah by marrying foreign wives and being influenced by them, worshipping and building shrines to the Moabite and Ammonite gods:

So the Lord became angry with Solomon because his heart had turned from the Lord God of Israel ... Therefore the Lord said to Solomon, "Because you have done this, and have not kept My covenant and My statutes, which I have commanded you, I will surely tear the kingdom away from you and give it to your servant. Nevertheless, I will not do it in your days, for the sake of your father David; I will tear it out of the hand of your son."

— 1 Kings 11:1–13

Rehoboam's mother, Naamah, was an Ammonite, and thus one of the foreign wives whom Solomon married. In the Revised Version of the Bible she is referred to as "the Ammonitess".

== Reign ==
=== Accession to the throne ===
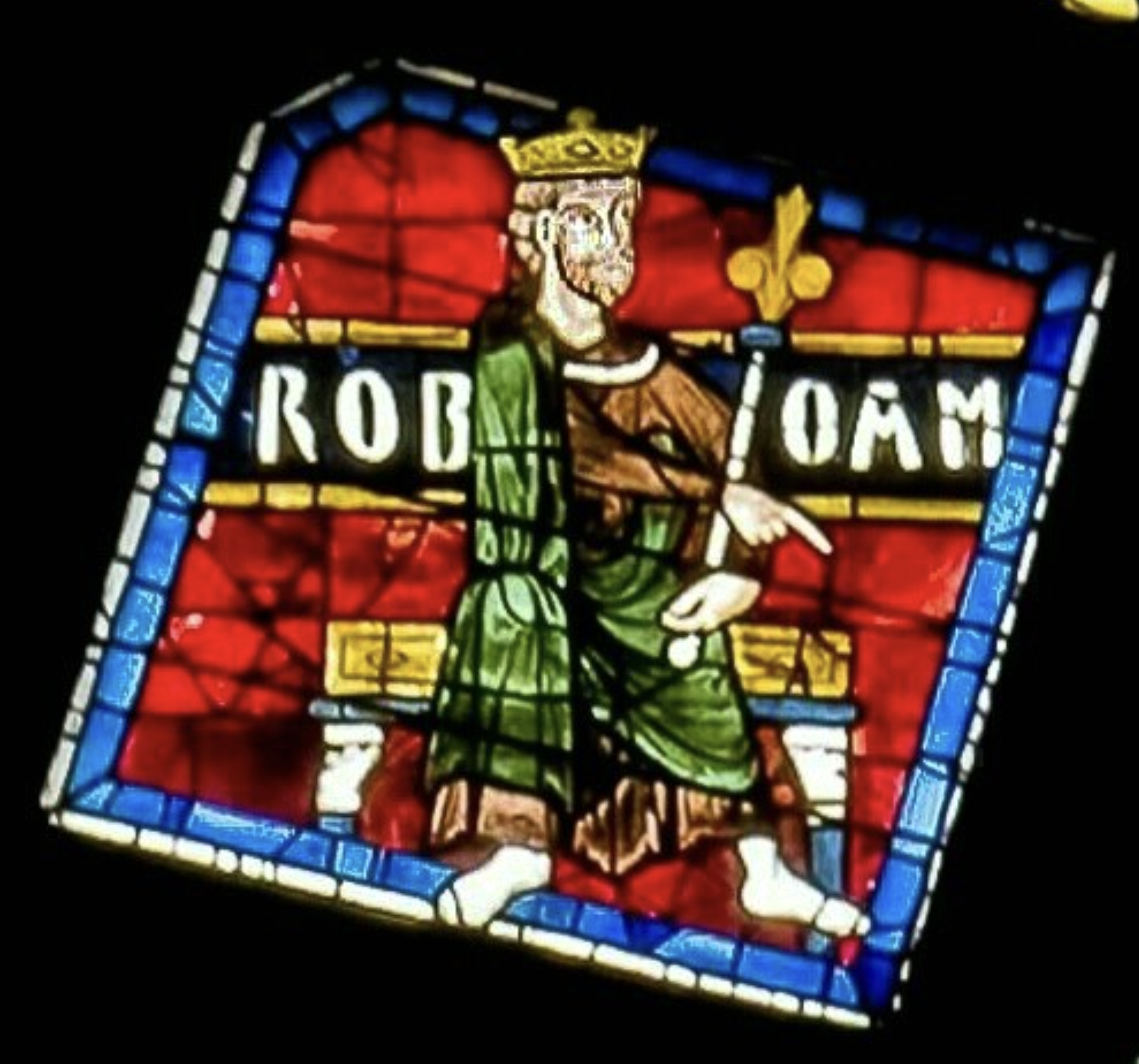
King Rehoboam, from the north rose window of Chartres Cathedral

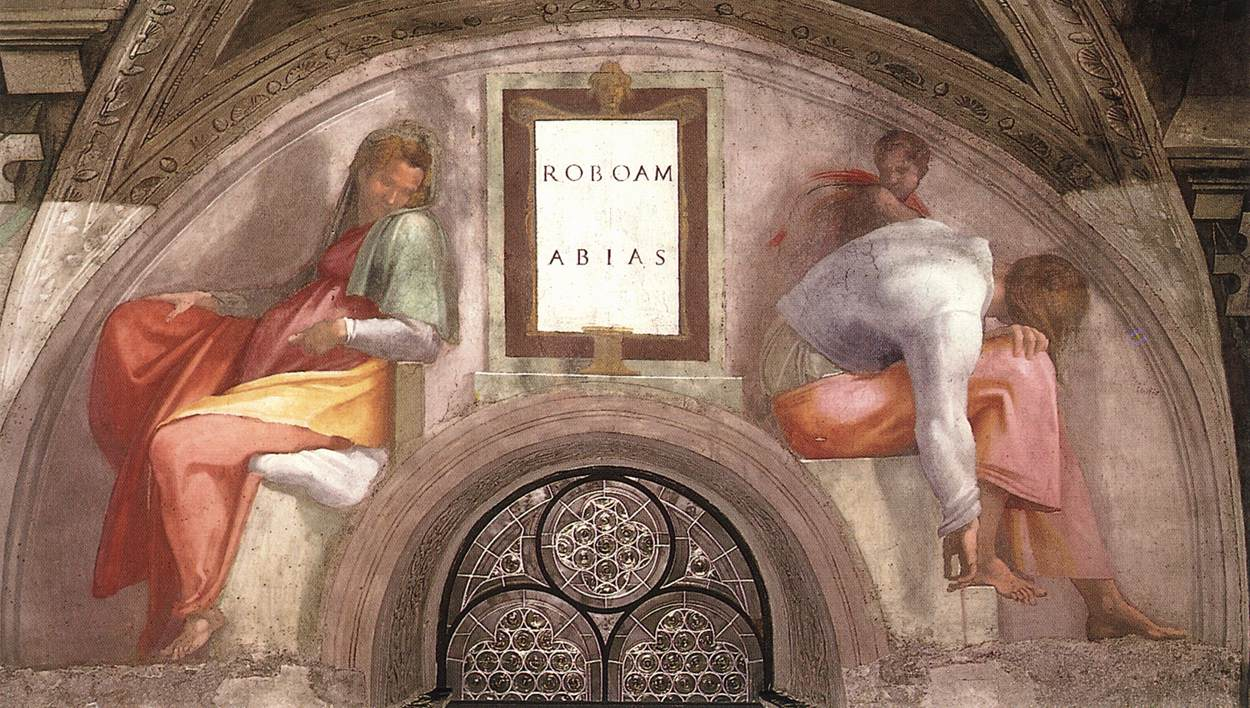
Rehoboam and Abijah, from the Sistine Chapel ceiling.

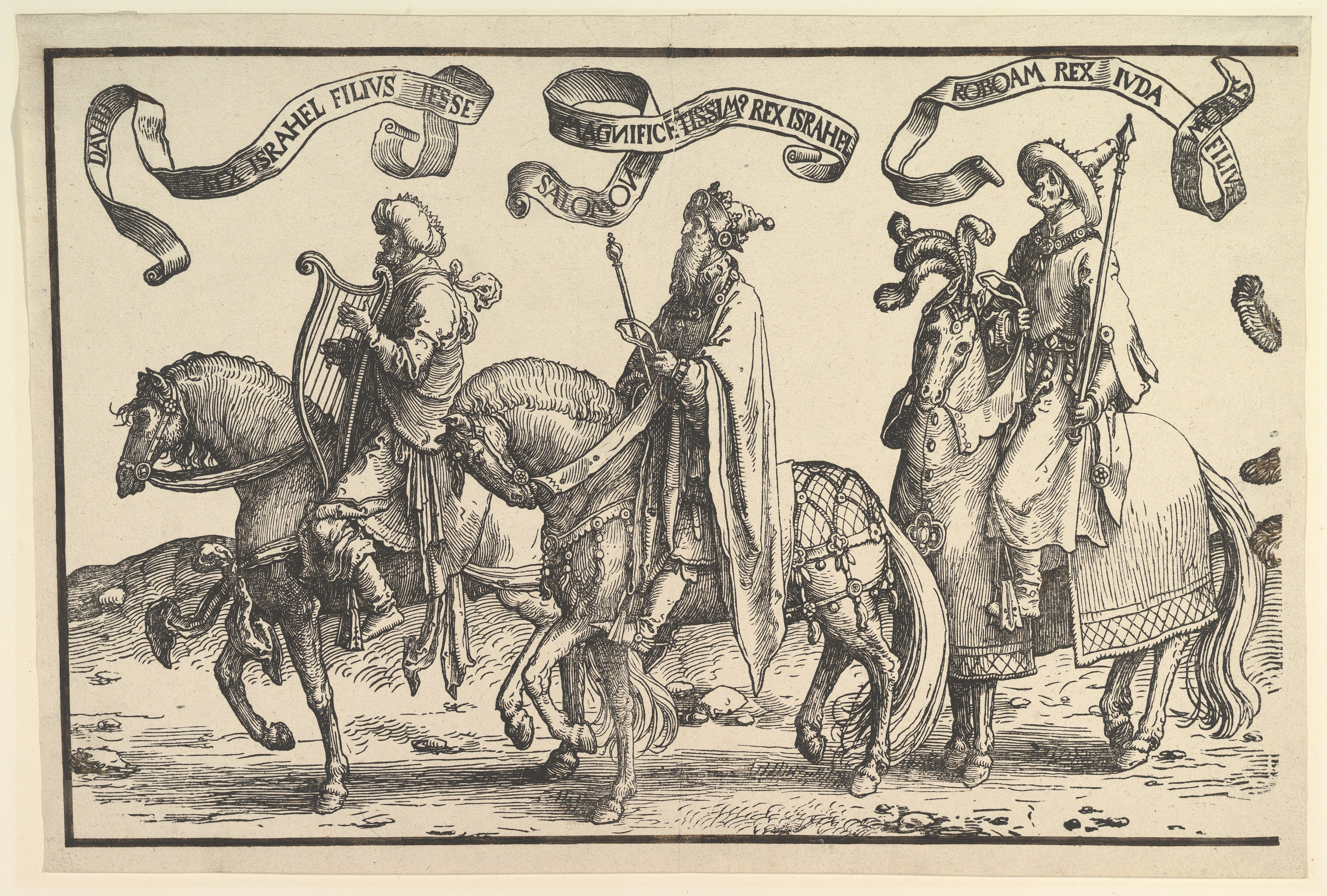
David, Solomon, and Rehoboam, by Lucas van Leyden

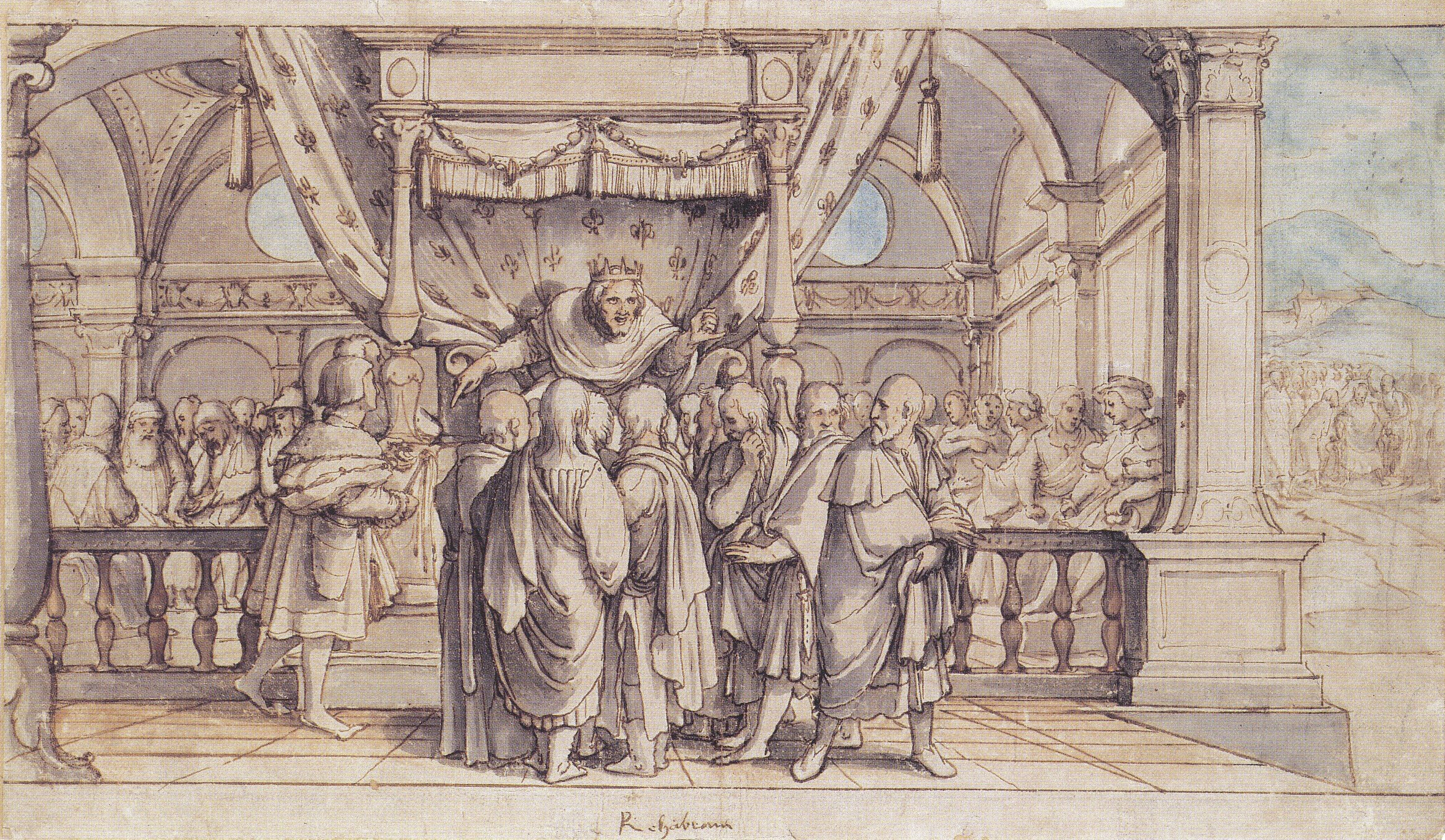
The Arrogance of Rehoboam, drawing by Hans Holbein the Younger

Conventional biblical chronology dates the start of Rehoboam's reign to the mid-10th century BC. His reign is described in 1 Kings 12 and 1 Kings 14:21–31 and in 2 Chronicles in the Hebrew Bible. Rehoboam was 41 years old (16 in Chapter 12 of 3 Kings in the Septuagint) when he ascended the throne.

The ten northern tribes assembled at Shechem to proclaim Rehoboam King of Israel. At the assembly, the tribes requested certain reforms in the policy followed by Rehoboam's father, Solomon. The reforms requested would materially reduce the royal exchequer and hence its power to continue the magnificence of Solomon's court. The older men counselled Rehoboam at least to speak to the people in a civil manner (it is not clear whether they counselled him to accept the demands). However, the new king sought the advice from the young men with which he had grown up, who advised the king to show no weakness to the people, and to tax them even more, which Rehoboam did.

Although the ostensible reason was the heavy burden laid upon Israel because of Solomon's great outlay for buildings and for luxury of all kinds, the other reasons include the historical opposition between the north and the south. The two sections had acted independently until David, by his victories, succeeded in uniting all the tribes, though the Ephraimitic jealousy was ever ready to develop into open revolt. Religious considerations were also operative. The building of the Temple was a severe blow for the various sanctuaries scattered through the land, and the priests of the high places probably supported the revolt. Josephus (Ant., VIII., viii. 3) has the rebels exclaim: "We leave to Rehoboam the Temple his father built."

Jeroboam and the people rebelled, with the ten northern tribes breaking away and forming a separate kingdom. The new breakaway kingdom continued to be called Kingdom of Israel and was also known as Samaria, or Ephraim or the northern kingdom. The realm Rehoboam was left with was called Kingdom of Judah.

During Rehoboam's 17-year reign, he retained Jerusalem as Judah's capital but

Judah did what was evil in the sight of the Lord, and they provoked him to jealousy with their sins which they committed, more than all that their fathers had done. For they also built for themselves high places and pillars, and Ashe′rim on every high hill and under every green tree, and there were also male cult prostitutes in the land. They did according to all the abominations of the nations which the Lord drove out before the people of Israel.

— 1 Kings 14:22–24

=== Civil war ===
Rehoboam went to war against the new Kingdom of Israel with a force of 180,000 soldiers. However, he was advised against fighting his brethren and so returned to Jerusalem. The narrative reports that Israel and Judah were in a state of war throughout his 17-year reign.

=== Egyptian invasion ===
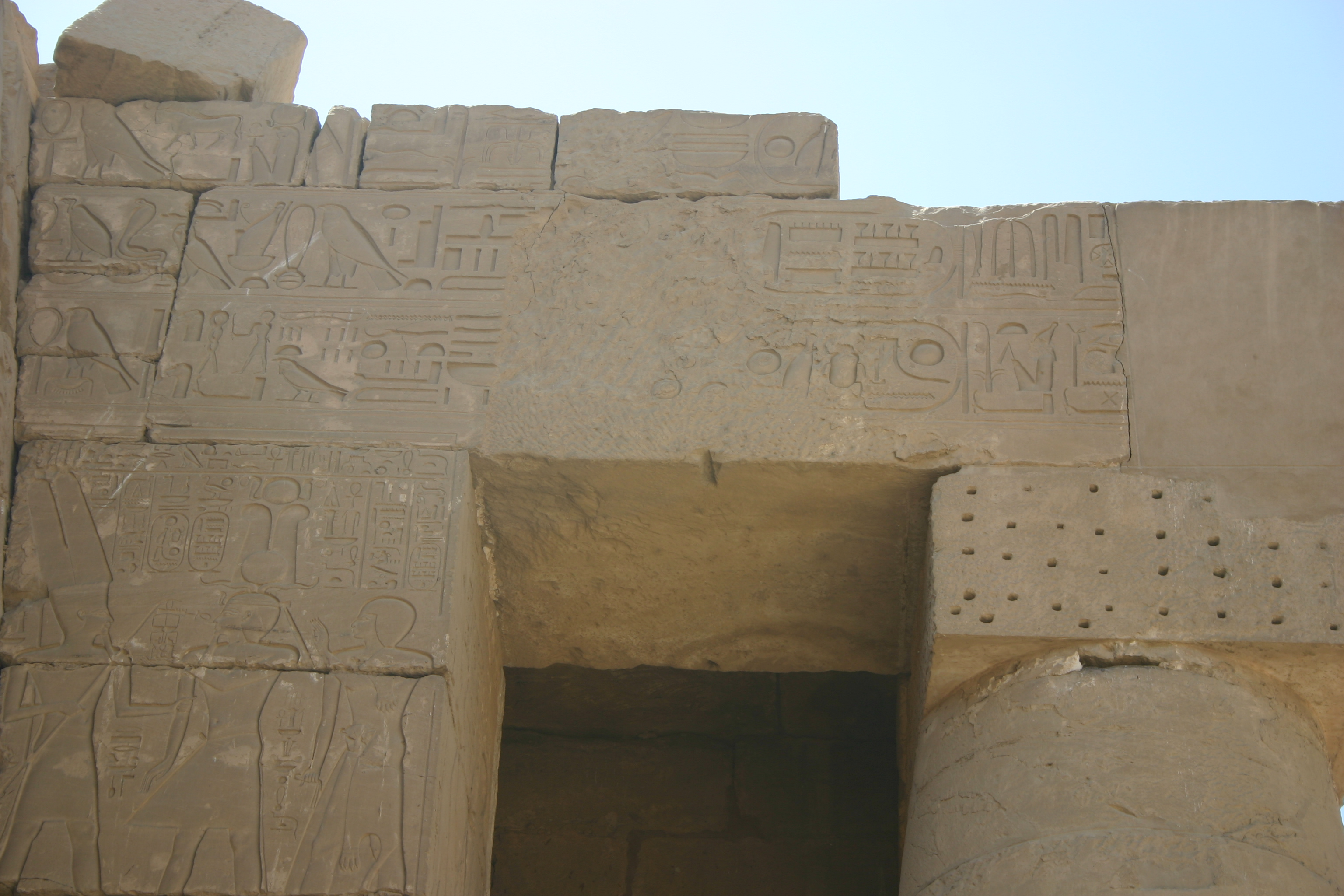
The Bubastite Portal at Karnak, showing cartouches of Sheshonq I mentioning the invasion from the Egyptian perspective.

In the fifth year of Rehoboam's reign, Shishak, king of Egypt, brought a huge army and took many cities. According to Joshua, son of Nadav, the mention in 2 Chronicles 11, 6 sqq., that Rehoboam built fifteen fortified cities, indicates that the attack was not unexpected. The account in Chronicles states that Shishak marched with 1,200 chariots, 60,000 horsemen and troops who came with him from Egypt: Libyans, Sukkites, and Kushites. Shishak's armies captured all of the fortified towns leading to Jerusalem between Gezer and Gibeon. When they laid siege to Jerusalem, Rehoboam gave Shishak all of the treasures of the temple as a tribute. The Egyptian campaign cut off trade with south Arabia via Elath and the Negev that had been established during Solomon's reign. Judah became a vassal state of Egypt.

This invasion is confirmed by records from the Bubastite Portal in Karnak and another archaeological find. Shishak is generally identified with the Egyptian pharaoh Shoshenq I, who invaded Judah. One of the most difficult issues in identifying Shishak with Shoshenq I is the biblical statement that "King Shishak of Egypt attacked Jerusalem. He seized the treasures of the Lord's temple and the royal palace", whereas the Bubastite Portal lists do not include Jerusalem or any city from central Judea among the surviving names in the list of Shoshenq's conquests.

=== Succession ===
Rehoboam had 18 wives and 60 concubines. They bore him 28 sons and 60 daughters. His wives included his cousin Mahalath, the daughter of Jerimoth the son of David, and Abihail, the daughter of Eliab the son of Jesse. His sons with Mahalath were Jeush, Shemariah, and Zaham. After Mahalath he married his cousin Maacah, daughter (or grand-daughter) of Absalom, David's son. His sons with Maacah were Abijam, Attai, Ziza, and Shelomith. The names of his other wives, sons and all his daughters are not given.

Rehoboam reigned for 17 years. When he died, he was buried beside his ancestors in Jerusalem. He was succeeded by his son Abijah.

== Historicity ==
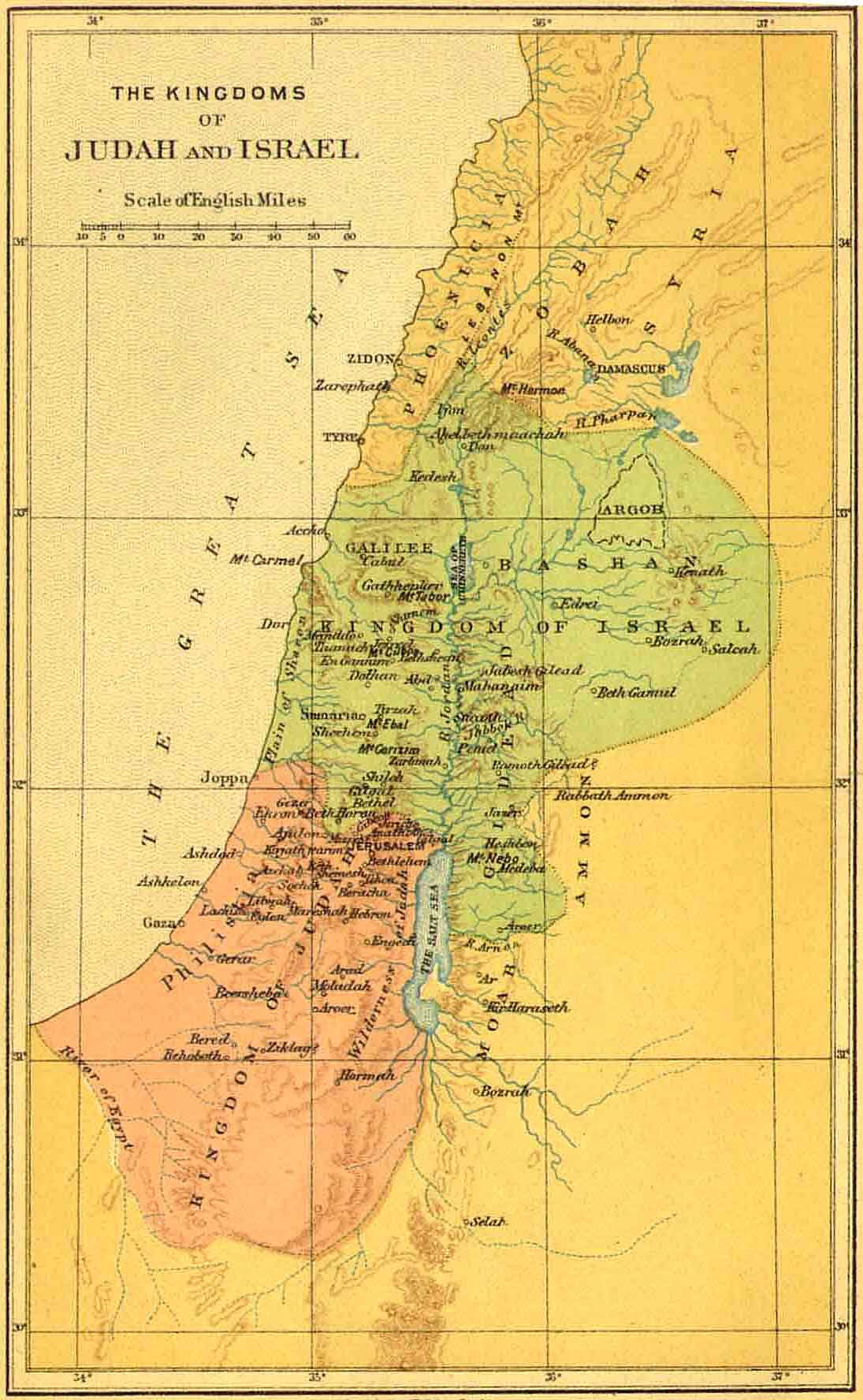
The United Kingdom of Solomon breaks up, with Jeroboam ruling over the Northern Kingdom of Israel (in green on the map).

Extrabiblical evidence for a stable monarchy in Judah during Rehoboam’s reign is scarce, with minimal interest from Shoshenq I and little indication of significant political or economic activity in the region. The similar names of Jeroboam and Rehoboam, along with historical inconsistencies and narrative elements, suggest, according to Christian Frevel, that their biblical portrayal may be a constructed retrojection.

== Rabbinic literature ==
It was difficult to maintain the Messianic claims of the house of David due to that Rehoboam, the son of King Solomon, was born of an Ammonite woman (I Kings, xiv. 21–31); but it was adduced as an illustration of divine Providence which selected the "two doves," Ruth, the Moabite, and Naamah, the Ammonitess, for honourable distinction (B. Ḳ. 38b). Naamah was one of Solomon's wives and mother of Rehoboam (I Kings xiv. 21, 31; II Chron. xii. 13). In the second Greek account (I Kings xii. 24), Naamah is said to have been the daughter of Hanun (Ἄνα), son of Nahash, a king of Ammon (II Sam. x. 1–4). Naamah is praised, in B. Ḳ. 38b, for her righteousness, on account of which Moses had previously been warned by God not to make war upon the Ammonites (comp. Deut. ii. 19), as Naamah was to descend from them.

Rehoboam was the son of an Ammonite woman; and when David praised God because it was permissible to marry Ammonites and Moabites, he held the child upon his knees, giving thanks for himself as well as for Rehoboam, since this permission was of advantage to them both (Yeb. 77a). Rehoboam was stricken with a running sore as a punishment for the curse which David had invoked upon Joab (II Sam. iii. 29) when he prayed that Joab's house might forever be afflicted with leprosy and running sores (Sanh. 48b).

All the treasures which Israel had brought from Egypt were kept until the Egyptian king Shishak (I Kings xiv. 25, 26) took them from Rehoboam (Pes. 119a).

== In Christianity ==
Rehoboam appears in the genealogy of Jesus, in the Gospel of Matthew.

== In popular culture ==
Rehoboam is portrayed by Gino Leurini in The Queen of Sheba (1952) and by Dexter Fletcher in Solomon (1997).

In Season 3 of the HBO show Westworld, the artificial intelligence entity dictating the fate of humans through algorithmic analysis is named “Rehoboam”. It is the successor to a prior version called “Solomon” (which was the successor to “David”.) Like the historical Rehoboam, this artificial intelligence version coincided with the demise of the rule of its line.

In the third episode of season 7 of The Simpsons, titled "Home Sweet Homediddly-Dum-Doodily", where the Flanders' adopt the Simpson children, and perform emergency baptisms after learning the children are unbaptized, Ned Flanders quizzes the Simpson children on their Bible knowledge, during which he references the “Serpent of Rehoboam”.

Rehoboam House of David; Contemporary King of Israel: Jeroboam I
Regnal titles
Preceded by Solomon	King of Judah; 932–915 BCE	Succeeded by Abijam
