= Jeroboam =

Biblical figure and monarch

Jeroboam יָרָבְעָם
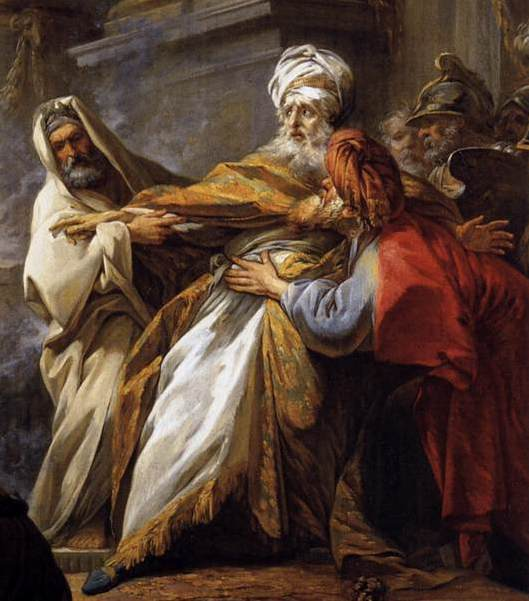
- Detail of Jeroboam Sacrificing to Idols by Fragonard, 1752

King of Israel (Northern Kingdom)
- Reign: 931/22 – 910/901 BC (tentative)
- Predecessor: Rehoboam
- Successor: Nadab
- Born: unknown United Kingdom of Israel
- Died: 910/901 BC (tentative); Tirzah, Northern Kingdom of Israel
- Spouse: Ano (named only in the Septuagint)
- Issue: Abijah; Nadab
- House: New House, Tribe of Ephraim
- Father: Nebat
- Mother: Zeruah

Jeroboam I (/ˌdʒɛrəˈboʊ.əm/; Biblical Hebrew: יָרָבְעָם, romanized: Yāroḇʿām; Greek: Ἱεροβοάμ, romanized: Hieroboám), frequently cited Jeroboam son of Nebat, was the first king of the northern Kingdom of Israel following a revolt of the ten tribes against Rehoboam that put an end to the United Monarchy. According to the book of 1 Kings, he reigned for 22 years and "there was war continually between Rehoboam and Jeroboam". Jeroboam also fought King Abijah of Judah. Jeroboam is often described as "doing evil in the sight of the Lord".

William F. Albright has dated his reign from 922 to 901 BC, while Edwin R. Thiele offers the dates 931 to 910 BC.

There has been much academic discussion in recent years on whether Jeroboam I existed and whether he may be a retrojection of Jeroboam II, though there is not a consensus on the topic.

== Etymology ==
The name Yāroḇʿām יָרָבְעָם is commonly held to have been derived from rīḇ רִיב and ʿam עַם, signifying "the people contend" or "he pleads the people's cause". It is alternatively translated to mean "his people are many" or "he increases the people" (from רבב rbb, meaning "to increase"), or even "he that opposes the people". In the Septuagint he is called Hieroboam (Ἱεροβοάμ).

== Biblical background ==
Jeroboam was the son of Nebat (נֶבֶט), an Ephraimite of Zereda. His mother, (Note: An alternative interpretation of the English text claims Zeruah was the grandmother of Jeroboam, being the mother of Nebat. But this is not supported by the Hebrew source. Additionally throughout the Books of Kings, it is standard practice to also list the names of kings' mothers, on the occasion of the beginning of their reign.) named Zeruah (צרוע "leprous") was a widow. He had at least two sons, Abijah and Nadab; Nadab succeeded Jeroboam on the throne.

King Solomon made the young Jeroboam a superintendent over his tribesmen in the building of the fortress Millo in Jerusalem and of other public works, where he became conversant with the widespread discontent caused by the extravagances which marked the reign of Solomon.

Influenced by the words of the prophet Ahijah the Shilonite, he began to form conspiracies with the aim of becoming king; but these plans were discovered, and he fled to Egypt, where he remained under the protection of Pharaoh Shishak until the death of Solomon. After learning of Solomon’s death, Jeroboam returned and participated in a delegation sent to ask the new king Rehoboam to reduce taxes. After Rehoboam rejected their petition, ten of the tribes withdrew their allegiance to the House of David and proclaimed Jeroboam their king, forming the northern kingdom of Israel (Samaria). Only the tribes of Judah and Benjamin remained to form the kingdom of Judah, loyal to Rehoboam.

=== Temples ===
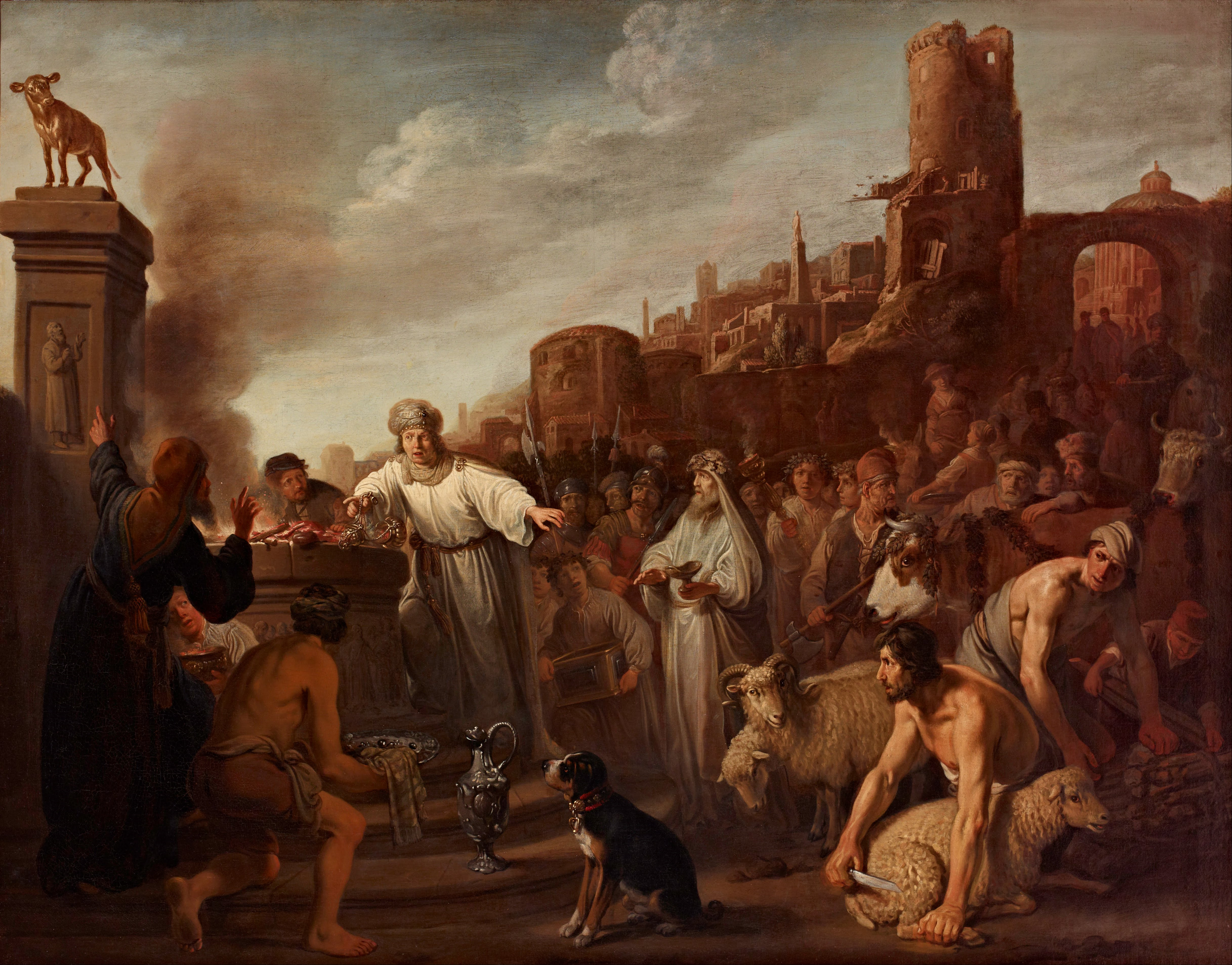
Jeroboam sacrificing to his idol, oil on canvas by Claes Corneliszoon Moeyaert, 1641

Jeroboam rebuilt and fortified Shechem as the capital of the northern kingdom. Fearing that the Three Pilgrimage Festivals at the Temple in Jerusalem prescribed by the Torah might provide an occasion for his people to go back to their old allegiances, Jeroboam built two state temples with golden calves, one in Bethel and the other in Dan. This act is condemned by an unnamed prophet in 1 Kings 13, where the Lord declares that Jeroboam has cast Yahweh behind his back. Jeroboam further deviated from normative Torah law by declaring the holiday of Sukkot in the eighth month of the calendar instead of the seventh (perhaps by adding a leap month in Elul).

According to 1 Kings 13:1–6, while Jeroboam was engaged in offering incense at Bethel, a "man of God" warned him that "a son named Josiah will be born to the house of David", who would destroy the altar (referring to King Josiah of Judah, who would rule approximately three hundred years later). When Jeroboam attempted to have the prophet arrested for his bold words of defiance, the king's hand was "dried up", and the altar before which he stood was rent asunder. At the entreaty of the man of God, his hand was restored to him again, but the miracle made no abiding impression on him. Jeroboam offered hospitality to the man of God but this was declined, not out of contempt but in obedience to the command of God. The prophecy is fulfilled in 2 Kings.

=== Identity of related figures ===
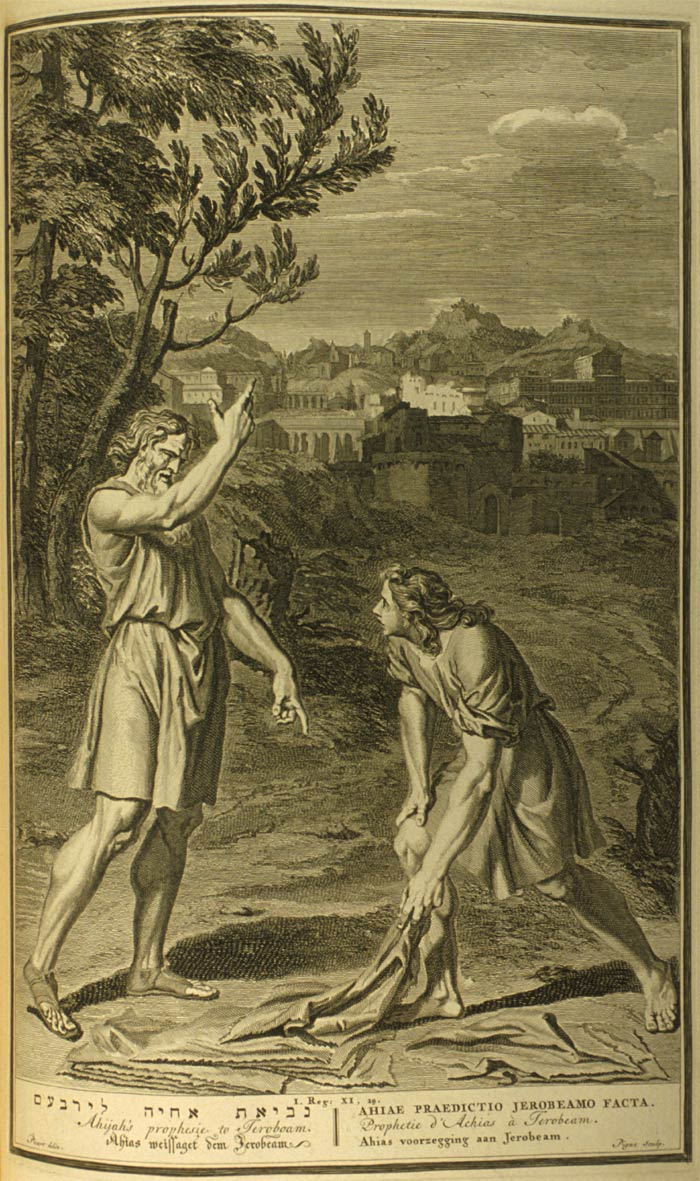
Gerard Hoet, Ahijah's prophecy to Jeroboam, 1728.

Josephus and Jerome identify the "man of God" who warned Jeroboam as the seer named Iddo.

The wife of Jeroboam is a character in the Hebrew Bible. Though unnamed in the Masoretic Text, she appears in the Septuagint as an Egyptian princess called Ano: "And Sousakim gave to Jeroboam Ano the eldest sister of Thekemina his wife, to him as wife; she was great among the king's daughters..."

In 1 Kings, Jeroboam's son Abijah falls ill, and Jeroboam sends his wife to the prophet Ahijah. Ahijah's message, however, is that Abijah will die, which he does. According to The Jewish Encyclopedia, the good that Abijah did for which he would be laid in the grave ("Rabbinical Literature: The passage, I Kings, xiv. 13, in which there is a reference to "some good thing [found in him] toward the Lord God of Israel") is interpreted (M. Ḳ. 28b) as an allusion to Abijah's courageous and pious act in removing the sentinels placed by his father on the frontier between Israel and Judah to prevent pilgrimages to Jerusalem. Some assert that Abijah himself undertook a pilgrimage." Nevertheless, these sentinels on the frontier were not removed until the reign of Hoshea, last king of the northern Kingdom of Israel. The Rabbis explain the description of Hoshea "And he did what was evil in the eyes of the L‑rd, though not like the kings of Israel who had preceded him."

== War with Judah ==
According to the Hebrew Bible, Jeroboam was in "constant war with the house of Judah". While the southern kingdom made no serious military effort to regain power over the north, there was a long-lasting boundary dispute, fighting over which lasted most of Jeroboam’s reign.

In the eighteenth year of Jeroboam's reign, Abijah (also known as Abijam), Rehoboam's son, became king of Judah. During his short reign of three years, Abijah went to considerable lengths to bring the Kingdom of Israel back under his control. He waged a major battle against Jeroboam in the mountains of Ephraim. According to the Book of Chronicles Abijah had a force of 400,000 and Jeroboam 800,000. The Biblical sources mention that Abijah addressed the armies of Israel, urging them to submit and to let the Kingdom of Israel be whole again, but his plea fell on deaf ears. The biblical account states that his elite warriors fended off a pincer movement and routed Jeroboam's troops, killing 500,000 of them.

Jeroboam was crippled by this severe defeat to Abijah and posed little threat to the Kingdom of Judah for the rest of his reign. He also lost the towns of Bethel, Jeshanah, and Ephron, with their surrounding villages. Bethel was an important centre for Jeroboam's Golden Calf cult (which used non-Levites as priests), located on Israel's southern border, which had been allocated to the Tribe of Benjamin by Joshua, as was Ephron, which is believed to be the Ophrah that was allocated to the Tribe of Benjamin by Joshua.

Jeroboam died soon after Abijam.

== Rabbinic literature ==
According to Rabbinic literature, Gehazi possessed a magnet by which he lifted up the idol made by Jeroboam, so that it was seen between heaven and earth; he had "Yhwh" engraved on it, and in consequence the idol (a calf) pronounced the first two words of the Decalogue

That Ahijah, though one of the pillars of righteousness, should have been sent to Jeroboam with a divine message inducing him to establish his idolatrous kingdom is explained by the rabbis in the following manner: They say that he was entrapped by a ruse of Jeroboam's idolatrous friends, who circulated a document requesting Jeroboam to become king and stipulating that, if he were elected, he set up a golden calf at Dan and Beth-El. Ahijah signed this document, believing firmly that Jeroboam would not betray his trust. In this he was mistaken. Jeroboam had shown great wisdom and learning, and appeared to Ahijah "as pure as the new garment" he wore when Ahijah saw him coming out of Jerusalem (1 Kings 11:29). Moreover, as he excelled all the rest of the students, he had been initiated by Ahijah into the innermost secrets of the Law. Just as the words said of Isaac, "his eyes were dim, so that he could not see" (Gen 27:1), are taken to refer to spiritual blindness (because he favored his wicked son Esau), so the words, "Ahijah could not see, for his eyes were set by reason of his age" (1 Kings 14:4), imply spiritual blindness on the part of Ahijah, who favored a wicked student and set him up as ruler. For this reason Ahijah was stricken with the plague.

Jeroboam became for the rabbinical writers a prototypical evildoer. This appears in the Septuagint (2d recension), where even his mother is represented as a disreputable woman. His name is explained as "one that caused strife among the people," or "one that caused strife between the people and their Heavenly Father". The name (Nebat) of his father is construed as implying some defect in his progenitor. Although Jeroboam reached the throne because he reproved Solomon, he was nevertheless punished for doing so publicly. In the meeting between Jeroboam and Ahijah, the Rabbis detect indications of Jeroboam's presumption, his zeal for impious innovations. His arrogance brought about his doom. His political reasons for introducing idolatry are condemned. As one that led many into sin, the sins of many cling to him. He is said to have invented 103 interpretations of the law in reference to the priests to justify his course. At first God was pleased with him and his sacrifice because he was pious, and in order to prevent his going astray proposed to His council of angels to remove him from earth, but He was prevailed upon to let him live; and then Jeroboam, while still a lad, turned to wickedness. God had offered to raise him into Gan Eden; but when Jeroboam heard that David would enjoy the highest honors there, he refused. Jeroboam had even learned the "mysteries of the chariot". Jeroboam is excluded from the world to come. Nevertheless, he will still arise when the time of resurrection arrives, as compensation for the fact that many years after he died his remains were ignominiously burned in fire.

An account of Rabbi Joshua ben Levi tells how in the fourth compartment of Gehenna are ten nations presided over by Jeroboam. Jeroboam, however, has immunity for he himself had studied the Law, and he comes from those who had said: "We will do and hearken."

== Commentary on sources ==
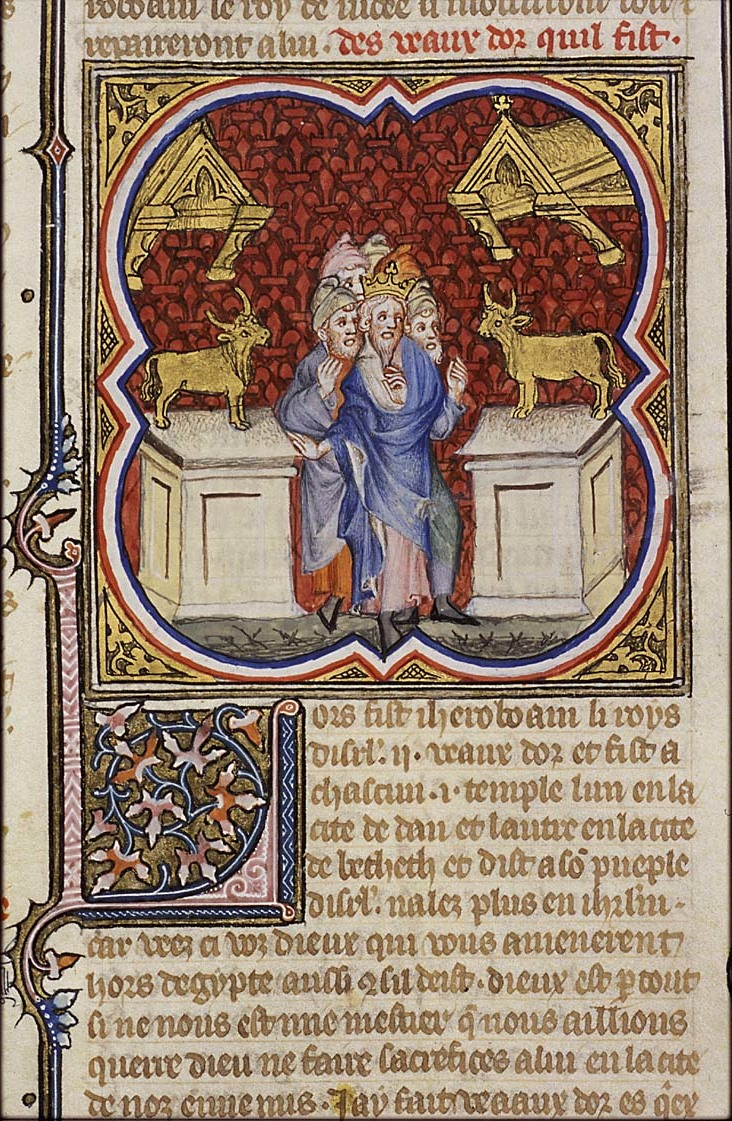
Jeroboam setting up two golden calves, Bible Historiale, 1372

The account of Jeroboam's life, like that of all his successors, ends with the formula "And the rest of the acts of Jeroboam, how he warred, and how he reigned, behold, they are written in the book of the chronicles of the kings of Israel".

"The Chronicles of the Kings of Israel", likely compiled by or derived from these kings' own scribes, is likely the source for the basic facts of Jeroboam's life and reign, though the compiler(s) of the extant Book of Kings clearly made selective use of it and added hostile commentaries. His family was eventually wiped out.

The prophecies of doom concerning the fall of both the House of Jeroboam and the northern kingdom as a whole ("For the Lord shall smite Israel..., and he shall root up Israel out of this good land, which he gave to their fathers, and shall scatter them beyond the river", might have been composed retroactively, after the events described had already come to pass. Alternatively, the prophecy could have been a logical deduction. Judah had just been conquered and turned into a vassal of Egypt, while Israel stood between the Egyptian and Mesopotamian empires.

Oded and Sperling argued that the story of the golden calf in the wilderness was composed as a polemic against Jeroboam's cultic restoration by claiming that its origins were inconsistent with worship of YHWH.

Thomas Römer argued that Jeroboam I may not have existed and that Deuteronomistic redactors transferred data from the reign of Jeroboam II to Jeroboam I, although Lester L. Grabbe finds this theory unlikely.

== In popular culture ==
Jeroboam is portrayed by Nickolas Grace in Solomon & Sheba (1995) and by Richard Dillane in Solomon (1997). Both of these are television films.

Within the range of standard liquor bottle sizes, a Jeroboam (also called a Double Magnum) contains 3 liters (101.4 fluid ounces). A Rehoboam contains 4.5 liters (152.2 fluid ounces).

The Jeroboam is the name of a whaling ship in Moby Dick. Ahab and Ishmael's ship, the Pequod, meets the Jeroboam in Chapter 71, and learns of its trials.

Jeroboam Tribe of Ephraim; Contemporary Kings of Judah: Rehoboam, Abijam, Asa
Regnal titles
Preceded by Solomon, Rehoboam	King of Israel; 931–910 BCE	Succeeded by Nadab
