= Peter James (historian) =

British historian

Peter James (1952 - 2024) was a British author specializing in the ancient history and archaeology of the Eastern Mediterranean region, with key related interests being chronology (dating techniques), ancient technology and astronomy, and sub-Roman Britain. He graduated in archaeology and ancient history at the University of Birmingham and pursued postgraduate research in ancient history at University College London. He has published four books (three co-authored) on various aspects of ancient history.

== Alternative Bronze Age chronology ==
In his best known work, Centuries of Darkness (1991), he and four colleagues challenged traditional chronology for the Bronze to Iron Ages in the Near East and the Eastern Mediterranean. In particular, they advanced the idea that the Greek Dark Ages can be drastically reduced and arose solely from a misreading of key elements of the history of ancient Egypt. Ongoing criticism and discussion of the evidence is listed on the authors' own website. Reviews at the time were sharply divided on the merits of the book, but there was generally more praise for the critique of problems in the conventional ancient Egyptian chronology than for the proposed knock-on revisions to the chronologies of surrounding cultures. The Centuries of Darkness (CoD) debate has recently been met with increased interest, partly due to the organisation of three colloquiums on the subject of ancient World Chronology.

== Attempts to identify Atlantis ==
In The Sunken Kingdom: The Atlantis Mystery Solved, James gives a hypothesis for the location of Atlantis. By first claiming that references to mythological Tantalis by Plato were in fact meant to identify a Lydian king by the name of Tantalus, James identifies Atlantis with a hypothetical lost temple city called Tantalis, now Manisa, Turkey.

== Bibliography ==
- Centuries of Darkness: A Challenge to the Conventional Chronology of Old World Archaeology, in collaboration with I.J. Thorpe [et al.], Rutgers University Press, New Brunswick, NJ., 1993, ISBN 0-8135-1950-0 (hardcover), ISBN 0-8135-1951-9 (paperback); originally published by Jonathan Cape, London, 1991, ISBN 0-224-02647-X
- The Sunken Kingdom: The Atlantis Mystery Solved, Jonathan Cape, London, 1995, ISBN 0-224-03810-9 (hardcover); Pimlico, London, 1996. ISBN 0-7126-7499-3 (paperback)
- Ancient Inventions, with I.J. Thorpe, Michael O'Mara, London, 1995, ISBN 1-85479-777-8
- Ancient Mysteries, with I.J. Thorpe, Ballantine, New York, 1999, ISBN 0-345-40195-6
- (with P. van der Veen) Solomon and Shishak: Current Perspectives from Archaeology, Epigraphy, History and Chronology, Proceedings of the Third BICANE Colloquium held at Sidney Sussex College, Cambridge 26–27 March 2011, BAR International Series 2732, Oxford, 2015, ISBN 978-1407313894
- J. M. Tebes Review of Solomon and Shishak in Antiguo Oriente (2017): http://bibliotecadigital.uca.edu.ar/greenstone/cgi-bin/library.cgi?a=d&c=Revistas&d=james-der-veen-solomon-shishak.
- Ronald Wallenfels, “Shishak and Shoshenq: A Disambiguation” in Journal of the Ancient Oriental Society (issue 139.2 (2019), pp. 487–500): https://www.academia.edu/40041219/Shishak_and_Shoshenq_A_Disambiguation
