= Tahpenes =

Tahpenes (/ˈtɑːpəniːz, tɑːˈpiːniːz/; Biblical Hebrew: תַּחְפְּנֵיס/תַּחְפְּנֵס, romanized: Taḥpənēs; Koine Greek: Θεκεμιμας, romanized: Thekemimas or Θεχεμινας Thekheminas; possibly derived from Egyptian tꜣ ḥmt nswt the Wife of the King, Late Egyptian pronunciation: /taʔ ˈħiːmə ʔənˈsiːʔ/) was an Egyptian queen regnant mentioned in the Books of Kings. She appeared in 1 Kings 11:19–20, where the pharaoh awarded Hadad the Edomite with Tahpenes' sister in marriage. Tahpenes weaned Genubath, who was the son of Hadad and her sister, and who was also raised in the pharaoh's household.

Tahpenes also references a location, probably a city in ancient Egypt. In this context, Tahpenes is mentioned in Jeremiah 2:16.
