= 2 Chronicles 19 =

Second Book of Chronicles, chapter 19

- ← chapter 18 chapter 20 →
- The complete Hebrew text of the Books of Chronicles (1st and 2nd Chronicles) in the Leningrad Codex (1008 CE).
- Book: Books of Chronicles
- Category: Ketuvim
- Christian Bible part: Old Testament
- Order in the Christian part: 14

2 Chronicles 19 is the nineteenth chapter of the Second Book of Chronicles the Old Testament in the Christian Bible or of the second part of the Books of Chronicles in the Hebrew Bible. The book is compiled from older sources by an unknown person or group, designated by modern scholars as "the Chronicler", and had the final shape established in late fifth or fourth century BCE. This chapter belongs to the section focusing on the kingdom of Judah until its destruction by the Babylonians under Nebuchadnezzar and the beginning of restoration under Cyrus the Great of Persia (2 Chronicles 10 to 36). The focus of this chapter (as all chapters from 17 to 20) is the reign of Jehoshaphat, king of Judah.

== Text ==
This chapter was originally written in the Hebrew language and is divided into 11 verses.

=== Textual witnesses ===
Some early manuscripts containing the text of this chapter in Hebrew are of the Masoretic Text tradition, which includes the Aleppo Codex (10th century), and Codex Leningradensis (1008).

There is also a translation into Koine Greek known as the Septuagint, made in the last few centuries BCE. Extant ancient manuscripts of the Septuagint version include Codex Vaticanus (B; $\mathfrak{G}$^{B}; 4th century), and Codex Alexandrinus (A; $\mathfrak{G}$^{A}; 5th century). (Note: The whole book of 2 Chronicles is missing from the extant Codex Sinaiticus.)

=== Old Testament references ===
- 2 Chronicles 19:2: 1 Kings 16:1; 2 Chronicles 18:1,3; 2 Chronicles 20:34; 2 Chronicles 24:18
- 2 Chronicles 19:10: Deuteronomy 17:8; 2 Chronicles 19:2

== Jehoshaphat reproved by Jehu (19:1–3) ==
Jehoshaphat's safe home return (in contrast to Ahab's death) literally fulfilled Micaiah's demands (18:16), although 'not complying with the spirit of his plea'. The prophet Jehu, the son of Hanani (cf. 2 Chronicles 16:7–9) rebuked Jehoshaphat for making an alliance with Ahab of Israel (cf. 2 Chronicles 16:1–6), because with the act, Jehoshaphat was not faithful to God in that 'he proposed to help the wicked and was loyal to those who hate the Lord'. 'Love' and 'hate' here are not 'emotional terms', but parts of a 'political vocabulary'; 'to love' means virtually 'to form a coalition'. The attacke by the Transjordanian alliance in chapter 20 could be interpreted as the realization of God's anger at Jehoshaphat.

== Jehoshaphat's reforms (19:4–11) ==
Jehoshaphat continued to develop the policies he established at the start of his reign (2 Chronicles 17), extending to the territory of northern kingdom he controlled (verse 4; cf. 2 Chronicles 17:1–2). The judicial reform may reflect the element "shaphat" ("to judge") in Jehoshaphat's name (cf. 2 Chronicles 16:12).

=== Verse 11 ===
And, behold, Amariah the chief priest is over you in all matters of the Lord; and Zebadiah the son of Ishmael, the ruler of the house of Judah, for all the king's matters: also the Levites shall be officers before you. Deal courageously, and the Lord shall be with the good.

- " Amariah the chief priest": or "High Priest" (ha-rosh, "the Head"; cf. 2 Chronicles 24:6). 1 Chronicles 6:11 (KJV; or 1 Chronicles 5:37 in Hebrew Bible) lists Amariah as the fifth generation from Zadok, the High Priest during David and Solomon's time, whereas Jehoshaphat was the fifth king from David, so the name Amariah should denote the same person in both verses.

The distinction between "matters of the Lord" and "matters of the king" is found only in the books of Chronicles (1 Chronicles 26:30, 32; 2 Chronicles 19:11) and book of Ezra (Ezra 7:26).

== See also ==
- Ahab
- Amariah
- Asherah pole
- Beersheba
- Hanani
- Jehu (prophet)
- Jerusalem
- Kohen
- Mitzvah
- Mount Ephraim
- Levite
- Torah
- Zadok
- Zebadiah
- Related Bible parts: 2 Samuel 8, 1 Kings 3, 1 Kings 22, 2 Chronicles 16, 2 Chronicles 17

== Sources ==
- Ackroyd, Peter R (1993). "Chronicles, Books of". In Metzger, Bruce M; Coogan, Michael D (eds.). The Oxford Companion to the Bible. Oxford University Press. pp. 113–116. ISBN 978-0195046458.
- Bennett, William (2018). The Expositor's Bible: The Books of Chronicles. Litres. ISBN 978-5040825196.
- Coogan, Michael David (2007). Coogan, Michael David; Brettler, Marc Zvi; Newsom, Carol Ann; Perkins, Pheme (eds.). The New Oxford Annotated Bible with the Apocryphal/Deuterocanonical Books: New Revised Standard Version, Issue 48 (Augmented 3rd ed.). Oxford University Press. ISBN 9780195288810.
- Mabie, Frederick (2017). "I. The Chronicler's Genealogical Survey of All Israel". In Longman III, Tremper; Garland, David E (eds.). 1 and 2 Chronicles. The Expositor's Bible Commentary. Zondervan. pp. 267–308. ISBN 978-0310531814.
- Mathys, H. P. (2007). "14. 1 and 2 Chronicles". In Barton, John; Muddiman, John (eds.). The Oxford Bible Commentary (first (paperback) ed.). Oxford University Press. pp. 267–308. ISBN 978-0199277186.
- McFall, Leslie (1991), "Translation Guide to the Chronological Data in Kings and Chronicles" (PDF), Bibliotheca Sacra, 148: 3-45, archived from the original (PDF) on 2010-08-27
- Thiele, Edwin R. (1983). The Mysterious Numbers of the Hebrew Kings (3rd ed.). Grand Rapids, Michigan: Zondervan. ISBN 978-0-310-36010-0.
- Würthwein, Ernst (1995). The Text of the Old Testament. Translated by Rhodes, Erroll F. Grand Rapids, MI: William B. Eerdmans. ISBN 0-8028-0788-7.
