= 2 Chronicles 20 =

Second Book of Chronicles, chapter 20

- ← chapter 19 chapter 21 →
- The complete Hebrew text of the Books of Chronicles (1st and 2nd Chronicles) in the Leningrad Codex (1008 CE).
- Book: Books of Chronicles
- Category: Ketuvim
- Christian Bible part: Old Testament
- Order in the Christian part: 14

2 Chronicles 20 is the twentieth chapter of the Second Book of Chronicles the Old Testament in the Christian Bible or of the second part of the Books of Chronicles in the Hebrew Bible. The book is compiled from older sources by an unknown person or group, designated by modern scholars as "the Chronicler", and had the final shape established in late fifth or fourth century BCE. This chapter belongs to the section focusing on the kingdom of Judah until its destruction by the Babylonians under Nebuchadnezzar and the beginning of restoration under Cyrus the Great of Persia (2 Chronicles 10 to 36). The focus of this chapter (as all chapters from 17 to 20) is the reign of Jehoshaphat, king of Judah.

== Text ==
This chapter was originally written in the Hebrew language and is divided into 37 verses.

=== Textual witnesses ===
Some early manuscripts containing the text of this chapter in Hebrew are of the Masoretic Text tradition, which includes the Aleppo Codex (10th century), and Codex Leningradensis (1008).

There is also a translation into Koine Greek known as the Septuagint, made in the last few centuries BCE. Extant ancient manuscripts of the Septuagint version include Codex Vaticanus (B; $\mathfrak{G}$^{B}; 4th century), and Codex Alexandrinus (A; $\mathfrak{G}$^{A}; 5th century). (Note: The whole book of 2 Chronicles is missing from the extant Codex Sinaiticus.)

=== Old Testament references ===
- 2 Chronicles 20:6: Deuteronomy 4:39; 1 Chronicles 29:11
- 2 Chronicles 20:7: Psalm 135:10–12; Isaiah 41:8
- 2 Chronicles 20:9: 2 Chronicles 6:20, 6:28–30
- 2 Chronicles 20:10: Numbers 20:14–21; Deuteronomy 2:4–9; 2 Chronicles 20:1,22

== Jehoshaphat Defeats Moab and Ammon (20:1–30) ==
This section contains the battle report of Jehoshaphat against the southeastern Transjordanian coalition of powers, but it was exclusively a sacral war (verse 15: "the battle is not yours, but God's") as the enemies destroyed themselves and the people of Judah only came to sing and pick up the spoils of war. Informed about the invasion of a huge enemy, Jehoshaphat resorted to prayer (verses 6–12), which was also called a 'national lament' (echoing Solomon's prayer in 2 Chronicles 6:28, 34), addressing YHWH as 'O LORD, God of our ancestors' and 'the ruler of all peoples who gave the Israelites their land'. YHWH ordered Israel not to attack these Transjordanian neighbors (Deuteronomy 2), but as they attacked, Jehoshaphat appealed to YHWH for their expulsion from his land. Jahaziel, a Levitical singer, served as the designated priest to proclaim God's assurance of victory (cf. Deuteronomy 20:2-4; 1 Chronicles 25:1-8), as a result of faith in God, quoting both Moses (Exodus 14:13-14) and David (1 Samuel 7:47). As previous sacral wars, 'the fear of God descends upon all the kingdoms of the countries' (cf. Exodus 15:14-16; Deuteronomy 2:25; 11:25; Joshua 2:9, 11, 24; 10:1-2; 1 Samuel 4:7-8; 14:15; 1 Chronicles 14:7; 2 Chronicles 14:13). Jehoshaphat, all Judeans and the citizens of Jerusalem reacted joyfully by worshipping YHWH (verses 18–19) followed by the Levites, who sang praises to God, even before the salvation happened. The entire action of God (verse 20) took place early in the morning (that is, the time at which God usually acted), leaving no survivor among the enemy armies and the largest spoils in the entire Hebrew Bible (taking three days to collect). The war ended where it began, in the temple of Jerusalem (verses 26–28) and with music (verses 29–30, cf. 17:10; typical for the Chronicles). As fear of YHWH struck not only Judah's neighboring kingdoms, but also all the kingdoms in the region, Judah was in peace as a reward for the nation's exemplary conduct.

== The end of Jehoshaphat's reign (20:31–37) ==
Jehoshaphat second misstep happened at the end of his reign that he again worked together with another king of northern kingdom (Ahaziah the son of Ahab). Despite a warning given through a prophet, Jehoshaphat went on with his alliance and therefore was condemned to failure, although this (as well as the previous misstep) did not affect the positive judgement for his reign.

=== Verse 31 ===
And Jehoshaphat reigned over Judah. He was thirty-five years old when he began his reign, and he was king in Jerusalem for twenty-five years. The name of his mother was Azubah the daughter of Shilhi.

- Cross reference: 1 Kings 22:41–42
- "Twenty-five years": in Thiele's chronology (improved by McFall), Jehoshaphat became coregent in Tishrei (September) 873 BCE (Thiele has 872 BCE, on the 39th year of Asa, his father), and starting to rule as a sole king between September 870 and April 869 BCE (when Asa died) until his death between April and September 848 BCE. It is not clear whether Jehoshaphat was 35 years of age when he became coregent or when he became king; his age of death would be at 59 if the former, or at 56 if the latter.

=== Verse 36 ===
And he allied himself with him to make ships to go to Tarshish, and they made the ships in Ezion Geber.

- Cross references: 1 Kings 22:48–49
- "Ships to go to Tarshish": is a phrase which may mean "vessels built for long sea-voyages", because according to 1 Kings, the ships were built “to go to Ophir for gold” (1 Kings 22:48; cf. 2 Chronicles 8:18; 1 Kings 9:28; 1 Kings 10:11; Psalm 45:9), possibly referring to "India". This interpretation is more logical because Ezion-Geber was a port on the Red Sea for vessels sailing eastward, while Tarshish (identified as Tartessos in the Iberian Peninsula) was in the west.

== See also ==
- Abraham
- Ahab
- Ahaziah
- Ammon
- Book of Jehu
- Ein Gedi
- Hanani
- Jehu (prophet)
- Jerusalem
- Kohen
- Mitzvah
- Moab
- Mount Ephraim
- Mount Seir
- Levite
- Torah
- Ziz
- Related Bible parts: Deuteronomy 4, Numbers 20, 1 Kings 3, 1 Kings 22, 2 Chronicles 16, 2 Chronicles 17, Psalm 135

== Sources ==
- Ackroyd, Peter R (1993). "Chronicles, Books of". In Metzger, Bruce M; Coogan, Michael D (eds.). The Oxford Companion to the Bible. Oxford University Press. pp. 113–116. ISBN 978-0195046458.
- Bennett, William (2018). The Expositor's Bible: The Books of Chronicles. Litres. ISBN 978-5040825196.
- Coogan, Michael David (2007). Coogan, Michael David; Brettler, Marc Zvi; Newsom, Carol Ann; Perkins, Pheme (eds.). The New Oxford Annotated Bible with the Apocryphal/Deuterocanonical Books: New Revised Standard Version, Issue 48 (Augmented 3rd ed.). Oxford University Press. ISBN 9780195288810.
- Mabie, Frederick (2017). "I. The Chronicler's Genealogical Survey of All Israel". In Longman III, Tremper; Garland, David E (eds.). 1 and 2 Chronicles. The Expositor's Bible Commentary. Zondervan. pp. 267–308. ISBN 978-0310531814.
- Mathys, H. P. (2007). "14. 1 and 2 Chronicles". In Barton, John; Muddiman, John (eds.). The Oxford Bible Commentary (first (paperback) ed.). Oxford University Press. pp. 267–308. ISBN 978-0199277186.
- McFall, Leslie (1991), "Translation Guide to the Chronological Data in Kings and Chronicles" (PDF), Bibliotheca Sacra, 148: 3-45, archived from the original (PDF) on 2010-08-27
- Thiele, Edwin R. (1983). The Mysterious Numbers of the Hebrew Kings (3rd ed.). Grand Rapids, Michigan: Zondervan. ISBN 978-0-310-36010-0.
- Würthwein, Ernst (1995). The Text of the Old Testament. Translated by Rhodes, Erroll F. Grand Rapids, MI: William B. Eerdmans. ISBN 0-8028-0788-7.
