= 1 Kings 15 =

1 Kings, chapter 15

- ← chapter 14 chapter 16 →
- The pages containing the Books of Kings (1 & 2 Kings) Leningrad Codex (1008 CE).
- Book: First book of Kings
- Hebrew Bible part: Nevi'im
- Order in the Hebrew part: 4
- Category: Former Prophets
- Christian Bible part: Old Testament
- Order in the Christian part: 11

1 Kings 15 is the fifteenth chapter of the Books of Kings in the Hebrew Bible or the First Book of Kings in the Old Testament of the Christian Bible. The book is a compilation of various annals recording the acts of the kings of Israel and Judah by a Deuteronomic compiler in the seventh century BCE, with a supplement added in the sixth century BCE. 1 Kings 12:1-16:14 documents the consolidation of the kingdoms of northern Israel and Judah. This chapter focusses on the reigns of Abijam (or Abijah) and Asa in the southern kingdom, as well as Nadab and Baasha in the northern kingdom.

== Text ==
This chapter was originally written in the Hebrew language and since the 16th century is divided into 34 verses.

=== Textual witnesses ===
Some early manuscripts containing the text of this chapter in Hebrew are of the Masoretic Text tradition, which includes the Codex Cairensis (895), Aleppo Codex (10th century), and Codex Leningradensis (1008).

There is also a translation into Koine Greek known as the Septuagint, made in the last few centuries BCE. Extant ancient manuscripts of the Septuagint version include Codex Vaticanus (B; $\mathfrak{G}$^{B}; 4th century) and Codex Alexandrinus (A; $\mathfrak{G}$^{A}; 5th century). (Note: The whole book of 1 Kings is missing from the extant Codex Sinaiticus.)

=== Old Testament references ===
- 1 Kings 15:1–8: 2 Chronicles 13:1–3
- 1 Kings 15:9–15: 2 Chronicles 14:1–15; 2 Chronicles 15:8–19
- 1 Kings 15:16–22: 2 Chronicles 16:1–6
- 1 Kings 15:23–24: 2 Chronicles 17:1–19

== Abijam, the king of Judah (15:1–8) ==
Abijam is the first king who is given synchronized dating, that is, correlation to the line of kings in the northern kingdoms, a reminder of the common heritage, despite their separate development, as the people of YHWH. The names of the Judean queen mothers are always noted for specific political reasons: as an overriding factor to decide who took up the reins of the government among rival parties and interest-groups (cf. 1 Kings 1), also as she held a specific rank of 'mistress' (synonymous with the Hebrew word for 'queen mother') giving her power especially in the case of her son's death, similar to other cultures of the ancient Near East, such as amongst the Hittites. Abijam did not rule for long (about two full years, cf. verse 1 with 15:9; the number 'three' in 15:2 can be explained since the years of accession and death were not complete calendar years). Abijam was given a poor rating as a king, because he did not reverse the (alleged) atrocities introduced by Rehoboam, and failed to be "like David", but for David's sake, God still gave "a lamp in Jerusalem" (verse 4; cf. 1 Kings 11:36) even when there were conflicts with the northern state at this time (v. 7b, probably a note from the annals of the Judean kings).

=== Verses 1–2 ===
^{1} Now in the eighteenth year of king Jeroboam the son of Nebat reigned Abijam over Judah.
^{2} Three years reigned he in Jerusalem. and his mother's name was Maachah, the daughter of Abishalom.

- Cross references: 2 Chronicles 13:1–2
- "Eighteenth year of king Jeroboam...three years reigned he": in Thiele's chronology (improved by McFall), Abijam became king between April and September 913 BCE and died between September 911 and April 910 BCE (his age was omitted). This is the only synchronism with the kingdom of Israel recorded by the Chronicler, who called him "Abijah".
- "Maachah, the daughter of Abishalom": Abijam's mother was Maacah, the 'granddaughter' (in Hebrew also called 'daughter') of Abishalom (=Absalom) the son of David (Maacah's mother Tamar was the daughter of Absalom mentioned in 2 Samuel 14:27, and Maacah's father is named as Uriel of Gibeah in 2 Chronicles 13:2).

== Asa, the king of Judah (15:9–24) ==
Asa reigned for an unusually long time in Jerusalem, seeing five Israelite kings rise and fall before Ahab started to reign, until Asa was 'diseased in his feet' in old age, which indicates his son Jehoshaphat's regency during Asa's lifetime. He was given a good assessment compared to David, though he did not abolish the high places outside Jerusalem (which was left to Josiah, 2 Kings 23:8), but otherwise was regarded as exemplary as he 'made pious donations' to the temple, 'chased the cult-prostitutes out' of the land (cf. 1 Kings 14:24), and dismissed the queen mother (his grandmother) 'because she had made an abominable image for Asherah'. The queen mother, Maacah, was the mother of Abijam, not Asa, but kept her position as queen mother following Abijam's early death until Asa relieved her of the post. Asa's strategy to fend off northern Israel's provocative expansion of the Benjaminite town of Ramah into a border fortress (cf. Joshua 18:25) was questionable, because he incited the Aramean king in Damascus to carry out a military attack on northern Israel, devastating Galilee, and while the Israelite king turned his back on the south to concentrate on the enemy in the north, Asa took the chance to build his own border fortress in Ramah, using the available materials from the northern kingdom.

=== Verses 9–10 ===
^{9}And in the twentieth year of Jeroboam king of Israel reigned Asa over Judah.
^{10} And forty and one years reigned he in Jerusalem. And his mother's name was Maachah, the daughter of Abishalom.

- Cross references: 2 Chronicles 16:13
- "The twentieth year of Jeroboam...forty and one years reigned he": in Thiele's chronology (improved by McFall), Asa became king between September 911 and April 910 BCE and died between September 870 and April 869 BCE (his age was omitted).

== Nadab, the king of Israel (15:25–32) ==
The narrative turns to the kingdom of northern Israel, where Nadab, son of Jeroboam I, inherited a dynasty which only lasted a short time, although he managed to wage war against the Philistines in the Philistine territory (apparently resumed the war which Saul had begun; cf. 1 Samuel 13–14; 31). The motives of Baasha was not clear on why he overthrew the king and liquidated the entire royal family, other than stated as everything came to pass as prophesied by the prophet Ahijah that due to Jeroboam's sin, his 'house' had to be eliminated and Baasha carried it out. However, this is not a licence for political murder, for in 1 Kings 16:7 Baasha and his son would pay the price for the bloodbath he brought upon the house of Jeroboam (God may use humans as instruments of his judgement, but he does not condone their crimes).

=== Verse 25 ===
And Nadab the son of Jeroboam began to reign over Israel in the second year of Asa king of Judah, and reigned over Israel two years.

- "The second year of Asa...reigned over Israel two years": in Thiele's chronology (improved by McFall), Nadab became king between September 910 and April 909 BCE and died between September 909 and April 908 BCE.

== Baasha, the king of Israel (15:33–34) ==
It is already recorded in previous passages how Baasha became the second founder of a dynasty in the northern kingdom of Israel (after killing the heir of the previous dynasty, 15:27–28), and was involved in a war on two fronts against Judah and Syria (15:17–22). Now it is noted that he reigned for twenty-four years in Tirzah, a city in the territory of Manasseh (generally identified as "el-Far'ah", about 10 km. north of Nablus) which Jeroboam had already used as a residence (1 Kings 14:17). Baasha was given a poor rating as king because he walked 'in the way of Jeroboam', a religious (not political) criteria, as he left the bull cult of Bethel (and Dan) untouched.

=== Verse 33 ===
In the third year of Asa king of Judah began Baasha the son of Ahijah to reign over all Israel in Tirzah, twenty and four years.

- "The third year of Asa... reign...twenty and four years": in Thiele's chronology (improved by McFall), Baasha became king between September 909 and April 908 BCE (after killing Nadab) and died between September 886 and April 885 BCE.

== See also ==
- Abijam or Abijah, king of Judah
- Benhadad
- Chronicles of the Kings of Israel
- Chronicles of the Kings of Judah
- David
- Idolatry
- Israel
- Jeroboam
- Jerusalem
- Kingdom of Judah
- Nadab, king of Israel
- Prophet
- Solomon's Temple
- Tirzah
- Related Bible parts: 1 Kings 13, 1 Kings 14, 2 Kings 23, 2 Chronicles 13, 2 Chronicles 14, 2 Chronicles 15, 2 Chronicles 16, 2 Chronicles 17

== Sources ==
- Collins, John J. (2014). "Chapter 14: 1 Kings 12 – 2 Kings 25". Introduction to the Hebrew Scriptures. Fortress Press. pp. 277–296. ISBN 978-1451469233.
- Coogan, Michael David (2007). Coogan, Michael David; Brettler, Marc Zvi; Newsom, Carol Ann; Perkins, Pheme (eds.). The New Oxford Annotated Bible with the Apocryphal/Deuterocanonical Books: New Revised Standard Version, Issue 48 (Augmented 3rd ed.). Oxford University Press. ISBN 978-0195288810.
- Dietrich, Walter (2007). "13. 1 and 2 Kings". In Barton, John; Muddiman, John (eds.). The Oxford Bible Commentary (first (paperback) ed.). Oxford University Press. pp. 232–266. ISBN 978-0199277186.
- Fitzmyer, Joseph A. (2008). A Guide to the Dead Sea Scrolls and Related Literature. Grand Rapids, MI: William B. Eerdmans Publishing Company. ISBN 9780802862419.
- Halley, Henry H. (1965). Halley's Bible Handbook: an abbreviated Bible commentary (24th (revised) ed.). Zondervan Publishing House. ISBN 0-310-25720-4.
- Hayes, Christine (2015). Introduction to the Bible. Yale University Press. ISBN 978-0300188271.
- Leithart, Peter J. (2006). 1 & 2 Kings. Brazos Theological Commentary on the Bible. Brazos Press. ISBN 978-1587431258.
- McFall, Leslie (1991), "Translation Guide to the Chronological Data in Kings and Chronicles" (PDF), Bibliotheca Sacra, 148: 3-45, archived from the original (PDF) on 2010-08-27
- McKane, William (1993). "Kings, Book of". In Metzger, Bruce M; Coogan, Michael D (eds.). The Oxford Companion to the Bible. Oxford University Press. pp. 409–413. ISBN 978-0195046458.
- Metzger, Bruce M; Coogan, Michael D, eds. (1993). The Oxford Companion to the Bible. Oxford University Press. ISBN 978-0195046458.
- Thiele, Edwin R. (1983). The Mysterious Numbers of the Hebrew Kings (3rd ed.). Grand Rapids, Michigan: Zondervan. ISBN 978-0-310-36010-0.
- Ulrich, Eugene, ed. (2010). The Biblical Qumran Scrolls: Transcriptions and Textual Variants. Brill.
- Würthwein, Ernst (1995). The Text of the Old Testament. Translated by Rhodes, Erroll F. Grand Rapids, MI: Wm. B. Eerdmans. ISBN 0-8028-0788-7.
