= 2 Chronicles 15 =

Second Book of Chronicles, chapter 15

- ← chapter 14 chapter 16 →
- The complete Hebrew text of the Books of Chronicles (1st and 2nd Chronicles) in the Leningrad Codex (1008 CE).
- Book: Books of Chronicles
- Category: Ketuvim
- Christian Bible part: Old Testament
- Order in the Christian part: 14

2 Chronicles 15 is the fifteenth chapter of the Second Book of Chronicles the Old Testament in the Christian Bible or of the second part of the Books of Chronicles in the Hebrew Bible. The book is compiled from older sources by an unknown person or group, designated by modern scholars as "the Chronicler", and had the final shape established in late fifth or fourth century BCE. This chapter belongs to the section focusing on the kingdom of Judah until its destruction by the Babylonians under Nebuchadnezzar and the beginning of restoration under Cyrus the Great of Persia (2 Chronicles 10 to 36). The focus of this chapter is the reign of Asa, king of Judah.

== Text ==
This chapter was originally written in the Hebrew language and is divided into 19 verses.

=== Textual witnesses ===
Some early manuscripts containing the text of this chapter in Hebrew are of the Masoretic Text tradition, which includes the Aleppo Codex (10th century), and Codex Leningradensis (1008).

There is also a translation into Koine Greek known as the Septuagint, made in the last few centuries BCE. Extant ancient manuscripts of the Septuagint version include Codex Vaticanus (B; $\mathfrak{G}$^{B}; 4th century), and Codex Alexandrinus (A; $\mathfrak{G}$^{A}; 5th century). (Note: The whole book of 2 Chronicles is missing from the extant Codex Sinaiticus.)

=== Old Testament references ===
- 2 Chronicles 15:8–19: 1 Kings 15:9–15

== The prophecy of Azariah (15:1–7) ==
The section records Azariah's speech, which can be divided into three parts (after the introduction):

- (1) principles (verse 2)
- (2) a historical retrospect (verses 3–6)
- (3) consequences for the future (verse 7).

The speech's introduction addresses a broad audience: king Asa, people of Judah, and of Benjamin (excluding the Israelites from the northern kingdom). Verse 2 speaks of the reciprocity principles in divine-human relations "The Lord is with you, while you are with him", corollary of the 'measure-for-measure' principle spoken by Shemaiah in 2 Chronicles 12:5. The historical parts could refer to the judges period (cf. e.g. Judges 2:11-14; 17:6) or to a midrash-like reworking of Hosea 3:4. Azariah's speech concluded with a 'call for courageous deeds', patterned after Jeremiah 31:16: 'For your work shall be rewarded'.

=== Verse 1 ===
And the Spirit of God came upon Azariah the son of Oded:

- "Came" or "was", as found in 2 Chronicles 20:14, where the Spirit of "the Lord" (יְהוָה) is used instead of "God" (אְלֶהִים), and in 2 Chronicles 24:20 with the word "God" and the verb "clothed" (לָבְשָׁה).

== Asa’s reforms (15:8–19) ==
Asa responded immediately to Azariah's sermon by carrying out religious reforms, and then initiated a great assembly (modelled on 2 Kings 23) to establish a covenant renewal (cf. Exodus 19:3–8), accompanied with a joyful and enthusiastic sacrificial ceremony. The general assembly (verse 9) not only included the people of Judah and Benjamin, but also those from the northern kingdom who were regarded as 'strangers' from the Chronicler's perspective, from the tribes Ephraim, Manasseh, and Simeon (cf. 2 Chronicles 34:6). The "third month" points to the date of "the Sinai theophany" and the "Feast of Weeks" (Shavuot or Pentecost) with sacrifices based on the number "seven" (seven hundred...seven thousand) to link with that particular feast (seven times seven).

=== Verse 8 ===
And when Asa heard these words, and the prophecy of Oded the prophet, he took courage, and put away the abominable idols out of all the land of Judah and Benjamin, and out of the cities which he had taken from mount Ephraim, and renewed the altar of the Lord, that was before the porch of the Lord.

- "Oded": following Masoretic Text. The Greek Septuagint, Syriac and Latin Vulgate versions have "Azariah the son of Oded" (cf. verse 1).
- "Abominable idols": an expression only used here in the Chronicles, although the term was found in several places in the books of Kings.
- "The cities which he had taken in from mount Ephraim"': may refer to Geba and Mizpah (in

the vicinity of the mountains of Ephraim; cf 2 Chronicles 16:6), which Asa built after his war with Baasha or even to his father Abijah's conquest (2 Chronicles 13:19).

- "Renewed the altar of the Lord': is a measure marking the resumption of ordered worship life (cf. Ezra 3:2–3).

=== Verse 10 ===
So they gathered together at Jerusalem in the third month, in the fifteenth year of the reign of Asa.

- "The fifteenth year": in Thiele's chronology falls between September 896 and September 895 BCE.

=== Verse 19 ===
And there was no war until the thirty-fifth year of the reign of Asa.

- "The thirty-fifth year": Thiele understood that the year here refers not to Asa's personal rule but to the duration of the kingdom of Judah (cf. the "20th year of Artaxerxes", 445 BCE, in Nehemiah 2:1 was calculated from the beginning of Xerxes' reign in 465 BCE). The Chronicler placed the invasions in a correct chronology after the rest in the first 10 years of Asa's rule (from 910 to 900 BCE), starting with the attack of the Cushites and the Lubim (but no war with Israel as yet) just before the third month of Asa's 15th year (between September 896 and September 895 BCE), which ended with a victory celebration of Judah. This caused a migration of people from the northern kingdom to the south, that Baasha's invasion attempted to halt. 1 Kings 15:33 notes that Baasha became the king of Israel on the third year of Asa's reign (909/908 BCE) and ruled for 24 years (until 886/885 BCE), thus only until the 26th year of Asa (1 Kings 16:8). Therefore, it shows that the 15th year of Asa was also the 35th year from the Division.

== See also ==
- Jerusalem
- Kidron Valley
- Maacah
- Tabernacle
- Related Bible parts: Exodus 19, Judges 2, 1 Kings 15, 1 Chronicles 6, 1 Chronicles 18, 1 Chronicles 22, 1 Chronicles 29, 2 Chronicles 6, 2 Chronicles 13, 2 Chronicles 34, Ezra 3

== Sources ==
- Ackroyd, Peter R (1993). "Chronicles, Books of". In Metzger, Bruce M; Coogan, Michael D (eds.). The Oxford Companion to the Bible. Oxford University Press. pp. 113–116. ISBN 978-0195046458.
- Bennett, William (2018). The Expositor's Bible: The Books of Chronicles. Litres. ISBN 978-5040825196.
- Coogan, Michael David (2007). Coogan, Michael David; Brettler, Marc Zvi; Newsom, Carol Ann; Perkins, Pheme (eds.). The New Oxford Annotated Bible with the Apocryphal/Deuterocanonical Books: New Revised Standard Version, Issue 48 (Augmented 3rd ed.). Oxford University Press. ISBN 9780195288810.
- Mabie, Frederick (2017). "I. The Chronicler's Genealogical Survey of All Israel". In Longman III, Tremper; Garland, David E (eds.). 1 and 2 Chronicles. The Expositor's Bible Commentary. Zondervan. pp. 267–308. ISBN 978-0310531814.
- Mathys, H. P. (2007). "14. 1 and 2 Chronicles". In Barton, John; Muddiman, John (eds.). The Oxford Bible Commentary (first (paperback) ed.). Oxford University Press. pp. 267–308. ISBN 978-0199277186.
- McFall, Leslie (1991), "Translation Guide to the Chronological Data in Kings and Chronicles" (PDF), Bibliotheca Sacra, 148: 3–45, archived from the original (PDF) on 2010-08-27
- Thiele, Edwin R. (1983). The Mysterious Numbers of the Hebrew Kings (3rd ed.). Grand Rapids, Michigan: Zondervan. ISBN 978-0-310-36010-0.
- Würthwein, Ernst (1995). The Text of the Old Testament. Translated by Rhodes, Erroll F. Grand Rapids, MI: William B. Eerdmans. ISBN 0-8028-0788-7.
