= 2 Chronicles 21 =

Second Book of Chronicles, chapter 21

- ← chapter 20 chapter 22 →
- The complete Hebrew text of the Books of Chronicles (1st and 2nd Chronicles) in the Leningrad Codex (1008 CE).
- Book: Books of Chronicles
- Category: Ketuvim
- Christian Bible part: Old Testament
- Order in the Christian part: 14

2 Chronicles 21 is the twenty-first chapter of the Second Book of Chronicles the Old Testament in the Christian Bible or of the second part of the Books of Chronicles in the Hebrew Bible. The book is compiled from older sources by an unknown person or group, designated by modern scholars as "the Chronicler", and had the final shape established in late fifth or fourth century BCE. This chapter belongs to the section focusing on the kingdom of Judah until its destruction by the Babylonians under Nebuchadnezzar and the beginning of restoration under Cyrus the Great of Persia (2 Chronicles 10 to 36). The focus of this chapter is the reign of Jehoram, king of Judah.

== Text ==
This chapter was originally written in the Hebrew language and is divided into 20 verses.

=== Textual witnesses ===
Some early manuscripts containing the text of this chapter in Hebrew are of the Masoretic Text tradition, which includes the Aleppo Codex (10th century), and Codex Leningradensis (1008).

There is also a translation into Koine Greek known as the Septuagint, made in the last few centuries BCE. Extant ancient manuscripts of the Septuagint version include Codex Vaticanus (B; $\mathfrak{G}$^{B}; 4th century), and Codex Alexandrinus (A; $\mathfrak{G}$^{A}; 5th century). (Note: The whole book of 2 Chronicles is missing from the extant Codex Sinaiticus.)

=== Old Testament references ===
- 2 Chronicles 21:1–7: 2 Kings 8:16–19
- 2 Chronicles 21:8–11: 2 Kings 8:20–24

== Jehoram, king of Judah (21:1–7) ==
This section contains the record of Jehoram's reign, but uniquely also has the records of the king's brothers (verses 2–4), which only occurs with David's family in Kings or Chronicles. As soon as Jehoram had established his power, he brutally murdered all his brothers, who were in charge of fortified cities, and several notables, most likely driven by his lust for control or fear of losing it. However, the divine wrath was restrained for the kingdom, because of the promise to David (1 Chronicles 17:1–15; cf. 2 Kings 8:17–19).

=== Verse 5 ===
Jehoram was thirty-two years old when he became king, and he reigned eight years in Jerusalem.

- Cross references: 2 Kings 8:17; 2 Chronicles 21:20
- "Eight years": based on Thiele-McFall calculation, Jehoram of Judah reigned from between April and September 848 BCE until his death between April and September 841 BCE. Unlike with his predecessors, Jehoram's reign is counted using the 'non-accession year method', which is commonly used only by the kings of the northern kingdom.

== Edom and Libnah Rebel (21:8–11) ==
The text provides unclear description whether Jehoram managed to defeat the Edomites, only to state that Edom and Libnah successfully revolted against the kingdom of Judah (verse 10), which should give ample warning to Jehoram to repent from his sins, but instead he continued to establish idol worship in Judah.

== Elijah’s Letter to Jehoram (21:12–15) ==
In Jehoram's regnal record, there was not a single prophet appearing in flesh and blood, and the prophetic warning only came in a letter sent by Elijah, who was active in the northern kingdom. Elijah's threats of divine punishment for Jehoram (verses 14–15) were all fulfilled and fell on Jehoram's people, family, property and own body (verses 16–19).

== Death of Jehoram (21:16–20) ==
The punishment for Jehoram came from the south-western neighbors of the kingdom ("the Arabs who are near the Ethiopians"; cf. 2 Chronicles 14:9), and left with only the youngest son of Jehoram, the Davidic line was on the brink of total eradication. The Chronicler extensively describes Jehoram's final punishment in the form of a painful, incurable, yet indefinable sickness (probably a stomach ulcer leading to a chronic rectal prolapse).

=== Verse 20 ===
He was thirty-two when he began to reign, and he reigned eight years in Jerusalem. And he departed with no one’s regret. They buried him in the City of David, but not in the tombs of the kings.

- Cross references: 2 Kings 8:17; 2 Chronicles 21:5

The repetition of Jehoram's age and length of reign (cf. verse 5) indicates a transcription from another source.

- "Departed with no one’s regret": or "departed without being desired" in KJV, is rendered in Septuagint as ἐπορεύθη οὐκ ἐν ἐπαίνῳ, "he walked without praise".

== See also ==
- Ahab
- Arabians
- Ethiopians
- Edom
- Elijah
- Jehoahaz
- Jehoshaphat
- Jerusalem
- Libnah
- Philistines
- Related Bible parts: 1 Kings 3, 1 Kings 22, 2 Kings 8, 2 Chronicles 16, 2 Chronicles 17

== Sources ==
- Ackroyd, Peter R (1993). "Chronicles, Books of". In Metzger, Bruce M; Coogan, Michael D (eds.). The Oxford Companion to the Bible. Oxford University Press. pp. 113–116. ISBN 978-0195046458.
- Bennett, William (2018). The Expositor's Bible: The Books of Chronicles. Litres. ISBN 978-5040825196.
- Coogan, Michael David (2007). Coogan, Michael David; Brettler, Marc Zvi; Newsom, Carol Ann; Perkins, Pheme (eds.). The New Oxford Annotated Bible with the Apocryphal/Deuterocanonical Books: New Revised Standard Version, Issue 48 (Augmented 3rd ed.). Oxford University Press. ISBN 9780195288810.
- Mabie, Frederick (2017). "I. The Chronicler's Genealogical Survey of All Israel". In Longman III, Tremper; Garland, David E (eds.). 1 and 2 Chronicles. The Expositor's Bible Commentary. Zondervan. pp. 267–308. ISBN 978-0310531814.
- Mathys, H. P. (2007). "14. 1 and 2 Chronicles". In Barton, John; Muddiman, John (eds.). The Oxford Bible Commentary (first (paperback) ed.). Oxford University Press. pp. 267–308. ISBN 978-0199277186.
- McFall, Leslie (1991), "Translation Guide to the Chronological Data in Kings and Chronicles" (PDF), Bibliotheca Sacra, 148: 3-45, archived from the original (PDF) on 2010-08-27
- Thiele, Edwin R. (1983). The Mysterious Numbers of the Hebrew Kings (3rd ed.). Grand Rapids, Michigan: Zondervan. ISBN 978-0-310-36010-0.
- Würthwein, Ernst (1995). The Text of the Old Testament. Translated by Rhodes, Erroll F. Grand Rapids, MI: William B. Eerdmans. ISBN 0-8028-0788-7.
