= 2 Chronicles 13 =

Second Book of Chronicles, chapter 13

- ← chapter 12 chapter 14 →
- The complete Hebrew text of the Books of Chronicles (1st and 2nd Chronicles) in the Leningrad Codex (1008 CE).
- Book: Books of Chronicles
- Category: Ketuvim
- Christian Bible part: Old Testament
- Order in the Christian part: 14

2 Chronicles 13 is the thirteenth chapter of the Second Book of Chronicles the Old Testament in the Christian Bible or of the second part of the Books of Chronicles in the Hebrew Bible. The book is compiled from older sources by an unknown person or group, designated by modern scholars as "the Chronicler", and had the final shape established in late fifth or fourth century BCE. This chapter belongs to the section focusing on the kingdom of Judah until its destruction by the Babylonians under Nebuchadnezzar and the beginning of restoration under Cyrus the Great of Persia (2 Chronicles 10 to 36). The focus of this chapter is the reign of Abijah, king of Judah.

== Text ==
This chapter was originally written in the Hebrew language and is divided into 22 verses in Christian Bibles, but 23 verses in the Hebrew Bible with the following verse numbering comparison:

Verse numbering for 2 Chronicles 13 and 14
English	Hebrew
14:1	13:23
14:2-15	14:1-14

This article generally follows the common numbering in Christian English Bible versions, with notes to the numbering in Hebrew Bible versions.

=== Textual witnesses ===
Some early manuscripts containing the text of this chapter in Hebrew are of the Masoretic Text tradition, which includes the Aleppo Codex (10th century), and Codex Leningradensis (1008).

There is also a translation into Koine Greek known as the Septuagint, made in the last few centuries BCE. Extant ancient manuscripts of the Septuagint version include Codex Vaticanus (B; $\mathfrak{G}$^{B}; 4th century), and Codex Alexandrinus (A; $\mathfrak{G}$^{A}; 5th century). (Note: The whole book of 2 Chronicles is missing from the extant Codex Sinaiticus.)

=== Old Testament references ===
- 2 Chronicles 13:1–3: 1 Kings 15:1–8

== Abijah king of Judah (13:1–2) ==
The information about Abijah's reign over Judah contains no judgement (unlike the negative judgement in 1 Kings), which is otherwise only given to Jehoahaz (2 Chronicles 36:1–4), and a report of his (one and only) victory over Jeroboam (not recorded in 1 Kings), preceded by a sermon on the mount which portrays the basic relationship between the northern and southern kingdoms.

=== Verse 1 ===
In the eighteenth year of King Jeroboam, Abijah became king over Judah.

- Parallel: 1 Kings 15:1
- "In the eighteenth year of King Jeroboam": in Thiele's chronology, Abijah became king between April and September 913 BCE, at an unknown age. This is the only recorded synchronism with the northern kingdom in the Chronicles.
- Abijah: spelled as "Abijam" in 1 Kings 15:1 (following Masoretic Text; LXX has Ἀβιού corresponding to "Abijahu").

=== Verse 2 ===
He reigned three years in Jerusalem. His mother’s name was Michaiah the daughter of Uriel of Gibeah.
And there was war between Abijah and Jeroboam.

- Parallel: 1 Kings 15:2
- "He reigned three years": In Thiele's chronology, Abijah started to reign between April and September 913 BCE, then died between September 911 and April 910 BCE, at an unknown age.
- "Michaiah": spelled following Masoretic Text. In Greek Septuagint, Syriac dan Arabic versions, it is spelled as "Maachah" as in 1 Kings 15:2 (cf. 2 Chronicles 15:16). 2 Chronicles 11:20 states that Abijah was born of "Maachah the daughter of Absalom". The word "daughter" in Hebrew may also stand for "granddaughter". Josephus notes that Maachah was the daughter of Tamar, the only daughter of Absalom (2 Samuel 14:27), so "Uriel of Gibeah" must have been the husband of Tamar.

== War between Abijah and Jeroboam (13:3–22) ==
This section consists of preparations for war, a lengthy speech, and the description of an actual battle between the army of Abijah (kingdom of Judah) and that of Jeroboam (northern kingdom of Israel). Abijah's army (400,000 'valiant warriors ... picked men') was only half the size of Jeroboam's (800,000 'picked mighty warriors'—a number corresponding to 2 Samuel 24:9 and David's census), suggesting that on human terms, northern Israel should be victorious. Still, Abijah made a 'stylistically and rhetorically artistic speech' (verses 5–12), calling on the people of the northern kingdom to return to the legitimate rule of the David's line (YHWH's elect), the legitimate office of priesthood in Jerusalem, and the legitimate (and pure) worship in the temple of Jerusalem, from the idolatrous worship of Jeroboam with his own priests serving that of 'no gods' (לא אלהים, lo elohim; cf. Hosea 8:6). The 'enumeration of Judean orthopraxis' by Abijah describes the Temple worship during the period of United Monarchy (1 Chronicles 15–16; 23–29; 2 Chronicles 2–4) with reference to the tabernacle worship at the time of Moses (Exodus 25:30-40; 29:1-9, 38-42; 30:7-10; Leviticus 24:3-9; Numbers 8:2-4; 28:3-8). The battle had the elements of tactics by the Israelites, who prepared an ambush, and the holy warfare by the Judeans, for whom the Lord acted to strike down Jeroboam's troops, enabling the Judeans to kill 500,000 chosen men of Israel (verses 16–17).

=== Verse 4 ===
Then Abijah stood on Mount Zemaraim, which is in the mountains of Ephraim, and said, “Hear me, Jeroboam and all Israel:

- "Mount Zemaraim": not mentioned elsewhere, presumably a mountain or hill near the borders of Benjamin and Ephraim, above the place called Zemaraim (Joshua 18:22) in Benjamin's territory, mentioned between the places called Beth ha-Arabah (in the Jordan valley) and Bethel. The mountains of Ephraim runs from the Plain of Esdraelon, through the midst of the area later called Samaria, to the territory of Judah.

=== Verse 22 ===
And the rest of the acts of Abijah, and his ways, and his sayings, are written in the story of the prophet Iddo.

- "Story": from Hebrew: midrash, a term that is repeated only once in the Hebrew Bible (2 Chronicles 24:27; cf. Sirach 51:23), can also be translated as "exposition, study, commentary". 2 Chronicles 9:29 and 12:15 also refer to the prophet Iddo.

== See also ==
- Bethel
- Jeroboam
- Jerusalem
- Rehoboam
- Related Bible parts: Exodus 25; Exodus 29; Exodus 30; Leviticus 24; Numbers 8; 1 Kings 1, 1 Kings 10, 1 Kings 11, 1 Kings 12, 1 Kings 14, 1 Chronicles 6, 1 Chronicles 18, 1 Chronicles 22, 1 Chronicles 29

== Sources ==
- Ackroyd, Peter R (1993). "Chronicles, Books of". In Metzger, Bruce M; Coogan, Michael D (eds.). The Oxford Companion to the Bible. Oxford University Press. pp. 113–116. ISBN 978-0195046458.
- Bennett, William (2018). The Expositor's Bible: The Books of Chronicles. Litres. ISBN 978-5040825196.
- Coogan, Michael David (2007). Coogan, Michael David; Brettler, Marc Zvi; Newsom, Carol Ann; Perkins, Pheme (eds.). The New Oxford Annotated Bible with the Apocryphal/Deuterocanonical Books: New Revised Standard Version, Issue 48 (Augmented 3rd ed.). Oxford University Press. ISBN 9780195288810.
- Mabie, Frederick (2017). "I. The Chronicler's Genealogical Survey of All Israel". In Longman III, Tremper; Garland, David E (eds.). 1 and 2 Chronicles. The Expositor's Bible Commentary. Zondervan. pp. 267–308. ISBN 978-0310531814.
- Mathys, H. P. (2007). "14. 1 and 2 Chronicles". In Barton, John; Muddiman, John (eds.). The Oxford Bible Commentary (first (paperback) ed.). Oxford University Press. pp. 267–308. ISBN 978-0199277186.
- McFall, Leslie (1991), "Translation Guide to the Chronological Data in Kings and Chronicles" (PDF), Bibliotheca Sacra, 148: 3-45, archived from the original (PDF) on 2010-08-27
- Thiele, Edwin R. (1983). The Mysterious Numbers of the Hebrew Kings (3rd ed.). Grand Rapids, Michigan: Zondervan. ISBN 978-0-310-36010-0.
- Würthwein, Ernst (1995). The Text of the Old Testament. Translated by Rhodes, Erroll F. Grand Rapids, MI: William B. Eerdmans. ISBN 0-8028-0788-7.
