= 1 Kings 16 =

1 Kings, chapter 16

- ← chapter 15 chapter 17 →
- The pages containing the Books of Kings (1 & 2 Kings) Leningrad Codex (1008 CE).
- Book: First book of Kings
- Hebrew Bible part: Nevi'im
- Order in the Hebrew part: 4
- Category: Former Prophets
- Christian Bible part: Old Testament
- Order in the Christian part: 11

1 Kings 16 is the sixteenth chapter of the Books of Kings in the Hebrew Bible or the First Book of Kings in the Old Testament of the Christian Bible. The book is a compilation of various annals recording the acts of the kings of Israel and Judah by a Deuteronomic compiler in the seventh century BCE, with a supplement added in the sixth century BCE. 1 Kings 12:1-16:14 documents the consolidation of the kingdoms of northern Israel and Judah. This chapter focusses on the reigns of Baasha, Elah, Zimri, Omri and Ahab in the northern kingdom during the reign of Asa in the southern kingdom.

== Text ==
This chapter was originally written in the Hebrew language and since the 16th century is divided into 34 verses.

=== Textual witnesses ===
Some early manuscripts containing the text of this chapter in Hebrew are of the Masoretic Text tradition, which includes the Codex Cairensis (895), Aleppo Codex (10th century), and Codex Leningradensis (1008).

There is also a translation into Koine Greek known as the Septuagint, made in the last few centuries BCE. Extant ancient manuscripts of the Septuagint version include Codex Vaticanus (B; $\mathfrak{G}$^{B}; 4th century) and Codex Alexandrinus (A; $\mathfrak{G}$^{A}; 5th century). (Note: The whole book of 1 Kings is missing from the extant Codex Sinaiticus.) A long addition is found in the Septuagint of Codex Vaticanus following 1 Kings 16:28 (numbered as verses 28a–28h).

== End of reign of Baasha, the king of Israel (16:1–7) ==
Baasha was 'walking in the way of Jeroboam', left the bull cult of Bethel (and Dan) intact, although he had eliminated the Jeroboam dynasty, so a prophet, Jehu ben Hanani, confronted him and gave him a warning and a scolding (verses 2–4) very similar to that of Ahijah of Shiloh (1 Kings 14:7–11), resulting in parallels of fates befallen Baasha's and Jeroboam's dynasties.

== Elah, the king of Israel (16:8–14) ==
As happened with Jeroboam, the end of dynasty befell not during the reign of the founder of the dynasty, but of his son, very soon after his accession. Baasha's dynasty was eliminated on the second year of Elah, the son of Baasha, lasting no longer than Nadab, the son of Jeroboam. The assassin was Zimri a high-ranking officer, "commander of half the chariot troop" (a military form used in Israel since the time of Solomon, cf. 1 Kings 5:6,10:26; another officer of a chariot troop, Jehu, later also led a coup as recorded in 2 Kings 9). Zimri's butchery included not only Baasha's family but also family friends (verse 11).

=== Verse 8 ===
In the twenty and sixth year of Asa king of Judah began Elah the son of Baasha to reign over Israel in Tirzah, two years.

- "26th year of Asa...reign...two years": in Thiele's chronology (improved by McFall), Elah became king between September 886 and April 885 BCE and died between September 885 and April 884 BCE (his age was omitted).

=== Verse 14 ===
Now the rest of the acts of Elah, and all that he did, are they not written in the book of the chronicles of the kings of Israel?

== Zimri, the king of Israel (16:15–20) ==
Zimri was 'the most spectacularly unsuccessful king of all' rulers in Israel and Judah as his suicide ended his seven-day reign. While still in war with the Philistines, the Israel army resented the coup in its capital, and as a chariot officer, Zimri likely 'represented the urban, Canaanite elements of the state too strongly for the army to tolerate', because it was dominated by more Israelite, tribal forces.

=== Verse 15 ===
In the twenty-seventh year of Asa king of Judah, Zimri reigned seven days in Tirzah. Now the troops were encamped against Gibbethon, which belonged to the Philistines.

- "27th year of Asa": in Thiele's chronology (improved by McFall), Zimri became king for 7 days until his death between September 885 and April 884 BCE (his age was omitted).

== Omri, the king of Israel (16:21–28) ==
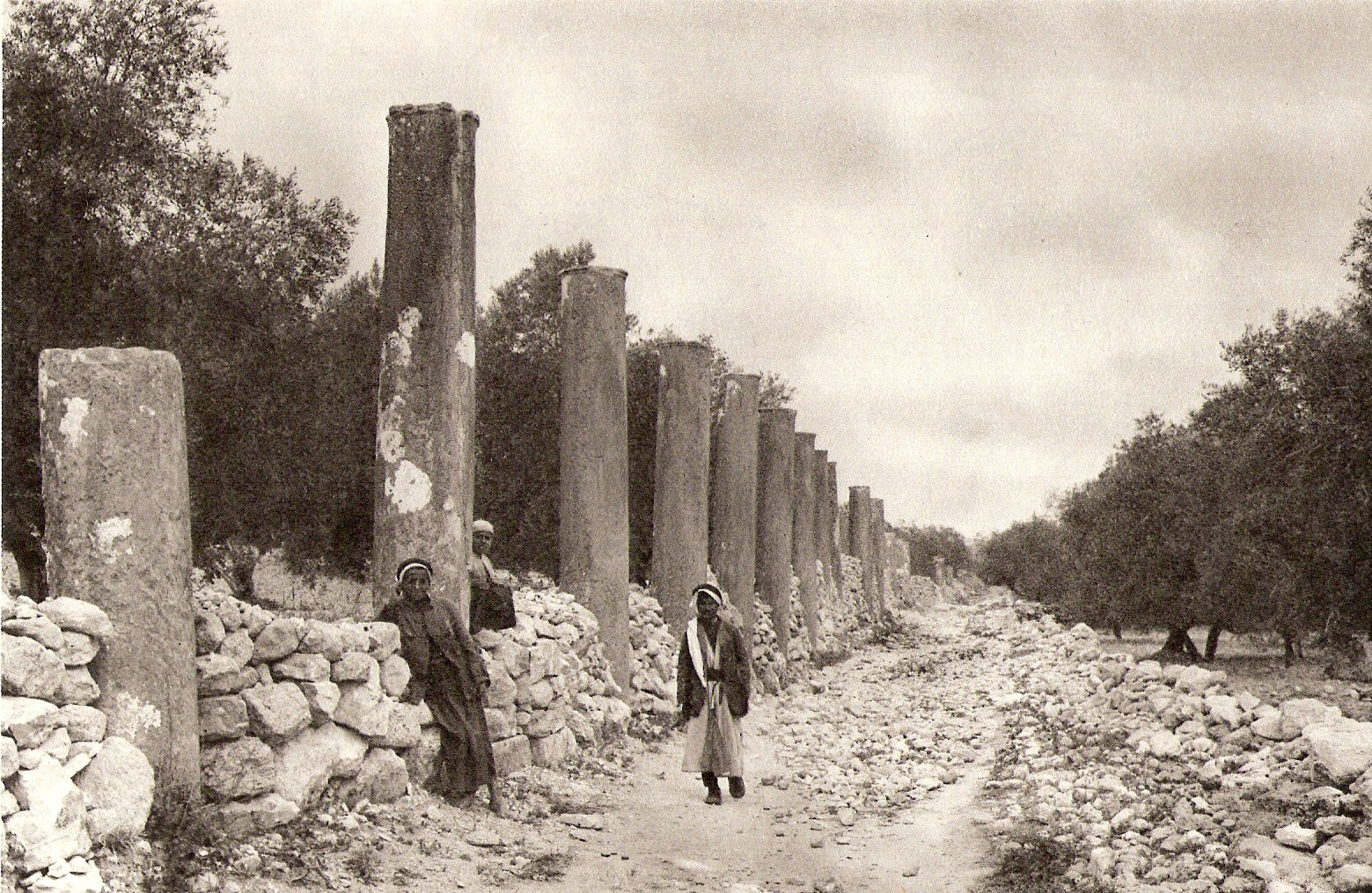
Ruins of the city of Samaria (1925)

The displeased army didn't recognize Zimri, as king, but instead, spontaneously hailed the army chief Omri as their leader to immediately marched and quickly seized the royal residence in Tirzah. Zimri set the citadel alight himself and died in the fire. Omri did not automatically become the sole ruler of Israel, because a certain Tibni was chosen as king by half of the people until his death four years later (cf the dates in 1 Kings 16:15 and 16:23). Omri's name was not of Israelite, but might be of Arabian origin; perhaps he worked his way to be an army general and then a head of state because of his 'unusually charismatic personality'. He founded a dynasty in northern Israel with great significance to the political development of the country, as possibly becoming the only true state at that time. Archaeological studies have discovered a great amount of building from the period of this dynasty (the ninth century BCE) across the entire land: city walls and fortifications, administration centres etc., whereas non-biblical sources from Assyria, Aram, and Moab indicate 'reluctant respect' for the power and influence of Israel at the time of Omri's dynasty (Assyrian records refer to Israel as "the land of the house of Omri"). By establishing a new capital city belonging to the crown, as David had done before him (cf. 2 Samuel 5), Omri's kingdom achieved a stability. Samaria (later Sebaste) was geopolitically and strategically well situated and could be built without taking larger, existing structures into account. It was equipped with a generous acropolis (about 180 x 90 meter in Omri's time to about 200 x 100 meter in Ahab's time), and created an opulent city in all respects (cf. Isaiah 28:1), which served as the royal residence of the Israelites until the destruction of the state. However, the kingdom became further away from Yahweh, so the prophets were increasingly brought to the foreground, especially Elijah and Elisha, who, despite being always loyal to Yahweh, became 'necessary counterparts' to and sometimes advisors of the Israelite kings, while setting the standards of what is important and right in Israel.

=== Verse 23 ===
In the thirty and first year of Asa king of Judah began Omri to reign over Israel, twelve years: six years reigned he in Tirzah.

- "31th year of Asa...reign...12 years": in Thiele's chronology (improved by McFall), Omri began to rule in a shared government of Israel with his rival, Tibni, between September 885 and April 884 BCE. Omri became sole ruler of Israel after the death of Tibni, which was between April and September 880 BCE, until his death between September 874 and April 873 BCE (his age was omitted).

=== Verse 24 ===
And he bought the hill Samaria of Shemer for two talents of silver, and built on the hill, and called the name of the city which he built, after the name of Shemer, owner of the hill, Samaria.

- "Two talents of silver": about 150 pounds (68 kg); a talent is about 75 pounds (34 kg).
- "Samaria": Hebrew: שֹׁמְרֽוֹן Shomeron.

== Ahab, the king of Israel (16:29–34) ==
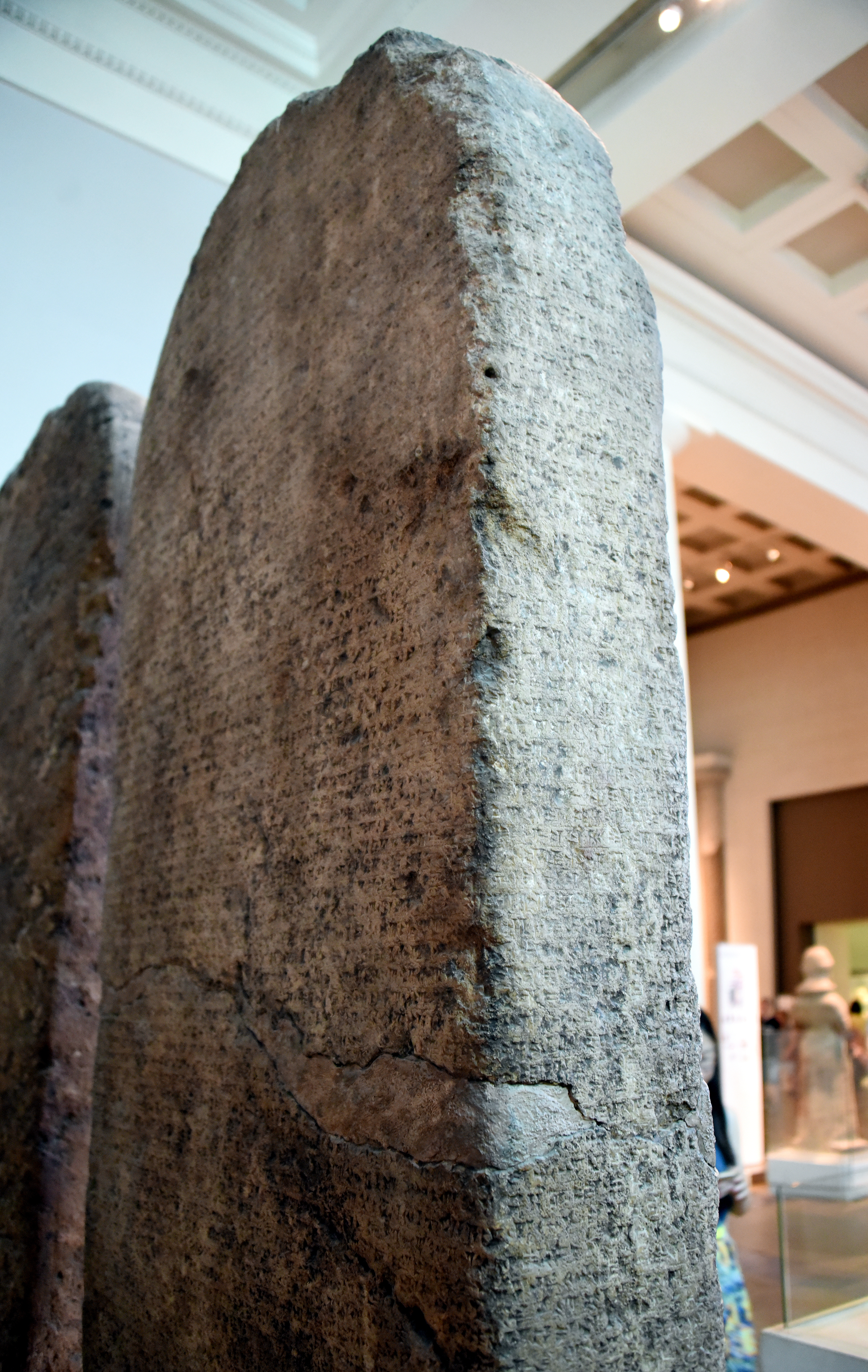
Kurkh stele of Shalmaneser III. The cuneiform inscription on the back mentions that "Ahab of Israel" was involved in the Battle of Qarqar in 853 BCE.

Ahab was considered as 'evil in the sight of the Lord more than all who were before him', especially as he married the Phoenician princess Jezebel, built a temple for Baal (the classic Canaanite fertility god, responsible for nature's rebirth) in Samaria, and erected a cult symbol for the goddess Asherah (the mother goddess of the Canaanite pantheon who stands at El's, Baal's, or even Yahweh's side, presumably symbolized by some wooden object such as a stylized tree). These could be the signs of Phoenician influence (cf. Jezebel's father's name: Ethbaal), although Ahab's action 'must have been driven by the need to appease the religious influence of Israel's urban Canaanite population', because Bethel and Dan were mainly Israelite Yahweh-worshipping sites (cf. 1 Kings 12:25–30). Archaeological studies discovered the 9th-century establishment in Jericho. Two sons of Hiel, who was responsible for the construction of Jericho, died during the building of it (they were not ritually killed), and this event was interpreted as an example of God's unambiguous word in form of Joshua's (prophetic) curse upon Jericho (Joshua 6:26).

=== Verse 29 ===
In the thirty-eighth year of Asa king of Judah, Ahab the son of Omri began to reign over Israel, and Ahab the son of Omri reigned over Israel in Samaria twenty-two years.

- "38th year of Asa...reigned over Israel... 22 years": in Thiele's chronology (improved by McFall), Ahab became king between September 874 and April 873 BCE and died between April and September 853 BCE. According to Thiele the Battle of Qarqar was fought in July/August 853 BCE as the annals of Shalmaneser III recorded (in "Shalmaneser III Stela") his fighting at Qarqar in his sixth year (853 BCE) and in his 18th year (841 BCE) he received tribute from Jehu (in "Black Obelisk"), so these 12 years accord exactly with Hebrew chronology and put the battle of Qarqar in Ahab's last year of reign and Jehu gave tribute to Shalmaneser in his first year.

=== Verse 34 ===
In his days Hiel of Bethel built Jericho. He laid its foundation at the cost of Abiram his firstborn, and set up its gates at the cost of his youngest son Segub, according to the word of the Lord, which he spoke by Joshua the son of Nun.

- "In his days": that is, "during Ahab’s reign".

In Joshua 6:26 it is written that Joshua pronounces a curse to anyone who dares to rebuild Jericho, which is grimly fulfilled in this verse, so the curse is viewed as a prophecy spoken by Yahweh through Joshua.

== See also ==
- Chronicles of the Kings of Israel
- Chronicles of the Kings of Judah
- David
- Gibbethon
- Idolatry
- Israel
- Jericho
- Jeroboam
- Jerusalem
- Kingdom of Judah
- Nadab, king of Israel
- Prophet
- Samaria
- Solomon's Temple
- Tibni
- Tirzah
- Related Bible parts: Joshua 6, 1 Kings 15, 2 Chronicles 17

== Sources ==
- Collins, John J. (2014). "Chapter 14: 1 Kings 12 – 2 Kings 25". Introduction to the Hebrew Scriptures. Fortress Press. pp. 277–296. ISBN 978-1451469233.
- Coogan, Michael David (2007). Coogan, Michael David; Brettler, Marc Zvi; Newsom, Carol Ann; Perkins, Pheme (eds.). The New Oxford Annotated Bible with the Apocryphal/Deuterocanonical Books: New Revised Standard Version, Issue 48 (Augmented 3rd ed.). Oxford University Press. ISBN 978-0195288810.
- Dietrich, Walter (2007). "13. 1 and 2 Kings". In Barton, John; Muddiman, John (eds.). The Oxford Bible Commentary (first (paperback) ed.). Oxford University Press. pp. 232–266. ISBN 978-0199277186.
- Halley, Henry H. (1965). Halley's Bible Handbook: an abbreviated Bible commentary (24th (revised) ed.). Zondervan Publishing House. ISBN 0-310-25720-4.
- Hayes, Christine (2015). Introduction to the Bible. Yale University Press. ISBN 978-0300188271.
- Leithart, Peter J. (2006). 1 & 2 Kings. Brazos Theological Commentary on the Bible. Brazos Press. ISBN 978-1587431258.
- McFall, Leslie (1991), "Translation Guide to the Chronological Data in Kings and Chronicles" (PDF), Bibliotheca Sacra, 148: 3–45, archived from the original (PDF) on 2010-08-27
- McKane, William (1993). "Kings, Book of". In Metzger, Bruce M; Coogan, Michael D (eds.). The Oxford Companion to the Bible. Oxford University Press. pp. 409–413. ISBN 978-0195046458.
- Metzger, Bruce M; Coogan, Michael D, eds. (1993). The Oxford Companion to the Bible. Oxford University Press. ISBN 978-0195046458.
- Thiele, Edwin R. (1983). The Mysterious Numbers of the Hebrew Kings (3rd ed.). Grand Rapids, Michigan: Zondervan. ISBN 978-0-310-36010-0.
- Tov, Emanuel (1999). "38. The Septuagint Additions ('Miscellanies') in 1 Kings 2 (3 Reigns 2)". The Greek and Hebrew Bible: Collected Essays on the Septuagint. Vetus Testamentum Supplements. Vol. 72. Leiden: Brill. pp. 549–573. doi:10.1163/9789004275973_039. ISBN 978-90-04-27597-3.
- Würthwein, Ernst (1995). The Text of the Old Testament. Translated by Rhodes, Erroll F. Grand Rapids, MI: Wm. B. Eerdmans. ISBN 0-8028-0788-7.
