= 2 Chronicles 17 =

Second Book of Chronicles, chapter 17

- ← chapter 16 chapter 18 →
- The complete Hebrew text of the Books of Chronicles (1st and 2nd Chronicles) in the Leningrad Codex (1008 CE).
- Book: Books of Chronicles
- Category: Ketuvim
- Christian Bible part: Old Testament
- Order in the Christian part: 14

2 Chronicles 17 is the seventeenth chapter of the Second Book of Chronicles the Old Testament in the Christian Bible or of the second part of the Books of Chronicles in the Hebrew Bible. The book is compiled from older sources by an unknown person or group, designated by modern scholars as "the Chronicler", and had the final shape established in late fifth or fourth century BCE. This chapter belongs to the section focusing on the kingdom of Judah until its destruction by the Babylonians under Nebuchadnezzar and the beginning of restoration under Cyrus the Great of Persia (2 Chronicles 10 to 36). The focus of this chapter (and the next ones until chapter 20) is the reign of Jehoshaphat, king of Judah.

== Text ==
This chapter was originally written in the Hebrew language and is divided into 19 verses.

=== Textual witnesses ===
Some early manuscripts containing the text of this chapter in Hebrew are of the Masoretic Text tradition, which includes the Aleppo Codex (10th century), and Codex Leningradensis (1008).

There is also a translation into Koine Greek known as the Septuagint, made in the last few centuries BCE. Extant ancient manuscripts of the Septuagint version include Codex Vaticanus (B; $\mathfrak{G}$^{B}; 4th century), and Codex Alexandrinus (A; $\mathfrak{G}$^{A}; 5th century). (Note: The whole book of 2 Chronicles is missing from the extant Codex Sinaiticus.)

=== Old Testament references ===
- 2 Chronicles 17:1–19: 1 Kings 15:23–24
- 2 Chronicles 17:1: 1 Kings 15:24
- 2 Chronicles 17:2: 2 Chronicles 11:5; 2 Chronicles 15:8
- 2 Chronicles 17:4: 1 Kings 12:28
- 2 Chronicles 17:5: 2 Chronicles 18:1
- 2 Chronicles 17:6: 2 Chronicles 14:2–3; 2 Chronicles 15:17
- 2 Chronicles 17:9: Deuteronomy 6:4–9; 17:18; 28:58,61; 29:21; 30:10; 31:24,26; Joshua 1:8; 8:31,34; 23:6; 24:26
- 2 Chronicles 17:10: 2 Chronicles 14:14

== Analysis ==
This chapter divides into three parts: two general judgements on Jehoshaphat's rule (17:1–6, 10–19) and one report on teaching the law to the people (17:7–9). The first judgement (verses 1–6) focuses on domestic politics and religion, wheres the second (verses 10–19) concerns with foreign and military policy. Both 1 Kings and 2 Chronicles commend his reign (1 Kings 22:43–44; 2 Chronicles 16:3–4; 20:32–33), but the Chronicles provide more information not recorded in 1 Kings.

== Jehoshaphat, king of Judah (17:1–6) ==
Jehoshaphat's reign was marked with peace, especially there were no conflicts with the northern kingdom (verse 1), drawing parallel with Solomon. Despite his successes as ruler—honored and wealthy (verse 5)—Jehoshaphat remained humble and God-fearing.

== Jehoshaphat’s educational plan (17:7–9) ==
The education of all people of Judah on the book of the law of the Lord (Deuteronomy 17:18–20; 2 Kings 22:8–13) was performed by the royal officers, Levites, and priests (in that particular order), reflecting the growing importance of the Torah teaching and the Levites as teachers in postexilic era (Ezra 7:25; Nehemiah 8).

=== Verse 7 ===
Also in the third year of his reign he sent to his princes, even to Benhail, and to Obadiah, and to Zechariah, and to Nethaneel, and to Michaiah, to teach in the cities of Judah.

- Cross references: 2 Chronicles 15:3; 2 Chronicles 35:3
- “The third year": in Thiele's chronology is between September 867 and 866 BCE. Jehoshaphat became coregent, while his father Asa became sick, in September 873 BCE and ruled alone as king between September 870 and April 869 BCE.
- "Benhail" means "son of power"

== Jehoshaphat’s military power (17:10–19) ==
This section contains a second summarizing description of Jehoshaphat's reign from the perspective of foreign and military policy, with all Judah and the lands around Judah were struck by fear of the Lord (verse 10) and paid tributes to the king (verse 11; cf. 2 Chronicles 27:5). The army's composition (verses 14–19) were closely linked with the construction of forts, differentiating between army divisions from Judah and Benjamin (less than Judah and equipped with light armour consisting of bows and shields).

== See also ==
- Ben-Hadad I
- Elijah
- Jehu (prophet)
- Tabernacle
- Related Bible parts: Deuteronomy 17, 2 Chronicles 14, 2 Chronicles 15, 2 Chronicles 21, Isaiah 7, Isaiah 10, Isaiah 31, Jeremiah 20, Zechariah 4

== Sources ==
- Ackroyd, Peter R (1993). "Chronicles, Books of". In Metzger, Bruce M; Coogan, Michael D (eds.). The Oxford Companion to the Bible. Oxford University Press. pp. 113–116. ISBN 978-0195046458.
- Bennett, William (2018). The Expositor's Bible: The Books of Chronicles. Litres. ISBN 978-5040825196.
- Coogan, Michael David (2007). Coogan, Michael David; Brettler, Marc Zvi; Newsom, Carol Ann; Perkins, Pheme (eds.). The New Oxford Annotated Bible with the Apocryphal/Deuterocanonical Books: New Revised Standard Version, Issue 48 (Augmented 3rd ed.). Oxford University Press. ISBN 9780195288810.
- Mabie, Frederick (2017). "I. The Chronicler's Genealogical Survey of All Israel". In Longman III, Tremper; Garland, David E (eds.). 1 and 2 Chronicles. The Expositor's Bible Commentary. Zondervan. pp. 267–308. ISBN 978-0310531814.
- Mathys, H. P. (2007). "14. 1 and 2 Chronicles". In Barton, John; Muddiman, John (eds.). The Oxford Bible Commentary (first (paperback) ed.). Oxford University Press. pp. 267–308. ISBN 978-0199277186.
- McFall, Leslie (1991), "Translation Guide to the Chronological Data in Kings and Chronicles" (PDF), Bibliotheca Sacra, 148: 3-45, archived from the original (PDF) on 2010-08-27
- Thiele, Edwin R. (1983). The Mysterious Numbers of the Hebrew Kings (3rd ed.). Grand Rapids, Michigan: Zondervan. ISBN 978-0-310-36010-0.
- Würthwein, Ernst (1995). The Text of the Old Testament. Translated by Rhodes, Erroll F. Grand Rapids, MI: William B. Eerdmans. ISBN 0-8028-0788-7.
