= 2 Chronicles 16 =

Second Book of Chronicles, chapter 16

- ← chapter 15 chapter 17 →
- The complete Hebrew text of the Books of Chronicles (1st and 2nd Chronicles) in the Leningrad Codex (1008 CE).
- Book: Books of Chronicles
- Category: Ketuvim
- Christian Bible part: Old Testament
- Order in the Christian part: 14

2 Chronicles 16 is the sixteenth chapter of the Second Book of Chronicles the Old Testament in the Christian Bible or of the second part of the Books of Chronicles in the Hebrew Bible. The book is compiled from older sources by an unknown person or group, designated by modern scholars as "the Chronicler", and had the final shape established in late fifth or fourth century BCE. This chapter belongs to the section focusing on the kingdom of Judah until its destruction by the Babylonians under Nebuchadnezzar and the beginning of restoration under Cyrus the Great of Persia (2 Chronicles 10 to 36). The focus of this chapter is the reign of Asa, king of Judah.

== Text ==
This chapter was originally written in the Hebrew language and is divided into 14 verses.

=== Textual witnesses ===
Some early manuscripts containing the text of this chapter in Hebrew are of the Masoretic Text tradition, which includes the Aleppo Codex (10th century), and Codex Leningradensis (1008).

There is also a translation into Koine Greek known as the Septuagint, made in the last few centuries BCE. Extant ancient manuscripts of the Septuagint version include Codex Vaticanus (B; $\mathfrak{G}$^{B}; 4th century), and Codex Alexandrinus (A; $\mathfrak{G}$^{A}; 5th century). (Note: The whole book of 2 Chronicles is missing from the extant Codex Sinaiticus.)

=== Old Testament references ===
- 2 Chronicles 16:1–6: 1 Kings 15:16–22

== War between Asa and Baasha (16:1–6) ==
The war against Baasha of Israel marks the second phase of Asa's reign when he behaved badly and was accordingly punished. During the first period Asa relied on God in battle and listened to God's prophet (Azariah), but in the second, he didn't rely on God but made alliance with Ben-hadad of Aram in his war and later ignored Hanani's sermon. As a consequence, throughout this last phase of his reign, Asa was always plagued by wars (cf. 1 Kings 15:16).

=== Verse 1 ===
In the thirty-sixth year of the reign of Asa, Baasha king of Israel came up against Judah and built Ramah, that he might let none go out or come in to Asa king of Judah.

- "The 36th year": In Thiele's chronology, this fell between September 895

to September 894 BCE. Thiele assumes that the year here refers not to Asa's personal rule but to the duration of the kingdom of Judah (cf. the "20th year of Artaxerxes", 445 BCE, in Nehemiah 2:1 was calculated from the beginning of Xerxes' reign in 465 BCE). The Chronicler placed the invasions in a correct chronology after the rest in the first 10 years of Asa's rule (from 910 to 900 BCE), starting with the attack of the Cushites and the Lubim (but no war with Israel as yet) just before the third month of Asa's 15th year (between September 896 and September 895 BCE), which ended with a victory celebration of Judah. This caused a migration of people from the northern kingdom to the south, that Baasha's invasion attempted to halt. 1 Kings 15:33 notes that Baasha became the king of Israel on the third year of Asa's reign (909/908 BCE) and ruled for 24 years (until 886/885 BCE), thus only until the 26th year of Asa (1 Kings 16:8). Therefore, the 36th year from the Division was also the 16th year of Asa.

- "Ramah" located 9 kilometres (5.6 mi) north of Jerusalem.

== Hanani’s message to Asa (16:7–10) ==
The short but strong speech of Hanani has the elements of three other prophets: the proclamation of Isaiah proclamation (verse 7; cf. Isaiah 7:9; 10:20; 31:1), the words of Zechariah (verse 9; cf. Zechariah 4:10), and the suffering of Jeremiah (verse 10; Jer 20:2–3).

=== Verse 7 ===
And at that time Hanani the seer came to King Asa of Judah saying, “Because you depended on the king of Aram and did not depend on the Lord your God, therefore the army of the king of Aram escaped from your hand.

- "Hanani the seer": the father of another seer, Jehu (1 Kings 16:1, 7; 2 Chronicles 19:2; 2 Chronicles 20:34).
- "Aram": or "Syria" (KJV, NKJV, ESV)

== Death of Asa (16:11–14) ==
The extensive concluding acknowledgement of Asa's reign with the unusual words of appreciation before the description of his burial indicates that his son Jehoshaphat had already taken on the business of government since Asa's illness rendered him unable to rule (verse 12). The sickness of Asa was seen as a punishment for his shameful behaviour towards Hanani the seer (1 Kings 15:23), in irony to the king's name which can be interpreted as "YHWH heals". Since the word "Asa" could also be derived from the Aramaic word for 'myrrh', the funeral pyre (cf. Jeremiah 34:5; 2 Chronicles 21:19) with the incense and the delicate spices shows that Asa was buried in 'a way that accorded with his name'.

=== Verse 12 ===
And in the thirty-ninth year of his reign, Asa became diseased in his feet, and his malady was severe; yet in his disease he did not seek the Lord, but the physicians.

- "The 39th year": in Thiele's chronology, this fell in 872/871 BCE.
- "Physicians" here reflect the 'folk-etymology' of Asa's name, which may also mean "healer".

=== Verse 13 ===
And Asa slept with his fathers, dying in the forty-first year of his reign.

- "The 41st year": in Thiele's chronology, this fell in 870/869 BCE.

== See also ==
- Ben-Hadad I
- Jehu (prophet)
- Jehoshaphat
- Tabernacle
- Related Bible parts: 2 Chronicles 14, 2 Chronicles 15, 2 Chronicles 21, Isaiah 7, Isaiah 10, Isaiah 31, Jeremiah 20, Zechariah 4

== Sources ==
- Ackroyd, Peter R (1993). "Chronicles, Books of". In Metzger, Bruce M; Coogan, Michael D (eds.). The Oxford Companion to the Bible. Oxford University Press. pp. 113–116. ISBN 978-0195046458.
- Bennett, William (2018). The Expositor's Bible: The Books of Chronicles. Litres. ISBN 978-5040825196.
- Coogan, Michael David (2007). Coogan, Michael David; Brettler, Marc Zvi; Newsom, Carol Ann; Perkins, Pheme (eds.). The New Oxford Annotated Bible with the Apocryphal/Deuterocanonical Books: New Revised Standard Version, Issue 48 (Augmented 3rd ed.). Oxford University Press. ISBN 9780195288810.
- Mabie, Frederick (2017). "I. The Chronicler's Genealogical Survey of All Israel". In Longman III, Tremper; Garland, David E (eds.). 1 and 2 Chronicles. The Expositor's Bible Commentary. Zondervan. pp. 267–308. ISBN 978-0310531814.
- Mathys, H. P. (2007). "14. 1 and 2 Chronicles". In Barton, John; Muddiman, John (eds.). The Oxford Bible Commentary (first (paperback) ed.). Oxford University Press. pp. 267–308. ISBN 978-0199277186.
- McFall, Leslie (1991), "Translation Guide to the Chronological Data in Kings and Chronicles" (PDF), Bibliotheca Sacra, 148: 3-45, archived from the original (PDF) on 2010-08-27
- Thiele, Edwin R. (1983). The Mysterious Numbers of the Hebrew Kings (3rd ed.). Grand Rapids, Michigan: Zondervan. ISBN 978-0-310-36010-0.
- Würthwein, Ernst (1995). The Text of the Old Testament. Translated by Rhodes, Erroll F. Grand Rapids, MI: William B. Eerdmans. ISBN 0-8028-0788-7.
