= Jahaziel =

Prophet in the Hebrew Bible

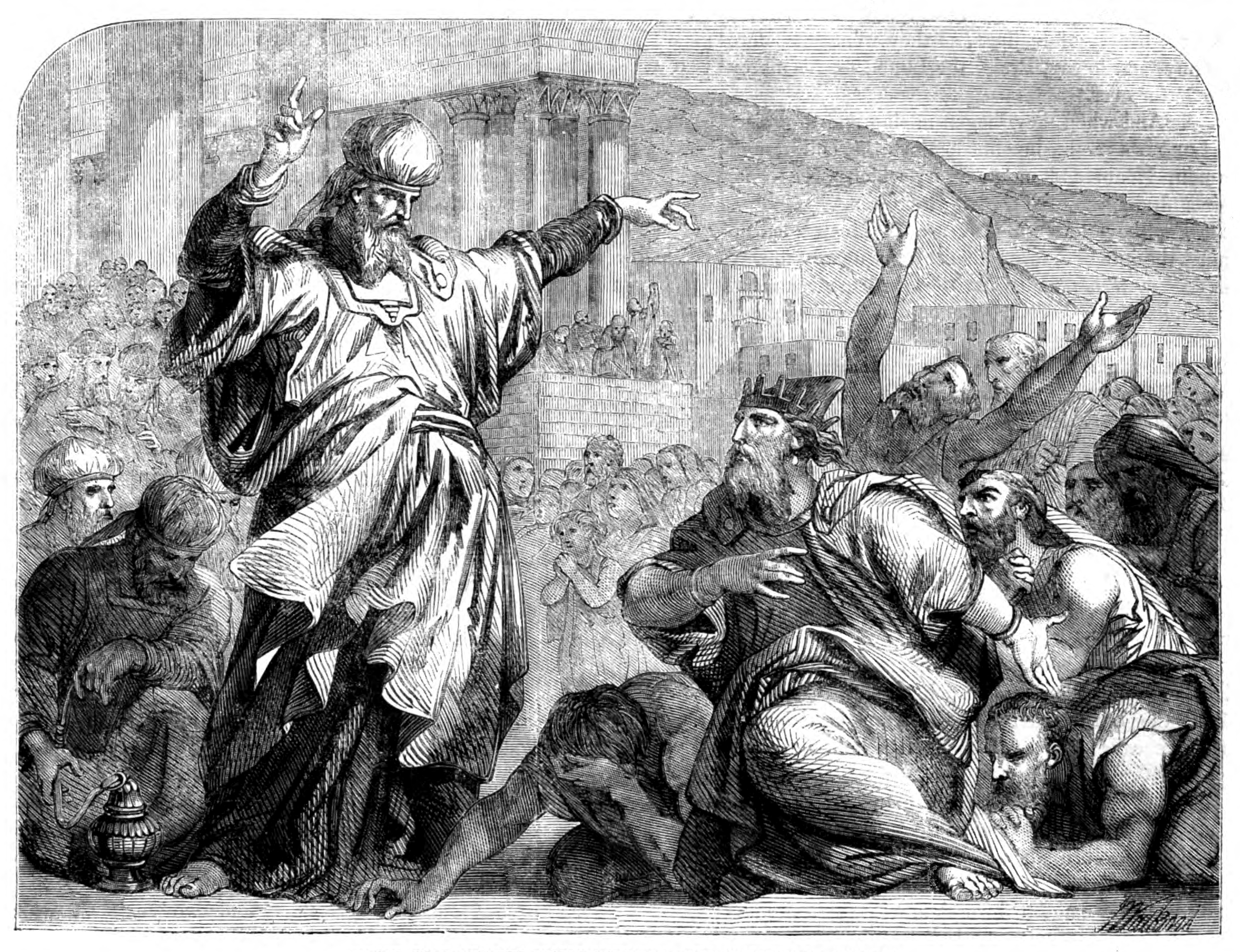
Jehoshaphat and the people mourning - the prophecy of Jahaziel

Jahaziel (Hebrew: יַחֲזִיאֵל Yaḥăzīʾēl) is the name of five characters mentioned in the Hebrew Bible. Jahaziel means "God sees" or "Yah looks". Four of the characters by this name are not credited with any independent action, but simply mentioned in passing as one of several priests (1 Chronicles 16:6, 23:19, 24:23; 2 Chronicles 20:14; Ezra 8:5) or a member in a list of warriors (1 Chronicles 12:4). However, one Jahaziel, a Levite, is mentioned as delivering a divine message.

== Jahaziel the Levite ==
2 Chronicles 20 recounts a joint attack on Judah by the nations of Moab, Ammon, and Edom in the time of King Jehoshaphat. The king declared a fast to the Lord and prayed for his help before the assembled nation.

"Then in the midst of the congregation the spirit of the Lord came upon Jahaziel son of Zechariah son of Benaiah son of Joel son of Mattaniah the Levite, of the sons of Asaph, and he said, 'Give heed, all Judah and the inhabitants of Jerusalem and King Jehoshaphat; thus said the Lord to you, "Do not fear or be dismayed by this great multitude, for the battle is God's, not yours . . ."'" (2 Chronicles 20:14–15, New Jewish Publication Society Bible).

The next morning, Jehoshaphat led his people out, calling them to have faith in the Lord, and leading them in praise. They saw their enemies turn on each other, and returned to Jerusalem in joy. After that the kingdom of Judah was at peace thanks to divine intervention against its enemies.
