= Maacah =

Personal name of several figures in the Bible

Maacah (or Maakah; Hebrew: מַעֲכָה Maʿăḵā, "crushed"; Maacha in the Codex Alexandrinus, Maachah in the KJV) is a non-gender-specific personal name used in the Bible to refer to a number of people.

- A child of Abraham's brother Nahor, son of Terah by his concubine Reumah. (Genesis 22:23,24)
- The wife of Machir, Manasseh's son. (1 Chronicles 7:15-16)
- One of the wives of Hezron's son Caleb. (1 Chronicles 2:48)
- A wife of David, and daughter of Talmai, King of Geshur (1 Chronicles 3:2), a near neighbor of the Maachathites. David fathered Absalom and Tamar by her.
- A King of Gath, to whose son, Achish, Shimei's servants fled early in Solomon's reign (1 Kings 2:39). About a half-century earlier than this event, David had fled to Achish, son of Maoch, King of Gath, with 600 men (1 Samuel 27:2). Still, the identification of Maacah is doubtful, though kinship is exceedingly probable.
- Granddaughter of Absalom, favorite wife of Rehoboam, mother of Abijah of Judah, and grandmother of Asa of Judah. She served as Gebirah for Asa until he deposed her for idolatry. (1 Kings 15:1-14, 2 Chronicles 11:20-22, 2 Chronicles 15:16)
- The wife of Yechiel. (1 Chronicles 8:29)
- The father of Hanan, who was a man in David's army. (1 Chronicles 11:43)
- The father of Shephatiah, an office man in David's time. (1 Chronicles 27:16)

The name is also used to refer to:

- Aram-Maʿakha, a small Aramean kingdom east of the Sea of Galilee in 1 Chronicles 19:6. Its territory was in the region assigned to the half-tribe of Manasseh east of the Jordan River. Maacah, its king, became a mercenary of the Ammonites in their war against David in 2 Samuel 10:6. It is probable that the city Abel-beth-maachah in Naphtali mentioned in 2 Samuel 10:15 derived its name from its relation to this kingdom and people.
