= Abijah of Judah =

Second King of Judah in the Hebrew Bible

Abijah
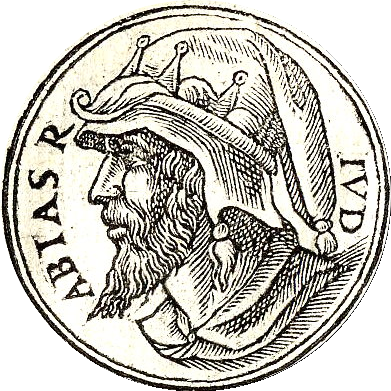
- Abijam from Guillaume Rouillé's Promptuarii Iconum Insigniorum, 1553

King of Judah
- Reign: c. 913 – 911 BCE
- Predecessor: Rehoboam
- Successor: Asa
- Born: c. 950 BCE; Jerusalem
- Died: 911 BCE possibly Jerusalem
- Burial: Jerusalem
- Spouse: 14 wives
- Issue: 22 sons and 16 daughters
- Hebrew name: אבים בן-רחבעם ’Aviyam ben Rehav’am
- House: House of David
- Father: Rehoboam
- Mother: Maacah, or Micaiah, daughter of Uriel of Gibeah, and granddaughter of Absalom
- Religion: Hebrew

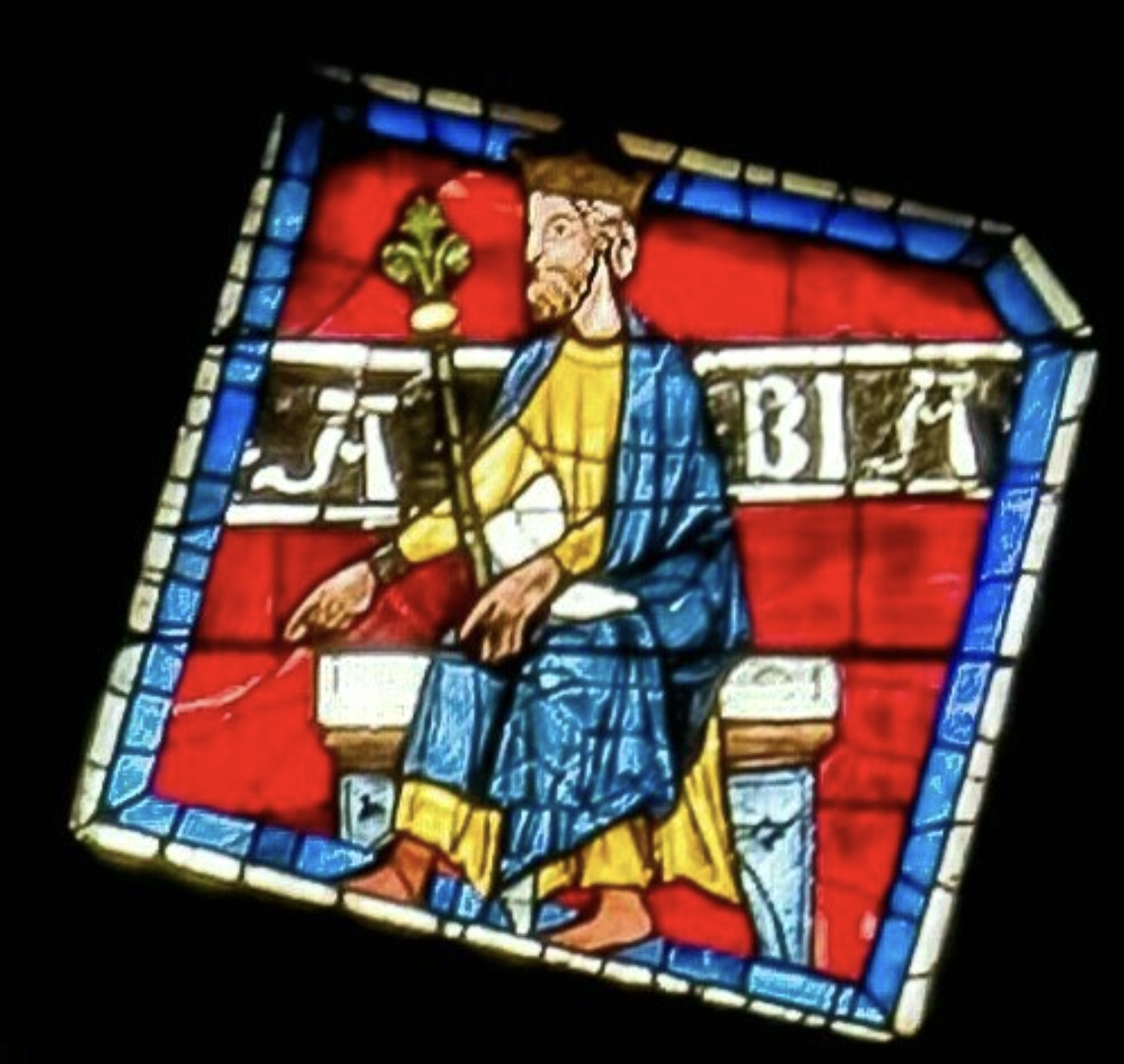
King Abijah, from the north rose window of Chartres Cathedral

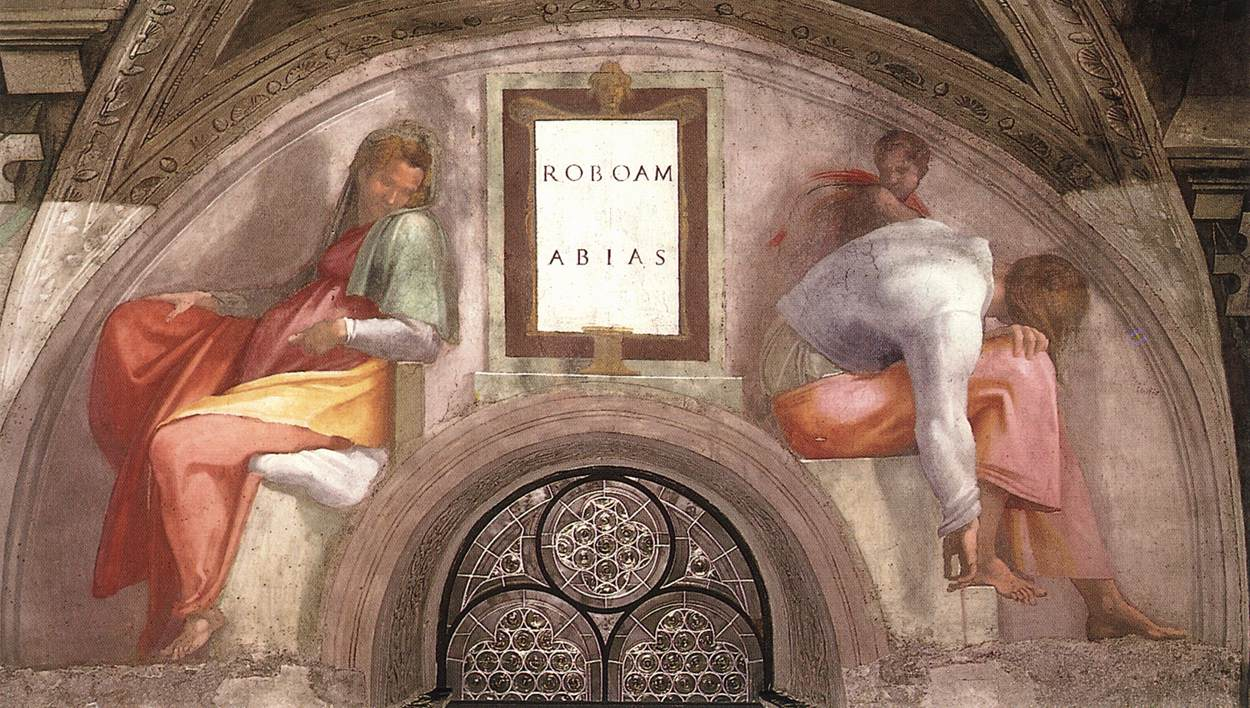
Rehoboam and Abijah, from the Sistine Chapel ceiling

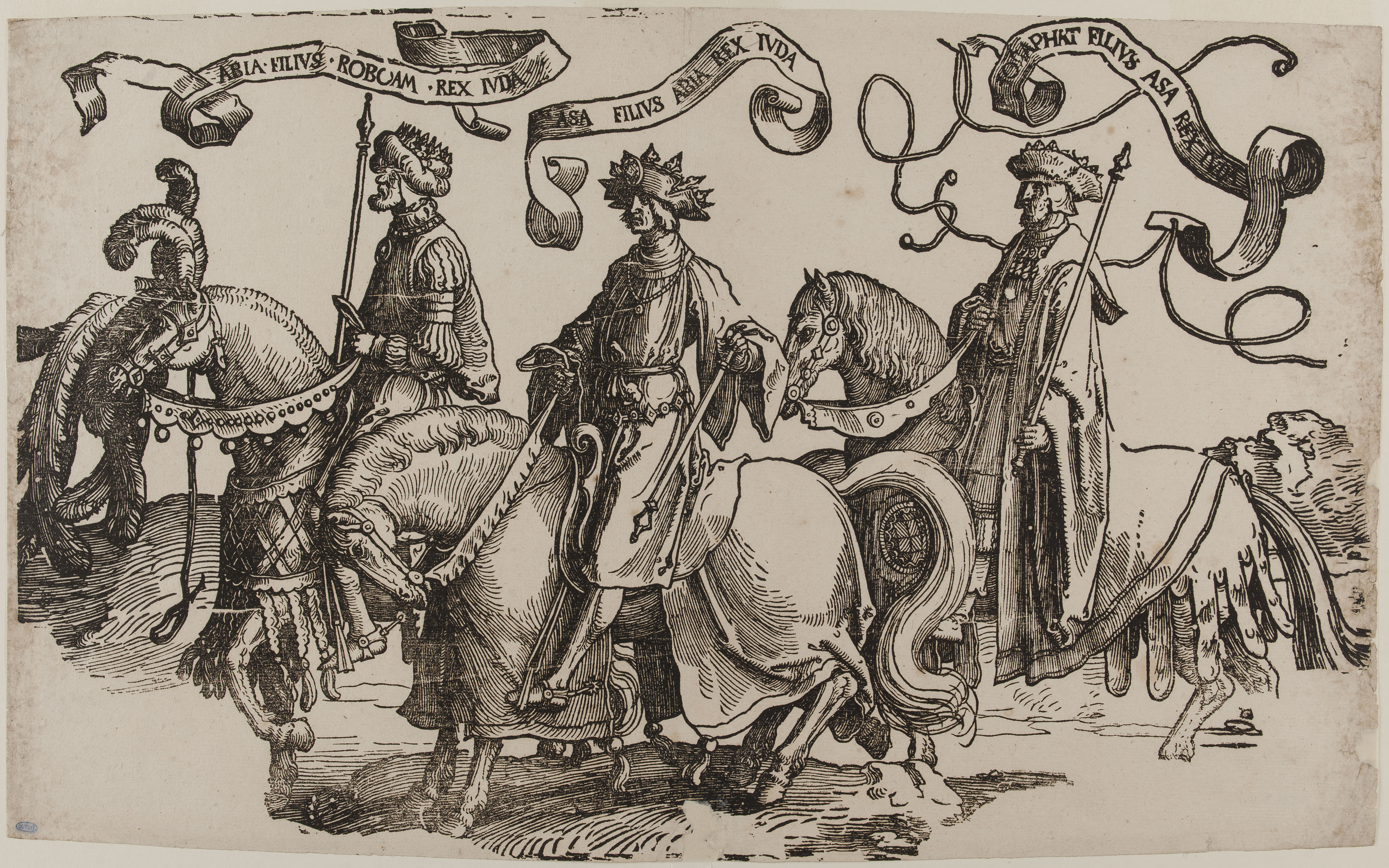
Abijah, Asa, and Jehoshaphat, by Lucas van Leyden

Abijam (Hebrew: אֲבִיָּם, romanized: ʼĂḇīyyām, lit. 'my father is Yam'; Biblical Greek: Αβιού, romanized: Aviou; Latin: Abiam) was, according to the Hebrew Bible, the fourth king of the House of David and the second of the Kingdom of Judah. He was the son of Rehoboam and the grandson of Solomon. The Books of Chronicles refer to him as Abijah. (Note: Hebrew: אֲבִיָּה, romanized: ʼĂḇīyyā, lit. '"my father is Yah"'; Greek: Αβια; Latin: Abia)

== In the Hebrew Bible/Tanakh and Old Testament ==
=== Family ===
Abijam is reported in the books of Kings and Chronicles as being the son of Maacah or Micaiah and father of King Asa of Judah. Some scholars believe the biblical accounts of Abijam's family to be contradictory. One of the contradictions is that Maacah is sometimes described as the daughter of Absalom, and elsewhere the daughter of Uriel. Absalom is described as only having one daughter, Tamar. Apologists have countered by arguing that in Hebrew, "daughter" and "granddaughter" are the same word. Similarly, Maacah is initially described as Abijah's mother, but subsequently described as the mother of his son Asa. Apologists argue similarly for the ambiguity of the term "mother". Abijah married fourteen wives, and had 22 sons and 16 daughters. No attempted harmonization has found acceptance with scholars.

=== Reign ===
Following the death of Rehoboam, his son Abijah succeeded the throne as King of Judah. He began his three-year reign (2 Chr. 12:16; 13:1, 2) with a strenuous but unsuccessful effort to bring back the ten tribes of the northern Kingdom of Israel to their allegiance, a path which in 2 Chronicles 11:4 his father had chosen not to follow.

Following Abijah's ascension to the throne in the 18th year of King Jeroboam I of Israel, he marched north to win Israel back to the Davidic kingdom. Jeroboam surrounded Abijah's army, engaging in the Battle of Mount Zemaraim. Abijah rallied his troops there and went on to capture the Israelite cities of Jeshanah, Ephron (now Taybeh, Ramallah), and Bethel.

== Commentaries ==
Non-conformist minister Alexander Maclaren considers Abijah "a wiser and better man than his father".

According to the Deuteronomist, "Yet, for the sake of David, YHWH his God gave him a lamp in Jerusalem, by raising up his descendant after him and by preserving Jerusalem." (1 Kings 15:4). The wording in the Septuagint is "the Lord gave him a remnant". Thus the unconditional covenant blessing of God guaranteed his promise to King David to stabilize the kingdom despite its ruler. The Chronicler also emphasizes YHWH's promise as seen by Abijah's success against every effort by Jeroboam to defeat him according to 2 Chronicles 13:18.

God had given the Kingdom to David and his descendants according to 1 Chronicles 17:14 by a covenant of salt, meaning "of permanence" (cf. Leviticus 2:13).

== Rabbinic literature ==
Although Abijah took up God's cause against Jeroboam, the idolatrous king of Israel, he was not permitted to enjoy the fruits of his victory over the latter for any considerable time, dying as he did shortly after his campaign (Josephus, Ant. viii. 11, § 3). The rabbis recount many transgressions committed by Abijah against his fellow men, drawing God's vengeance upon him more speedily than upon Jeroboam's idolatries. It is stated that he mutilated the corpses of Jeroboam's soldiers and would not permit them to be interred until they had arrived at a state of putrefaction. Nor did Abijah show himself zealous in God's cause, for when, by the conquest of Bethel (II Chronicles xiii. 19), the golden calves came into his possession, he did not destroy them as the law (Deuteronomy vii. 25) enjoined. The rabbis also point out that it was improper for Abijah to accuse the whole of Israel of idolatry and to proclaim the appointment of Jeroboam as king to have been the work of "vain men, the children of Belial" (II Chronicles xiii. 7) since it was the prophet Ahijah the Shilonite who prophesied that Jeroboam would be king (I Kings, xi. 37). For these reasons Abijah's reign was a short one.

== In Christianity ==
In Matthew's gospel, Abijah appears in the genealogy of Jesus.

== Chronological discrepancies ==
According to 2 Chronicles 13:1–2, Abijah became king of Judah in the 18th year of the reign of Jeroboam, and reigned for three years.

William F. Albright has dated his reign to 915–913 BCE.

E. R. Thiele offers the dates 914/913 – 911/910 BCE. As explained in the Rehoboam article, Thiele's chronology for the first kings of Judah contained an internal inconsistency which later scholars corrected by dating these kings one year earlier, so that Abijah's dates are taken as 915/914 to 912/911 BCE in the present article.

== Works cited ==
- Easton, Matthew George (1894). Illustrated Bible Dictionary (2nd ed.). London, England: T. Nelson.
- Eerdmans (2000). Eerdmans Dictionary of the Bible (David Noel Freedman, Allen C. Myers, Astrid B. Beck ed.). Wm. B. Eerdmans Publishing. ISBN 9780802824004.
- Merrill, Eugene H. (2008). Kingdom of Priests: A History of Old Testament Israel. Grand Rapids, Michigan: Baker Academic. p. 347. ISBN 9781441217073.
- Provan, I.W.; Hubbard, R.L.; Johnston, R.K. (2012). 1 & 2 Kings. Understanding the Bible Commentary Series. Baker Publishing Group. ISBN 978-1-4412-3830-6.
- Pulkrabek, W.W. (2007). Family Trees of the Bible: Family Tree Charts and Genealogical Information of the Main Characters in the Christian Bible. Vantage Press. ISBN 978-0-533-15607-8.
- Sweeney, M.A. (2007). I & II Kings: A Commentary. Old Testament library. Westminster John Knox Press. ISBN 978-0-664-22084-6.
- Thiele, Edwin R. (1983). The Mysterious Numbers of the Hebrew Kings (3rd ed.). Grand Rapids, Michigan: Zondervan. ISBN 978-0-310-36010-0.
- Tyndale (2001). Tyndale Bible Dictionary (Walter A. Elwell, Philip Wesley Comfort ed.). Wheaton, Illinois: Tyndale House Publishers. p. 5. ISBN 9780842370899.
- Wycliffe (1962). The Wycliffe Bible Commentary (Charles F. Pfeiffer, Everett F. Harrison ed.). Moody Publishers. ISBN 9781575677163.
- Zucker, D.J. (2013). The Bible's Writings: An Introduction for Christians and Jews. Wipf & Stock Publishers. ISBN 978-1-63087-112-3.

Abijah of Judah House of David Cadet branch of the Tribe of Judah; Contemporary King of Israel: Jeroboam I
Regnal titles
Preceded by Rehoboam	King of Judah; 913–912 BCE	Succeeded by Asa
