= 2 Chronicles 14 =

Second Book of Chronicles, chapter 14

- ← chapter 13 chapter 15 →
- The complete Hebrew text of the Books of Chronicles (1st and 2nd Chronicles) in the Leningrad Codex (1008 CE).
- Book: Books of Chronicles
- Category: Ketuvim
- Christian Bible part: Old Testament
- Order in the Christian part: 14

2 Chronicles 14 is the fourteenth chapter of the Second Book of Chronicles the Old Testament in the Christian Bible or of the second part of the Books of Chronicles in the Hebrew Bible. The book is compiled from older sources by an unknown person or group, designated by modern scholars as "the Chronicler", and had the final shape established in late fifth or fourth century BCE. This chapter belongs to the section focusing on the kingdom of Judah until its destruction by the Babylonians under Nebuchadnezzar and the beginning of restoration under Cyrus the Great of Persia (2 Chronicles 10 to 36). The focus of this chapter is the reign of Asa, king of Judah.

== Text ==
This chapter was originally written in the Hebrew language and is divided into 15 verses in Christian Bibles, but 14 verses in the Hebrew Bible with the following verse numbering comparison:

Verse numbering for 2 Chronicles 13 and 14
English	Hebrew
14:1	13:23
14:2-15	14:1-14

This article generally follows the common numbering in Christian English Bible versions, with notes to the numbering in Hebrew Bible versions.

=== Textual witnesses ===
Some early manuscripts containing the text of this chapter in Hebrew are of the Masoretic Text tradition, which includes the Aleppo Codex (10th century), and Codex Leningradensis (1008).

There is also a translation into Koine Greek known as the Septuagint, made in the last few centuries BCE. Extant ancient manuscripts of the Septuagint version include Codex Vaticanus (B; $\mathfrak{G}$^{B}; 4th century), and Codex Alexandrinus (A; $\mathfrak{G}$^{A}; 5th century). (Note: The whole book of 2 Chronicles is missing from the extant Codex Sinaiticus.)

=== Old Testament references ===
- 2 Chronicles 14:1–15: 1 Kings 15:9–15

== Asa king of Judah (14:1–2) ==
The record of Asa's reign in the Chronicles (2 Chronicles 14–16) is almost three times longer than in 1 Kings (15:9–24), consisting of two distinct phases:

- 34 years of fidelity
- 7 years of infidelity (16:1–12).

Although not free from fault (2 Chronicles 16:7, 10, 12), the evaluation of Asa is positive (verse 2), because overall "he did that which was good and right" (cf. 1 Kings 15:14).

=== Verse 1 ===
And Abijah slept with his fathers, and they buried him in the City of David. Asa his son then reigned in his place. In his days the land was quiet for ten years.

- Parallel: 1 Kings 15:8
- "City of David" refers to the "fortress of Zion" in Jerusalem, not to Bethlehem (cf. 2 Samuel 5:7).

== Asa’s religious accomplishments (14:3–8) ==
This section deals with three themes:

- (1) Asa's cultic reforms (verses 3–5);
- (2) Asa's building projects verses 6–7);
- (3) Asa's reinforcement of the army (verse 8).

The Chronicles omits the abolition of the hierodules ("male prostitutes") and all edifices recorded in 1 Kings 15:12.

== War between Asa and Zerah the Ethiopian (14:9–15) ==
This section records a sacral war (cf. 2 Chronicles 13:2–20), where the outnumbered army of Judah faced a strong enemy, but when they cried to God (in accordance to 2 Chronicles 6:34–35), they achieved a victory and took abundant booty (verses 12–15). The phrase "cities around Gerar" (verse 14) and the words "tents ... sheep... goats ...camels" indicate that the defeated enemy was an "Arab-Edomite tribe".

=== Verse 9 ===
Then Zerah the Ethiopian came out against them with an army of a million men and three hundred chariots, and he came to Mareshah.

- "Ethiopian": from Hebrew: ha-Kûshî, "Cushite" (cf. 1 Chronicles 1:8 for "Cush").
- "Zerah the Ethiopian": has been identified with Osorchon II (hieroglyphic: Uasarken), who succeeded "Shishak" (who plundered Jerusalem at the time of Rehoboam; cf. 2 ) as the king of Egypt. His army probably consisted of Edomite-Arab Nomads, because Zerah was also an Edomite name in the Hebrew Bible, whereas "Cush" is connected with "Midian" in Habakkuk 3:7, not exclusively referring to Egypt/Ethiopia.
- "Mareshah" located 40 kilometres (25 mi) southwest of Jerusalem, was one of the southern cities fortified by Rehoboam, becoming a center for Edomite (Idumean) slave trade according to the Zenon papyri (261–252 BCE) (cf 1 Chronicles 4:39–43; 5:10).

== See also ==
- Edom
- Ethiopia
- Jerusalem
- Solomon
- Related Bible parts: 1 Kings 15, 1 Chronicles 6, 1 Chronicles 18, 1 Chronicles 22, 1 Chronicles 29, 2 Chronicles 6, Habakkuk 3

== Sources ==
- Ackroyd, Peter R (1993). "Chronicles, Books of". In Metzger, Bruce M; Coogan, Michael D (eds.). The Oxford Companion to the Bible. Oxford University Press. pp. 113–116. ISBN 978-0195046458.
- Bennett, William (2018). The Expositor's Bible: The Books of Chronicles. Litres. ISBN 978-5040825196.
- Coogan, Michael David (2007). Coogan, Michael David; Brettler, Marc Zvi; Newsom, Carol Ann; Perkins, Pheme (eds.). The New Oxford Annotated Bible with the Apocryphal/Deuterocanonical Books: New Revised Standard Version, Issue 48 (Augmented 3rd ed.). Oxford University Press. ISBN 9780195288810.
- Mabie, Frederick (2017). "I. The Chronicler's Genealogical Survey of All Israel". In Longman III, Tremper; Garland, David E (eds.). 1 and 2 Chronicles. The Expositor's Bible Commentary. Zondervan. pp. 267–308. ISBN 978-0310531814.
- Mathys, H. P. (2007). "14. 1 and 2 Chronicles". In Barton, John; Muddiman, John (eds.). The Oxford Bible Commentary (first (paperback) ed.). Oxford University Press. pp. 267–308. ISBN 978-0199277186.
- Würthwein, Ernst (1995). The Text of the Old Testament. Translated by Rhodes, Erroll F. Grand Rapids, MI: William B. Eerdmans. ISBN 0-8028-0788-7.
