= Valerius Coucke =

- Born: 2 February 1888; Poperinge, West Flanders, Belgium
- Died: 20 December 1951 (aged 63); Bruges, West Flanders, Belgium
- Known for: Derived date of start of construction of Solomon’s Temple using various classical (non-biblical) authors (Parian Marble, Tyrian King List, Pompeius Trogus) that agrees exactly with date later derived from biblical and Assyrian data.
- Scientific career
- Fields: history, chronology
- Workplaces: Major Seminary, Bruges

Valerius Josephus Coucke (2 February 1888 – 20 December 1951 (aged 63) ) was a Belgian scholar and priest who was professor at the Major Seminary, Bruges in the 1920s. His importance to modern scholarship comes from his writings in the field of Old Testament chronology. His study of the methods of the authors of the books of Kings and Chronicles led him to conclusions that were later discovered, independently, by Edwin R. Thiele. His approach was distinctive for the use of citations in classical authors to obtain fixed dates in biblical history, most notably the date for the beginning of construction of Solomon's Temple.

== Biography ==
Coucke was born on 2 February 1888, in Poperinge, in the Belgian province of West Flanders. He studied at the Catholic University of Leuven, where he graduated Bachelor of Sacred Theology (S.T.B.). He was ordained a Catholic priest in 1912 and was appointed to several parishes: Bredene, Staden, and Hooglede (all in the diocese of Bruges in Belgium). In 1919, he became a professor at the Major Seminary in Bruges, where he taught sacramental theology and moral theology. In 1927 he became the seminary's librarian and also its bursar. In 1928, he was appointed a canon of St. Salvator's Cathedral in Bruges. He died in Bruges on 20 December 1951.

== Academic contributions ==
=== Comparison of his chronology to that of Thiele ===
Coucke broke from the approach of the Documentary Hypothesis that was popular among European scholars in his day by starting with the working proposition that the chronological data of Kings and Chronicles represented authentic traditions that could be understood once the methods of the ancient scribes were determined. This was in contrast to the skepticism to such an approach inherent in the postulates of the "higher criticism" then prevalent, which assumed that the chronological and other historical data of the Bible's historical books were the product of late-date editors, and hence were of little or no historical value. Coucke departed from this presupposition, using instead the data of the biblical texts as his starting place (an inductive approach). From these data, he came to the following conclusions: 1) During the period of the divided kingdom, Judah's regnal year began in the fall month of Tishri, whereas that of the northern kingdom, Israel, began in Nisan. (Coucke also allowed that the northern kingdom may have begun its calendar in the Egyptian month of Thoth, since Jeroboam resided in Egypt for many years before becoming the first king of Israel, but Coucke was wrong in assuming that at the time of Egypt's Third Intermediate Period, Thoth came in the spring at the same time as the Hebrew Nisan.) 2) For the first few years of the divided kingdom, Judah used accession reckoning for its kings, whereas Israel used nonaccession reckoning. 3) During the rapprochement between the two kingdoms in the ninth century BC, Judah adopted Israel's nonaccession reckoning. 4) Later, both kingdoms used accession reckoning until the end of their respective kingdoms, and 5) In order to make sense of the biblical data, coregencies, both those expressed explicitly in the text and those implied by the data, must be taken into account. This last principle has been much criticized when espoused by Thiele, but it is widely used by Egyptologists in their computations of Egyptian chronology.

These five principles are identical to those later discovered by Edwin R. Thiele, who was unaware of Coucke's work when he published the results of his doctoral dissertation in 1944. It was apparently Thiele's colleague, Siegfried Horn, who introduced Thiele to the writings of Coucke when Horn came to America in 1946. In his subsequent writings, Thiele acknowledged the earlier work of Coucke, and he was gratified that the discovery of these basic principles by two scholars working independently served to authenticate the soundness of their respective approaches. The two authors, however, differed somewhat on how to apply the principles they had discovered, so that their chronologies disagree in several places. They are in exact agreement at the beginning of the divided monarchy, which both Coucke and Thiele placed in the year starting in Nisan of 931 BC. Coucke's method of deriving this date differed radically from Thiele's method, as explained in the next two sections. For the end of the kingdom period, Coucke placed the fall of Jerusalem to the Babylonians in the summer of 587 BC, whereas Thiele put it a year later, in 586.

=== His use of the Parian Marble to date construction of Solomon’s Temple ===
Coucke had some difficulty in determining dates for Ahab, king of Israel, and so he did not place the Battle of Qarqar, at which Ahab was present, as the last year of Ahab, as Thiele did in assigning absolute (BC) dates to the first kings of Israel. His date for the battle, 854 BC, was also one year too early, although that was the date used by most Assyriologists when he wrote. He knew that it would be unwise to assign absolute dates to the kings in this time frame based on his proposed emendations of their reign lengths, and so he sought a more reliable method of finding a fixed date for the early monarchic period. He developed such a method in just three sentences of his Supplément article, using classical authors with no utilization of any biblical text. His starting place was the end of the Trojan War, which the Parian Marble dated to the year 1208 BC, seven days before the end of the month of Thargelion, that is, 10 June 1208 BC (Coucke mistakenly thought that the Marble gave the year as 1207 BC, but the correct year of 1208 BC, as given at the Ashmolean Web site, will be used in what follows). He then cited a statement of Pompeius Trogus/Justin (18:3:5) that said that Tyre was founded (or refounded) one year before the fall of Troy, that is, in 1209 BC. From Josephus, who apparently was using the archives of Tyre as his source, he determined that it was either 240 years (Antiquities 8:3:1/62) or 241 years (Against Apion 1:18/126) from Tyre's founding to the 11th or 12th year of Hiram, King of Tyre, at which time Hiram sent assistance to Solomon at the beginning of construction of the Temple in Jerusalem. Coucke therefore determined that Temple construction began in either (1209 BC – 240 =) 969 BC or (1209 BC – 241 =) 968 BC, depending on whether it was in the eleventh year of Hiram (so Antiquities) or his twelfth year (so Against Apion).

=== His use of the Tyrian King List to refine this date ===
Coucke had another avenue of approach to the date of construction of Solomon's Temple. Like the first approach that started from the Parian Marble's date for the fall of Troy, his second method was also derived from classical writings, with no utilization of biblical texts. It made use of the list of Tyrian kings recorded in Josephus's Against Apion 1:17/108 and 1:18/117–126. In providing the list of kings, Josephus said he was taking his information from Menander of Ephesus, who translated the records of the Tyrian archives from Phoenician into Greek. Although the individual reign lengths of the various kings in the list show considerable variation due to copying errors over the centuries since Josephus wrote, the total number of years given from the time that Hiram sent assistance to Solomon at the beginning of Temple construction to the flight of Dido/Elissa from Tyre, after which she and her associates founded Carthage, has been preserved intact due to its three-fold repetition. This figure is given twice as 143 years and eight months, and once as 155 years from the accession of Hiram, minus the 12 years until he began to help Solomon. This redundancy of expression has preserved the total of years in virtually all extant copies of the Tyrian King List, so that Coucke and other scholars have felt confident in using it in their calculations.

Coucke derived either 825 or 824 BC as the possible dates for the founding of Carthage, based on Pompeius Trogus's statement that it was founded 72 years before the founding of Rome, for which Coucke accepted either 753 BC (Varro) or 752 BC (Dionysius of Halicarnassus). Using the statement of Josephus/Menander that placed the founding of Solomon's Temple 143 years earlier than the founding of Carthage, Coucke derived 968 or 967 BC as the dates for the founding of Solomon's Temple. Since only the first of these agreed with the two dates he had derived when starting from the Parian Marble (969 and 968), he decided on 968/67 BC as the time of foundation of the Temple. He assumed Tyre used Tishri-based years, since the use of Phoenician month-names (Ziv, Bul, Ethanim) in the time of Solomon suggested that Israel and Tyre were using the same calendar at this time in their histories. With this assumption, he then turned to the biblical datum that construction began in the spring month of Ziv, deriving the date for the beginning of construction as the spring of 967 BC, with Solomon's fourth year (1 Kings 6:1) starting in Tishri of 968 BC.

== Writings ==
Only two publications by Coucke are known. The earlier is the article "Chronologie des rois de Juda et d'Israël", Revue Bénédictine 37 (1925), pp. 325–364. The ideas and chronology of this article were expanded and included in his contribution to the article "Chronologie biblique" in Supplément au dictionnaire de la Bible, ed. Louis Pirot, vol. 1 (Paris: Librairie Letouzey et Ané, 1928), cols. 1245–1279. In late 2010, a search by the principal librarian of the Grootseminarie library, where Coucke had been principal librarian several decades previously, failed to find any further publications for which he was the author.
