= The Mysterious Numbers of the Hebrew Kings =

1951 book by Edwin R. Thiele

- Cover of the third edition, published in 1983
- Author: Edwin R. Thiele
- Publisher: University of Chicago Press
- Publication date: 1951
- OCLC: 908868390

The Mysterious Numbers of the Hebrew Kings (1951) is a reconstruction of the chronology of the kingdoms of Israel and Judah by Edwin R. Thiele. The book was originally his doctoral dissertation and is widely regarded as the definitive work on the chronology of Hebrew Kings. The book is considered the classic and comprehensive work in reckoning the accession of kings, calendars, and co-regencies, based on biblical and extra-biblical sources.

== Biblical chronology ==
The chronology of the kings of Israel and Judah rests primarily on a series of reign lengths and cross references within the books of Kings and Chronicles, in which the accession of each king is dated in terms of the reign of his contemporary in either the southern Kingdom of Judah or the northern Kingdom of Israel, and fitting them into the chronology of other ancient civilizations.

However, some of the biblical cross references did not seem to match, so that a reign which is said to have lasted for 20 years results in a cross reference that would give a result of either 19 or 21 years. Thiele noticed that the cross references given during the long reign of King Asa of Judah had a cumulative error of 1 year for each succeeding reign of the kings of Israel: the first cross-reference resulted in an error of 1 year, the second gave an error of 2 years, the third of 3 years and so on. He explained this pattern as a result of two different methods of reckoning regnal years: the accession year method in one and the non-accession year method in the other. Under the accession year method, if a king died in the middle of a year, the period to the end of that year would be called the "accession year" of the new king, whose Year 1 would begin at the new year. Under the non-accession year method the period to the end of the year would be Year 1 of the new king and Year 2 would begin at the start of the new year. Israel appears to have used the non-accession method, while Judah used the accession method until Athaliah seized power in Judah, when Israel's non-accession method appears to have been adopted in Judah.

In addition, Thiele also concluded that Israel counted years starting in the spring month of Nisan, while Judah counted years starting in the autumn month of Tishri. The cumulative impact of differing new years and different methods of calculating reigns explained, to Thiele, most of the apparent inconsistencies in the cross references.

Unknown to Thiele when he first published his findings, these same conclusions that the northern kingdom used non-accession years and a spring New Year while the southern kingdom used accession years and a fall New Year had been discovered by Valerius Coucke of Belgium some years previously, a fact which Thiele acknowledges in his Mysterious Numbers.

== Conclusions ==
Based on his conclusions, Thiele showed that the 14 years between Ahab and Jehu were really 12 years. This enabled him to date their reigns precisely, for Ahab is mentioned in the Kurk Stele which records the Assyrian advance into Syria/Israel at the Battle of Qarqar in 853 BC, and Jehu is mentioned on the Black Obelisk of Shalmaneser III paying tribute in 841 BC. As these two events are dated by Assyrian chronology as being 12 years apart, Ahab must have fought the Assyrians in his last year and Jehu paid tribute in his first year.

Thiele was able to reconcile the Biblical chronological data from the books of Kings and Chronicles with the exception of synchronisms between Hoshea of Israel and Hezekiah of Judah towards the end of the kingdom of Israel and reluctantly concluded that at that point the ancient authors had made a mistake. Oddly, it is at that precise point that he himself makes a mistake, by failing to realize that Hezekiah had a coregency with his father Ahaz, which explains the Hoshea/Hezekiah synchronisms. This correction has been supplied by subsequent writers who built on Thiele's work, including Thiele's colleague Siegfried Horn, T. C. Mitchell and Kenneth Kitchen, and Leslie McFall.

Thiele's method in arriving at his chronology has been contrasted with the analytical method employed by Julius Wellhausen and other scholars who follow some form of the documentary hypothesis. Wellhausen taught that the chronological data of the books of Kings and Chronicles were artificially put together at a date much later than the events they were ostensibly describing and were basically not historical. This was a necessary consequence of his a priori assumption that the biblical books as we have them today were the work of late-date editors who could not possibly have known the correct history of the times they were writing about. Theodore Robinson summarized this position as follows: "Wellhausen is surely right in believing that the synchronisms in Kings are worthless, being merely a late compilation from the actual figures given."

Wellhausen's methodology in interpreting the Scriptures and the history of Israel has therefore been classed by RK Harrison as a deductive approach; that is, one that starts with presuppositions and derives a historical reconstruction from those presuppositions. A necessary consequence of this approach has been that no general agreement has been reached on the chronology of the Hebrew kingdom period as calculated by authors who adopted this method. "The disadvantage of the deductive approach is that nothing is settled for certain; the results obtained are as diverse as the presuppositions of the scholars, since diverse presuppositions produce diverse results." In contrast, Thiele's method of determining the chronology of the Hebrew kings was based on induction, that is, making it a matter of first priority to determine the actual methods used by ancient scribes and court recorders in recording the years of kings, as described above. Thiele's inductive method, then, was based on inscriptional evidence from the ancient Near East, and not on the presuppositions followed by liberal scholarship. It is Thiele's method that has produced the determinative studies for the chronology of the kingdom period, not the presupposition-based method, so that even those interpreters who continue in late-date theories for the authorship of Scripture have recognized the credibility of Thiele's scholarship in determining the date for the division of the kingdom after the death of Solomon, as cited above. The work of Thiele and other textual scholars who have followed an inductive (evidence-based) approach is therefore significant in providing an alternative to the methods of the documentary hypothesis, and the success of that approach has been seen as theologically significant in supporting a high view of the inspiration of Scripture, particularly regarding its integrity in the abundant and complex historical data related to the kingdom period.

If the chronological data of the MT [ Masoretic Text ] were not authentic—the actual dates and synchronisms for these various kings—then neither Thiele nor McFall nor anyone else could have constructed a chronology from them that in every case is faithful to the original texts and in every proven instance is consistent with Assyrian and Babylonian chronology. This mathematical demonstration should sit in judgment over the various theories of text formation: If a theory of text formation cannot explain how the chronological data of the MT has produced a chronology that in every respect seems authentic for the four centuries of the monarchic period, then that theory must be rejected as another example of a presupposition-based approach that cannot meet the rational criteria for credibility.

== Chronology of the Hebrew kings according to Thiele's work ==
ISRAEL				JUDAH								
King	Reign		Length	King	Accession age as		Reign as		Length	Age at		
King	overlapping	sole	Length	King	co- regent	sole king	Co- regent	sole king	Length	son's birth	son's coregency	death
Jeroboam I		931/0-910/9	22	Rehoboam son of Solomon		41		931/0- 913	17			59
Jeroboam I		931/0-910/9	22	Abijah son of Rehoboam				913- 911/0	3			
Nadab		910/9-909/8	2	Asa son of Abijah				911/0- 870/9	41			
Baasha		909/8-886/5	24	Asa son of Abijah				911/0- 870/9	41			
Elah		886/5-885/4	2	Asa son of Abijah				911/0- 870/9	41			
Zimri		885/4	0,02	Asa son of Abijah				911/0- 870/9	41			
Tibni		885/4-880		Asa son of Abijah				911/0- 870/9	41			
Omri	885/4-880	880-874/3	12	Asa son of Abijah				911/0- 870/9	41			
Ahab		874/3-853	22	Jehoshaphat son of Asa	35	38	872/1- 870/9	870/9- 848	25	23	54	59
Ahaziah		853-852	2	Jehoram son of Jehoshaphat	32	37	853- 848	848- 841	8	23		44
Joram		852-841	12	Ahaziah son of Jehoram		22 (42)		841	1	22		22
Jehu		841-814/3	28	Athaliah daughter of Ahab				841- 835				
Jehoahaz		814/3-798	17	Joash son of Ahaziah		7		835- 796	40	22		46
Jehoash		798-782/1	16	Amaziah son of Joash		25		796- 767	29	15	30	54
Jeroboam II	793/2-782/1	782/1-753	41	Azariah (Uzziah) son of Amaziah	16	39	792/1- 767	767- 740/9	52	33	57	68
Zechariah		753-752	0,5	Azariah (Uzziah) son of Amaziah	16	39	792/1- 767	767- 740/9	52	33	57	68
Shallum		752	0,08	Azariah (Uzziah) son of Amaziah	16	39	792/1- 767	767- 740/9	52	33	57	68
Menahem		752-742/1	10	Jotham son of Azariah	25	36	750- 740/9	740/9- 732/1	16	21		44
Pekahiah		742/1-740/9	2	Jotham son of Azariah	25	36	750- 740/9	740/9- 732/1	16	21		44
Pekah	752-740/9	740/9-732/1	20	Ahaz son of Jotham		20	735- 732/1	732/1- 716/5	16	16		40
Hoshea		732/1-723/2	9	Ahaz son of Jotham		20	735- 732/1	732/1- 716/5	16	16		40
				Hezekiah son of Ahaz		25		716/5- 687/6	29	33	44	54
				Manasseh son of Hezekiah	12	22	697/6- 687/6	687/6- 643/2	55	45		66
				Amon son of Manasseh		22		643/2- 641/0	2	17		24
				Josiah son of Amon		8		641/0- 609	31	17 Jehoahaz; 16 Jehoiakim; 31 Zedekiah		39
				Jehoahaz son of Josiah		23		609	0,25			
				Jehoiakim son of Josiah		25		609- 598	11	19		36
				Jehoiachin son of Jehoiakim		18 (8)		598- 597	0,25			
				Zedekiah son of Josiah		21		597- 586	11			

== Reception ==
Thiele's chronological reconstruction has not been accepted by all scholars, nor has any other scholar's work in this field. Yet the work of Thiele and those who followed in his steps has achieved acceptance across a wider spectrum than that of any comparable chronology, so that Assyriologist DJ Wiseman wrote “The chronology most widely accepted today is one based on the meticulous study by Thiele,” and, more recently, Leslie McFall: “Thiele’s chronology is fast becoming the consensus view among Old Testament scholars, if it has not already reached that point.” Although criticism has been leveled at numerous specific points in his chronology, his work has won considerable praise even from those who disagree with his final conclusions. Nevertheless, even scholars sharing Thiele's religious convictions have maintained that there are weaknesses in his argument such as unfounded assumptions and assumed circular reasoning.

In his desire to resolve the discrepancies between the data in the Book of Kings, Thiele was forced to make improbable suppositions… There is no basis for Thiele's statement that his conjectures are correct because he succeeded in reconciling most of the data in the Book of Kings, since his assumptions… are derived from the chronological data themselves…"

This citation, from a critic of Thiele's system, demonstrates the difference mentioned above between the deductive approach based on presuppositions and an inductive approach based on data, not a priori assumptions. Thiele is criticized here for basing his theories on data or evidence, not on presuppositions.

Despite these criticisms Thiele's methodological treatment remains the typical starting point of scholarly treatments of the subject, and his work is considered to have established the date of the division of the Israelite kingdom. This has found independent support in the work of J. Liver, Frank M. Cross, and others studying the chronology of the kings of Tyre. Thiele's work has found widespread recognition and use across various related scholarly disciplines. His date of 931 BCE, in conjunction with the synchronism between Rehoboam and Pharaoh Shishak in 1 Kings 14:25, is used by Egyptologists to give absolute dates to Egypt's 22nd Dynasty, and his work has also been used by scholars in other disciplines to establish Assyrian and Babylonian dates. Criticism of Thiele's reconstruction led to further research which has refined or even departed from his synthesis. Notable studies of this type include work by Tadmor and McFall.

Scholarly attitudes towards the Biblical record of the Israelite monarchies from the late nineteenth century to the mid-twentieth century were largely disparaging, treating the records as essentially fictional and dismissing the value of the regnal synchronisms. In contrast, modern scholarly attitudes to the monarchical chronology and synchronisms in 1 and 2 Kings has been far more positive subsequent to the work of Thiele and those who have developed his thesis further, a change in attitude to which recent archaeology has contributed.

== Publication ==
The University of Chicago Press published the first edition of the work in 1951. Thiele published a revised edition with Eerdmans, a religious publishing house based in Grand Rapids, Michigan, in 1965. Among other changes, Thiele removed three chapters that "dealt with the variant chronological data of the Greek texts and Josephus, as well as a review of modern chronological systems." Zondervan, a Christian media publishing company also based in Grand Rapids, published a third, revised edition in 1983, three years before Thiele's death.
