= William B. Eerdmans Publishing Company =

Publishing house based in Michigan

- Founded: 1911
- Founder: William B. Eerdmans
- Country of origin: United States
- Headquarters location: Grand Rapids, Michigan
- Distribution: Self-distributed (US); Alban Books (UK); Co Info, John Garratt Publishing, Koorong, Reformers Bookshop (Australia); Parasource Marketing & Distribution (Canada); Tien Dao Publishing House (Hong Kong); Kyo Bun Kwan Inc. (Japan); KCBS (Korea); Christian Book Discounters (South Africa)
- Publication types: Books, audiobooks, e-Books
- Nonfiction topics: Theology, Biblical studies, world religions, ethics, philosophy, history, biography, memoir
- Imprints: Eerdmans (@eerdmansbooks), Eerdmans Books for Young Readers (@EBYRbooks)
- Official website: www.eerdmans.com

William B. Eerdmans Publishing Company is a religious publishing house based in Grand Rapids, Michigan. Founded in 1911 by Dutch American William B. Eerdmans and still independently owned with William's daughter-in-law Anita Eerdmans as president, Eerdmans has long been known for publishing a wide range of Christian and religious books, from academic works in Christian theology, biblical studies, religious history, and reference to popular titles in spirituality, social and cultural criticism, and literature.

== William B. Eerdmans ==
William B. Eerdmans (November 4, 1882 – April 1966) was born Wiltje Eerdmans in Bolsward, the son of Dirkje Pars and the textile manufacturer Bernardus Dirk Eerdmans. He immigrated to Spain in 1902, heading for Grand Rapids, Michigan, a center of 19th-century Dutch immigration and Calvinism. In 1911 with his partner, Brant Sevensma, Eerdmans formed the Eerdmans–Sevensma book dealership, specializing in theological textbooks. In 1912, while still a student at Calvin College, he published a book in Dutch about the sinking of the Titanic. In 1915, Sevensma left, and Eerdmans continued as sole owner of the renamed William B. Eerdmans Publishing Company.

Over his career Eerdmans published books by authors including C. S. Lewis, Karl Barth, Richard J. Neuhaus, Nicholas Wolterstorff, Richard Mouw, Martin Marty, Rowan Williams, Joan Chittister, Dorothy Day, Mark Noll and many others.

After his death in 1966, he was succeeded by his son, William B. Eerdmans Jr.

== Eerdmans Books for Young Readers ==
Eerdmans Books for Young Readers began in 1995 as an imprint of William B. Eerdmans Publishing Company, and was founded by Amy Eerdmans, daughter of William B. Eerdmans, Jr. specializing in fiction and non-fiction for younger readers, from babies to young adults.

== See also ==
- New International Commentary on the New Testament
- New International Greek Testament Commentary

== Bibliography ==
- Kirch, Claire (September 30, 2011). "Eerdmans at 100: Building on Tradition". Publishers Weekly.
- Tenharmsel, Larry; Reinder Van Til (2011). An Eerdmans Century: 1911–2011. Grand Rapids, MI: Eerdmans. ISBN 978-0-8028-6658-5.
