= Edwin R. Thiele =

American archaeologist and professor (1895–1986)

- Born: September 10, 1895; Chicago, Illinois
- Died: April 15, 1986 (aged 90); St. Helena, California
- Resting place: Berrien Springs, Michigan
- Education: Emmanuel Missionary College
- Alma mater: Emmanuel Missionary College; University of Chicago
- Occupations: Archeologist, Scholar, Missionary
- Notable work: The Mysterious Numbers of the Hebrew Kings

Edwin Richard Thiele (10 September 1895 – 15 April 1986) was an American Seventh-day Adventist missionary in China, editor, archaeologist, writer, and scholar of the Old Testament. He is best known for his chronological studies of the kingdoms of Judah and Israel.

== Biography ==
Thiele was born on September 10, 1895 in Chicago, Illinois and grew up there. He graduated from Emmanuel Missionary College (which became Andrews University in 1960) in 1918 with a Bachelor of Arts degree in ancient languages. After two years of work as home missionary secretary for the East Michigan Conference of Seventh-day Adventists, he left in 1920 for mission service in China. During his 12 years in China, he was an editor and manager for the Signs of the Times Publishing House in Shanghai.

After returning to the United States, Thiele studied archaeology, obtaining a Master of Arts degree from the University of Chicago in 1937. He then joined the religion faculty of Emmanuel Missionary College while continuing his doctoral work at the University of Chicago. He obtained a PhD in biblical archaeology in 1943. His doctoral dissertation, The Chronology of the Kings of Judah and Israel, was later expanded and published as The Mysterious Numbers of the Hebrew Kings which became widely regarded as an important work on the chronology of Hebrew kings. He traveled extensively throughout the Middle East in the course of his research.

Later Thiele also authored a popular book on Christianity, Knowing God. After his death, his widow Margaret completed his study of the Book of Job entitled Job and the Devil.

From 1963 to 1965 he served as Professor of Antiquity at Andrews University. After retiring from teaching in 1965, he moved to California, where he continued to write. He died in St. Helena, California, in 1986. He is buried in Rose Hill Cemetery in Berrien Springs, Michigan.

== Reception of chronological work ==
Thiele's chronological reconstruction has not been accepted by all scholars. Nonetheless, the work of Thiele and those who followed in his steps achieved acceptance across a wider spectrum than that of any comparable chronology; as Assyriologist D. J. Wiseman (1993) wrote, "The chronology most widely accepted today is one based on the meticulous study by Thiele." More recently in 2010, Leslie McFall asserted that "Thiele's chronology is fast becoming the consensus view among Old Testament scholars, if it has not already reached that point."

Although criticism has been leveled at numerous specific points in Thiele's chronology, his work has won considerable praise even from those who disagree with his conclusions. On the other hand, even scholars sharing Thiele's religious convictions have sometimes maintained that there are weaknesses in his argument such as unfounded assumptions and assumed circular reasoning.

In his desire to resolve the discrepancies between the data in the Book of Kings, Thiele was forced to make improbable suppositions ... There is no basis for Thiele's statement that his conjectures are correct because he succeeded in reconciling most of the data in the Book of Kings, since his assumptions ... are derived from the chronological data themselves ...

In response to the "circular reasoning" criticism, Kenneth Strand has pointed out several archaeological finds that were published after Thiele produced his chronology and that verified Thiele's assumptions or conclusions as against the chronological systems of other scholars such as Albright that were posited before Thiele's work.

Despite the various criticisms Thiele's methodological treatment remains the typical starting point of scholarly treatments of the subject, and his work is considered to have established the date of the division of the Israelite kingdom.

== See also ==
- The Mysterious Numbers of the Hebrew Kings
- Old Testament: Timeline
- Historicity of the Bible
- Valerius Coucke
