= Jeroboam's Revolt =

Biblical civil war in Israel and Judah

- Part of the Israelite civil conflicts
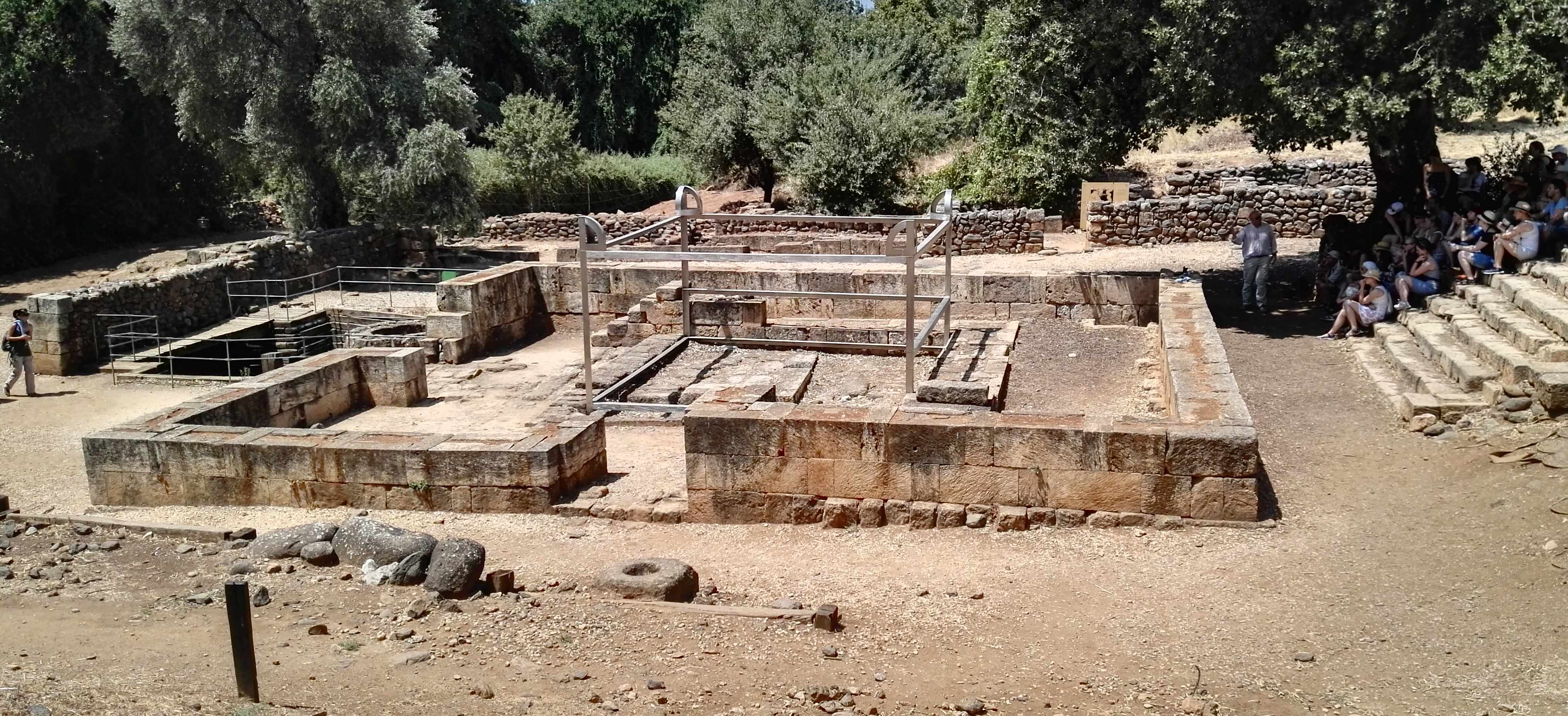
- Remains of Jeroboam's altar at Tel Dan, 2016
Date	c. 931–913 BCE
Location	Israel and Judah
Result	Israelite victory: Secession from the House of David by all Twelve Tribes of Israel, excluding Judah and Benjamin; Sacking of Judah's capital city Jerusalem by the Egyptian army
Territorial changes	Dissolution of the Kingdom of Israel and Judah into the Northern Kingdom (Israel) and the Southern Kingdom (Judah)

Belligerents
Kingdom of Israel; Dynasty XXII of Egypt	Kingdom of Judah

Commanders and leaders
Jeroboam; Shishak	Rehoboam; Abijah

Strength
800,000+ (Israelites); 72,000+ (Egyptians)	400,000+

Casualties and losses
500,000+ killed	Unknown, but fewer

According to the First Book of Kings and the Second Book of Chronicles of the Hebrew Bible, Jeroboam's Revolt was an armed insurrection against Rehoboam, king of the United Monarchy of Israel, and subsequently the Kingdom of Judah, led by Jeroboam in the late 10th century BCE. The conflict, referring to the independence of the Kingdom of Samaria and the subsequent civil war during Jeroboam's rule, is said to have begun shortly after the death of Solomon lasting until the Battle of Mount Zemaraim. The conflict began due to discontent under the rule of Solomon's successor, his son Rehoboam, and was waged with the goal of breaking away from the United Monarchy of Israel. Though this goal was achieved very early on in the conflict, the war continued throughout the duration of Rehoboam's reign and well into the reign of his son, Abijam, who defeated the armies of Jeroboam but failed to reunite the kingdoms.

Jeroboam had fled to Egypt decades prior to the war after Solomon tried to kill him following prophecies by Yahweh (1 Kings 11:9-13) and Ahijah (1 Kings 11:29-39) that God wanted Jeroboam to rule over ten of the twelve Tribes of Israel, and lived under the protection of the pharaoh Shishak, probably Shoshenq I. Following the news of Solomon's death in 931 BCE, Jeroboam ventured back to the kingdoms of Israel, now under the rule of Solomon's son Rehoboam. Rehoboam's rule had been comparatively less appreciated than his father's, having been advised to show no weakness to the people, and to tax them even more. Jeroboam, as part of a delegation, went before Rehoboam and petitioned for a cap on taxes, which Rehoboam refused. Following the rejection, ten of the tribes withdrew their allegiance to the House of David and proclaimed Jeroboam their king, forming Samaria. Only the tribes of Judah and Benjamin remained loyal to Rehoboam in the new kingdom of Judah.

The Battle of Mount Zemaraim in c. 913 BCE proved to be Jeroboam's final defeat, as the armies of Rehoboam's son Abijam reportedly killed half a million of Jeroboam's soldiers and captured the important Samarian centers of Bethel, Jeshanah, and Ephron, with their surrounding villages. Following this defeat, Jeroboam posed little threat to the Davidic kingdom, and died three years later. Despite defeating the separatist forces of the ten rebel tribes, the kingdoms of Judah and Samaria failed to be reunified in the wake of the war's end, and remained increasingly divided until being destroyed by invaders in 586 BCE and 720 BCE respectively.

== Biblical account ==
Jeroboam was the son of Nebat, a member of the Tribe of Ephraim of Zareda, and Zeruah. He had at least two sons—Abijah and Nadab, the latter of whom succeeded him on the throne of Samaria. While still a young man, King Solomon made him superintendent over his tribesmen in the building of the fortress Millo in Jerusalem and of other public works. Solomon's reign was characterized by extravagant projects that demonstrated the royal family's wealth, which caused widespread discontent among the people that Jeroboam naturally became conversant with. Solomon, apparently influenced by a prophecy that his kingdom would be divided due to his idolatrous practices and that the ten northern tribes would be given to "his servant", sought to kill Jeroboam. Jeroboam, however, escaped to Egypt, where he remained under the protection of pharaoh Shishak until Solomon's death. After Solomon's son Rehoboam assumed the throne, Jeroboam returned to Israel and participated in a delegation sent to ask the new king to reduce taxes. After Rehoboam rejected their petition, ten of the tribes withdrew their allegiance to the house of David, thus fulfilling the prophecies.

Jeroboam traveled north and rebuilt and fortified Shechem as the capital of the northern kingdom. Fearing that pilgrimages to the Temple in Jerusalem prescribed by the Torah might be an occasion for his people to go back to their old allegiance, he built two state temples, with golden calves, one in Bethel and the other in Dan. Although criticized for his heretical activities, Jeroboam engaged in offering incense at Bethel, when a "man of God" warned him that "a son named Josiah will be born to the house of David" who would destroy the altar.

Four years later, Jeroboam's former compatriot, Pharaoh Shishak, invaded Judah, leading an army of 60,000 horsemen and 1,200 chariots, in order to provide aid to Jeroboam. According to Josephus, his army met with no resistance throughout the campaign, taking Rehoboam's most fortified cities "without fighting." Finally, he conquered Jerusalem without resistance, because "Rehoboam was afraid." Shishak's forces stripped the city, including the Holy Temple, of Solomon's gold, which was later replaced with brass crafted by Rehoboam.

In the eighteenth year of Jeroboam's reign, Abijam, Rehoboam's son, became king of Judah. During his short reign of three years, Abijam went to considerable lengths to bring the Kingdom of Israel back under his control. He waged a major battle against Jeroboam on Mount Zemaraim, in Ephraim, using a force of 400,000, against Jeroboam's 800,000. Abijam addressed the armies of Israel, urging them to submit and to let the Kingdom of Israel be whole again, but his plea fell on deaf ears. Abijam's elite warriors fended off a pincer movement to rout Jeroboam's troops, killing 500,000 of them, while simultaneously annexing the towns of Bethel, Jeshanah, and Ephron, and their surrounding villages.

Jeroboam was crippled by this severe defeat to Abijam and posed little threat to the Kingdom of Judah for the rest of his reign. Abijam died two years later, with Jeroboam dying about a year after.

== Historicity ==
The matter of "proving" the revolt actually occurred is difficult. There is neither definitive proof nor disproof of a war of succession within Israelite society. While the existence of a true "united monarchy" of Israel is considered doubtful by some modern historians, there is no agreed theory on the historical origins of the independent kingdoms of Samaria and Judah. The matter of the historicity of the United Monarchy of Israel is central to ascertaining the historicity of Jeroboam's Revolt — if there was no unified state, there could not have been a succession conflict. The minimalist opinion is that the kingdoms of Samaria and Judah developed independently of one another, and that the narrative of a united Israelite monarchy and subsequent breakup is an invention of later writers, made in order to glorify David, and by extension the kingdom of Judah, which was finally codified into Israel's holy texts during the Babylonian exile. There are, however, some challenges to this theory. The Tel Dan Stele shows that the House of David was most likely a historical dynasty, and not a later literary invention. Line 9 of the stele is generally taken to mention a "house of David". Moreover, using source criticism, Albertz finds that both the northern kingdom of Israel (thus 8th century BCE or earlier) and the southern kingdom of Judah had traditions tracing their origins to a split in an earlier kingdom.

Excavations at Khirbet Qeiyafa and Gath show that large-scale urban civilizations were present in Judea during the timeframe of the United Monarchy, but they do not prove that such an entity existed. Likewise, the alleged empiric capital of Jerusalem shows few signs of such political power during this time. As a middle road, some accept the position of Israel Finkelstein and Neil Silberman, authors of The Bible Unearthed, who state that while David and Solomon may well be based on "certain historical kernels", their kingdom simply could not have been the biblical text's large, centralized, and opulent Israelite empire, based on the evidence available to us in the present day.

The existence of the revolt is not without its support. Amélie Kuhrt, while acknowledging a general lack of material evidence explicitly indicating a United Monarchy, concludes "[a]gainst this must be set the evidence for substantial development and growth at several sites, which is plausibly related to the tenth century." Kenneth Kitchen reaches a similar conclusion, arguing that "the physical archaeology of tenth-century Canaan is consistent with the former existence of a unified state on its terrain." Furthermore, levels IX and X of Tell Balata, a.k.a. Shechem, Jeroboam's first capital, show that the city was suddenly refurbished during the time period Jeroboam is believed to have reigned, circumstances which Edward F. Campbell Jr. called "tangible evidence of Jeroboam I's rebuilding (1 Kg 12:25) and a return to city status".

The pharaoh Sishak has been historically identified with Shoshenq I. Many inscriptions have been discovered which omit the n glyph from the pharaoh's name, however miscopyings and misspellings of pharaonic names are not at all uncommon in hieroglyphic sources. The Bubastite Portal, a relief discovered at Karnak, in Upper Egypt, and similar reliefs on the walls of a small temple of Amun at el-Hibeh, show Shoshenq I holding in his hand a bound group of prisoners. The names of captured towns are located primarily in the territory of the Kingdom of Israel (including Megiddo), with a few listed in the Negeb, and perhaps Philistia. Some of these include a few of the towns that Rehoboam had fortified according to Chronicles.

The portal is generally believed to record a historical campaign of Sheshonq I in Judah, but it makes no mention of Jerusalem being sacked, nor of Rehoboam or Jeroboam. Various explanations of this omission of Jerusalem have been proposed: its name may have been erased, the list may have been copied from an older pharaoh's list of conquests, or Rehoboam's ransoming the city (as described in the Book of Chronicles) would have saved it from being listed.

There are also some inconsistencies involving the dates of certain events. The calendars for reckoning the years of kings in Judah and Israel were offset by six months, that of Judah starting in Tishrei and that of Israel in Nisan. Cross-synchronizations between the two kingdoms therefore often allow narrowing of the beginning or ending dates of a king to within a six-month range. For Abijam, the scriptural data allow the narrowing of his accession to some time between 1 Nisan 914 BCE and the day before 1 Tishri of that year. For calculation purposes, this should be taken as the Judean year beginning in Tishri of 915/914 BC, or more simply 915 BCE. His death occurred at some time between 1 Tishri 912 BCE and 1 Nisan 911 BCE, i.e. in 912 (912/911) BCE. These dates are one year earlier than those given in the third edition of E. R. Thiele's Mysterious Numbers of the Hebrew Kings, thereby correcting an internal consistency that Thiele never resolved; Thiele's chronology for the first kings of Judah contained an internal inconsistency that later scholars corrected by dating these kings one year earlier, so that Abijam's dates are taken as 915/914 to 912/911 BCE in the present. In addition, Thiele produced 931/930 BC for the division of the kingdom when working backwards from the Battle of Qarqar in 853 BC. According to newer chronologists such as Gershon Galil and Kenneth Kitchen, however, the values are 931 BC for the beginning of the coregency and 915/914 BC for Rehoboam's death.

== See also ==
- List of Israelite civil conflicts

== Sources ==
- Albertz, Rainer (2018). "Secondary Sources Also Deserve to Be Historically Evaluated: The Case of the United Monarchy". In Grabbe, Lester L. (ed.). The Hebrew Bible and History: Critical Readings. Bloomsbury. pp. 367–379. ISBN 978-0-567-67268-1.
- Mykytiuk, Lawrence J. (2004). Identifying Biblical Persons in Northwest Semitic Inscriptions of 1200–539 B.C.E. Society of Biblical Literature. ISBN 9781589830622.
- Pioske, Daniel (2015). David's Jerusalem: Between Memory and History. Routledge Studies in Religion. Vol. 45. Routledge. ISBN 978-1317548911.
- Schmidt, Brian B. (2006). "Neo-Assyrian and Syro-Palestinian Texts I: the Tel Dan Inscription". In Chavalas, Mark William (ed.). The Ancient Near East: Historical Sources in Translation. John Wiley & Sons. ISBN 9780631235804.
