= Battle of Mount Zemaraim =

Ancient battle

- Part of Jeroboam's Revolt
- Map of the two kingdoms in the 9th century BC, prior to the battle
Date	913 BC
Location	Mount Zemaraim at the mountains of Ephraim, north of Jerusalem, Kingdom of Judah
Result	Decisive Judahite victory
Territorial changes	Israelites fail to invade Judah; Abijah fails to reunify the two kingdoms.

Belligerents
Kingdom of Judah	Kingdom of Israel

Commanders and leaders
King Abijah of Judah	King Jeroboam of Israel

Strength
400,000 warriors	800,000 warriors

Casualties and losses
Unknown	500,000 dead

The Battle of Mount Zemaraim was a battle in the Bible reported to have been fought in Mount Zemaraim, when the army of the Kingdom of Israel led by the king Jeroboam I encountered the army of the Kingdom of Judah led by the king Abijah I. About 500,000 Israelites were said to have lain dead after this single engagement, though most modern commentators consider the numbers to be either wildly exaggerated or symbolic, and some have even questioned its fundamental historicity.

== Biblical narrative ==
According to the scripture, the friction all began when the late king Rehoboam increased the royal taxes throughout the Kingdom of Israel after Solomon died in about 931 BC. This created discontent among all the Israelite tribes of the kingdom, excepting Judah and Benjamin, and the people's discontent soon became a rebellion when the king, against the advice of the elders, refused to lessen the burdens of royal taxation. The ten northern tribes of Israel eventually broke up from the kingdom and made a new Kingdom of Israel with the former fugitive and exile Jeroboam as king, provoking a civil war. Rehoboam then went to war against the new kingdom with a force of 180,000 soldiers, but was advised against fighting his brethren, so he returned to Jerusalem.

Ever since the unified kingdom was divided, there had been constant border issues between the two parties, and both attempted to settle them. Abijah succeeded to the throne after the death of his father Rehoboam, and attempted to reunite all of Israel, including Judah, under his rule. According to biblical sources, Abijah had an army of 400,000, all of them handpicked or conscripted, and Jeroboam had 800,000 warriors.

Before the battle, Abijah addressed the armies of Israel, urging them to submit and to let the Kingdom of Israel be whole again. Abijah then rallied his own troops with an address to all the people of Israel:

Listen to me, Jeroboam and all Israel: 5 "Do you not know that the LORD God of Israel gave the rule over Israel forever to David and his sons by a covenant of salt? 6 "Yet Jeroboam the son of Nebat, the servant of Solomon the son of David, rose up and rebelled against his master, 7 and worthless men gathered about him, scoundrels, who proved too strong for Rehoboam, the son of Solomon, when he was young and timid and could not hold his own against them. 8 "So now you intend to resist the kingdom of the LORD through the sons of David, being a great multitude and having with you the golden calves which Jeroboam made for gods for you. 9 "Have you not driven out the priests of the LORD, the sons of Aaron and the Levites, and made for yourselves priests like the peoples of other lands? Whoever comes to consecrate himself with a young bull and seven rams, even he may become a priest of what are no gods. 10 "But as for us, the LORD is our God, and we have not forsaken Him; and the sons of Aaron are ministering to the LORD as priests, and the Levites attend to their work. 11 "Every morning and evening they burn to the LORD burnt offerings and fragrant incense, and the showbread is set on the clean table, and the golden lampstand with its lamps is ready to light every evening; for we keep the charge of the LORD our God, but you have forsaken Him. 12 "Now behold, God is with us at our head and His priests with the signal trumpets to sound the alarm against you. O sons of Israel, do not fight against the LORD God of your fathers, for you will not succeed.

However, his plea to Jeroboam was not heeded. Jeroboam had set up an ambush to come from the rear of Abijah's army, so that the latter's army would be fighting on his army's front and rear, executing a giant pincer movement. All of the soldiers of Judah pleaded to God for help, and then the priests blew the trumpets. Abijah was quick in countering this move made by Jeroboam; he ordered his warriors to fight bravely and countered the pincer movement executed by Jeroboam to his warriors, almost utterly crushing the latter's huge army.

King Abijah and the warriors of Judah who were under his command had won, killing 500,000 Israelite warriors in the process. The rest of the Israelite army fled from the battlefield heading back north, and the forces of Judah then staged a relentless pursuit against them, taking the cities of Bethel, Jeshanah and Ephron during the ensuing pursuit. The factor for Judah's success in the battle is mainly attributed to Abijah and his troops' devotion to their God.

Jeroboam was crippled by this severe defeat to Abijah and thus posed little threat to the Kingdom of Judah for the rest of his reign; however, despite being victorious, Abijah failed to reunify Israel and Judah.

== Historicity ==
Most modern historians consider the numbers to be either wildly exaggerated or symbolic, and some have even questioned the battle's fundamental historicity. A chronology proposed by Edwin Thiele suggests the battle would have taken place around 913 BC.

Yohanan Aharoni, in his book The Carta Bible Atlas, claims that the battle of Mount Zemariam was actually part of the fratricidal war that lasted throughout the reigns of Rehoboam, Abijah, and Asa. According to him, most of the battles took place in the territory of the tribe of Benjamin, including the battle of Mount Zemariam.

== In Rabbinic literature ==
Despite the miraculous victory described in the Bible, Rabbinic literature criticizes Abijah's actions in this war. Regarding the verse that appears at the end of the war "Jeroboam did not regain power during the time of Abijah. And the Lord struck him down and he died." (2 Chronicles 13:20), Rabbi Samuel ben Nahman said "You think that Jeroboam was struck down, but no, it was Abijah who was struck down." The Midrash lists three sins of Abijah for which he was struck, according to this interpretation. Rabbi Johanan bar Nappaha said that by referring to Jeroboam's rebellion against Rehoboam as a rebellion of "villains" (בני בליעל) even though Ahijah the Shilonite took part in it, he humiliated Ahijah. Rabbi Shimon ben Lakish said that Abijah sinned in his speech describing the sins of the Kingdom of Israel, because in doing so he publicly shamed the people of Israel. Another opinion refers specifically to Abijah's activities after the victory, and criticizes the fact that after the conquest of Beth El, Abijah did not destroy the golden calf that Jeroboam had set up there.

In addition, Abijah's is described as cruel. The Rabbinical text interpreted "a great blow" (2 Chronicles 13:17) to mean that Abijah was not satisfied with killing the Israelite warriors, but also ensured that the bodies could not be identified.

== See also ==
- Battle of Qarqar
- Northern Kingdom of Israel
- Kingdom of Judah
- Neo-Assyrian Empire
- List of battles before 301
- List of Israelite civil conflicts
