= Irgun and Lehi internment in Africa =

British deportation of Zionist militias

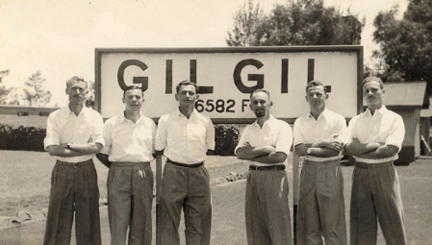
Irgun detainees in the Gilgil internment camp, Kenya (from left to right: Aryeh Mehullal, Reuven (Robert) Rubinstein, Zvi Hadassi, Dov HaLevi Milman, Shmuel Tamir (Katznelson), Meir Shamgar (Sternberg)).

From 1944 to 1948, Irgun and Lehi men being held without trial at the Latroun camp were deported by the British Mandate of Palestine authorities to internment camps in Africa, located in Sembel (near Asmara, Eritrea), Carthago, Sudan and Gilgil (north of Nairobi, Kenya). The deportees were returned in July 1948, only after the Israeli Declaration of Independence.

== The deportation ==
=== The decision ===
The decision to deport the underground members to Africa was made by the British following the radicalization of their activities and the recommendation of the chief secretary, substitute of the High Commissioner, John Shaw. After several successful escapes from the Latroun camp, the chance of them recurring in Africa seemed smaller. The British also believed the deportation to have a strong deterring element. The proponents of the decision did not believe it to be a substitute for the political solution of dividing the land, but hoped it would weaken the underground forces and allow the moderate Jewish forces to promote a compromising solution.

=== The execution ===
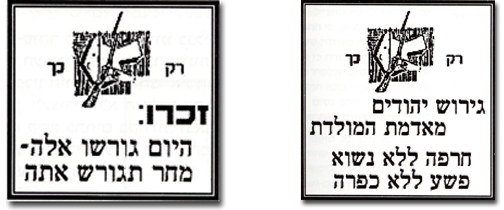
Irgun posters. Left: "Remember: Today it's them, tomorrow it's you who shall be deported". Right: "Banishment of Jews from their homeland - unpredicated disgrace, unforgivable crime".

"Operation Snowball" was executed in one day, October 19, 1944, with speed and surprise. The detainees in Latroun were put on board airplanes. The first wave included 251 detainees and eventually a total of 439 men, approximately half of the underground detainees, were deported. According to estimations, approximately 60 percent of them were Irgun men, 30 percent were Lehi members and the rest neutral.

The undergrounds reacted strongly and denounced the deportation, and intended to carry out an armed struggle to force the Mandatory government to return the deportees. In fact, the assassination of Lord Moyne by Lehi men brought about "The Hunting Season". The Yishuv institutions' protest was feeble, if existing at all. This raised suspicions among the detainees that the Jewish Agency might be involved in the deportation plans.

=== The legal struggle ===
Irgun men, headed by Aryeh Ben-Eliezer, appealed to the Supreme Court which accepted their claims in part, noting that the rendition was unauthorized, but that the arrest was nevertheless legitimate, since it was enforced by a warrant from the Eritrean government. Despite the legal setback, it was a moral victory which led the local newspapers to disfavor the deportation. Most of the detainees were not tried and were interned by the power of the emergency regulations, according to which they could be arrested based on mere suspicion, a fact that was criticized in the internal British correspondence as well.

== The conditions of internment ==
The conditions in the Sembel camp were not inferior to the ones in Latroun, despite the lack of many means of convenience, from books to clothes and toothbrushes. For religious, national honor, and provocation reasons, the detainees insisted on receiving kosher food, and eventually kosher meat was brought to them from the Jewish community of Khartoum.

The conditions were worse in the Carthago camp, to which they were taken in early 1945, mostly due to the heat and lack of water. Yishuv officials who tried to intercede on behalf of the detainees were told that the complaints were completely made up. The detainees stayed there for nine months, and then taken back to Sembel.

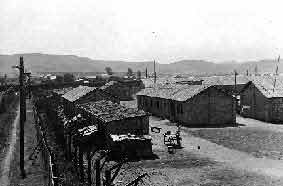
The Gilgil camp.

Things were not much better in the third camp, the one in Gilgil, where they were held from March 1947. Formerly a military prison, the place contained dark and suffocating cells and was full of mosquitoes and sewage water. A mutinous act by the detainees, in which they demolished a wall to cover the drainage finally convinced the camp commander to improve their conditions.

The British encouraged extensive educational activity, including language classes by detainee Uzzi Ornan. Others, including Meir Shamgar and Shmuel Tamir, studied law through correspondence with British universities.

=== The bloody incident ===
Relations with the command staff were generally good, albeit with one notable exception. On January 17, 1946, in the Sembel camp, Sudanese guards shot and killed two detainees, Irgun member Eliyahu Ezra and Lehi member Shaul Hagalili. The incident started when Ezra refused to back off from a fence as ordered, and he was shot and wounded. Other detainees carried Ezra to the gate for transfer to a first aid station outside the camp. When the guards refused to let them out, the detainees began banging on the gate, causing the guards to open fire, killing Ezra and Hagalili and wounding 12 others. The gate was then opened, and the wounded were evacuated to a military hospital. For reasons that remain unclear, the British refused to transfer the bodies to burial in Eretz Israel. Ezra and Hagalili were temporarily buried in the Jewish cemetery of Asmara. Their bodies were transferred to Israel for burial in 1949.

The Yishuv was infuriated, and demanded the appointment of an inquiry committee, but the British army insisted that the guards behaved correctly. Rabbi Yitzhak HaLevi Herzog was eventually sent to the camp as moderator, and his activity was more satisfactory to the British than the detainees.

=== Red Cross investigation ===
American Zionist activists persuaded International Committee of the Red Cross to intervene on the detainees behalf, and, unwilling to rebuff a request from such an esteemed organization, the British Colonial Office allowed a Red Cross official to visit a detention facility in Eritrea in June 1946. His report found the conditions to be mostly satisfactory. However, he also noted that many of the detainees were suffering from a deterioration in their physical and mental health. The dry climate and high altitude was causing anxiety and insomnia, which in turn led to chronic heart and pulmonary problems. Many who had been detained indefinitely without ever being charged, including those detained for years, had despaired of ever going free, and he found that this was causing mental health problems such as acute anxiety and hysteria among some detainees.

== Escape attempts ==
=== First attempts ===
The first attempt was made at Sembel in January 1945, when three detainees buried themselves in an athletics field. When the guards left it at night, they came out and went to Asmara. A man from the Jewish community tried to help them, but they were caught at a British checkpoint when they took a bus to the border.

The second attempt, in March 1945, at Carthago, consisted of a run to the hills by three Lehi men, but without a plan they were caught in no time.

The third attempt, in September 1945, was carefully planned. Three men, including Yitzhak Shamir and Yaakov Meridor, who was so eager to escape he did not try to use his senior position in the Irgun to become a leader in the camp, tried to hide in water tanks and bribe the Sudanese driver transporting them. They traveled across Sudan, using fabricated British Intelligence certificates. The certificates finally aroused the suspicion of a train conductor in Khartoum, who called the security service, which caught them six days after their escape.

=== Attempts in Asmara ===
The fourth attempt was made in Sembel in November 1945. It was relatively spontaneous and based mostly on trust put in the assistance of the local Jewish community. Their trust paid off, and two escapees arrived in Ethiopia, disguised as Arab women. There, they were arrested and placed in Ethiopian prisons. The Ethiopian emperor, Haile Selassie was pressured by the British as well as Jews, and eventually agreed to turn them in, perhaps in exchange for an imprisoned family member. A third escapee stayed in Eritrea and was caught. The fourth escapee, Eliyahu Lankin, who further utilized local Jews, was jailed in Addis Ababa, but was released thanks to interceding with the emperor. In early 1947 he became the only escapee to arrive in Europe before 1948.

The fifth attempt, in July 1946 in Asmara, was a mass one. Two deep tunnels were dug. 54 out of 150 detainees who were to escape were divided into two groups, one to be headed by Meridor and the other by Shlomo Lev-Ami. The first was to wander to Ethiopia using carefully made British uniform costumes. The other was to hide in Asmara. The first group was soon caught. They kept their promise and did not resist. The second group managed to hide for a longer while. Five of them, including Shamgar, tried to hide in an oil tanker but were caught. The British managed to trace a few more of them through the Jewish community, but some remained at large.

The sixth attempt, in September 1946 in Sembel, once again included Meridor and another Irgun man, was made by breaking holes in the ceilings. Meridor and his comrade escaped and met with the remaining escapees from the fifth attempt. They were all eventually caught by the British intelligence.

=== The seventh attempt ===
This attempt, in Sembel, took advantage of the superficial blocking of one of the tunnels dug in the fifth attempt. The detainees dug a short tunnel to bypass the block. Meridor was once again involved, along with four others, including Shamir. Using The Asmaran Jews was no longer an option, but through the camp's Rabbi an Italian Jew, Dr. Giuseppe Levi, was contacted. He assisted them in finding shelter for a fee with an Italian national in Asmara.

After over a month in hiding they arrived, after many hardships, in Addis Ababa. Two of them, Shamir and Ben-Eliezer, turned to Djibouti, with the help of a local Rabbi. On arrival, they were anticipated by British policemen, but the French were reluctant to turn them in, and they used fabricated South American certificates to demand their release. They were eventually transferred to France, using the Irgun's excellent contacts with French government officials, and were released in early May 1948.

The other three were returned to the camp in August 1947, after a long hiding period in Addis Ababa and just before boarding a plane chartered by Irgun supporters to get them to Paris.

=== The eighth attempt ===
The eighth and last attempt took place in Gilgil in late March 1948. The attempt was controversial, considering the previous failures, and even the Irgun commander Menachem Begin's support was tepid.

Once again it was led by Meridor and involved digging a tunnel. Using improvised printing machines and the Larousse Encyclopedia, El Salvador and Honduras passports were forged, complete with replications of their symbols. The stamps were manufactured from erasers. The plan also involved the support of two Rabbis, detainee David Kahane, and the Johannesburg Rabbi, Louis Isaac Rabinowitz, who smuggled in vital information.

Having crawled to the other side of the fence, a ride was there to take them to the Uganda. From there, they made it to Belgian Congo. From that point on, the flight to Brussels went smoothly, and by early April the six Irgun men were free.

Another escape attempt was planned, but was thwarted once the success of the previous one was published. Unaware of the fact that the escapees were already safely in Europe, the British authorities in Eritrea launched searches for them in Kenya.

== Return to Israel ==
Despite the British intention of leaving Palestine, by the end of 1947 the British were still reluctant to return the detainees. The authorities were concerned that they might attack the British from behind, assuming that the British might go back on their word once the violent struggle were over.

Even after the declaration of independence, the British still postponed the detainees' return, despite their protests. The reason given was the need for keeping the truce rules, which included banning the entrance of young men eligible for military service. An additional difficulty arose from the need to get them across the Suez Canal via Egypt, which would have no reason to allow this. Another factor that might have affected the decision was a pro-Arab line of Ernest Bevin, the Foreign Secretary. Oppositely, the governor of Kenya was afraid of riots and put pressure on the British authorities to get them out of the country.

Eventually, it was Folke Bernadotte who decreed that their return would not violate the truce. Despite the Altalena affair, the Israeli authorities expressed an unequivocal support of their return, although Moshe Sharett did not rule out the option of arresting them immediately on arrival, fearing that they might subvert the government.

The final decision was made following a question by Samuel Segal. On July 9, the ship boarding the detainees set sail to Israel and arrived three days later. They were not greeted by any formal ceremony and quickly took part in the 1948 Arab–Israeli War.

Before departure, the detainees were asked by the camp commander Colonel Rice to reveal the location of the tunnel through with the seven detainees including Shamir had escaped. Shmuel Tamir agreed to tell Rice the location of the tunnel, but only after returning to Israel, as the detainees were not sure that they really would reach Israel after being let go, and foresaw a risk of once again ending up in the prison camp. After arrival in Israel, Shmuel Tamir kept his promise and sent a letter to Rice, telling him the location of the tunnel.

== Bibliography ==
- Eliash, Shulamit (1996). Irgun and Lehi in exile: In the internment camps in Africa, 1944-1948 (in Hebrew). Ramat-Gan: Bar-Ilan University Press. ISBN 978-965-226-155-7.
- Meridor, Yaakov (1985). Long is the road to freedom (1st U.S. ed.). Distributed by Sparks & Co. p. 363. ISBN 0-933447-00-0.
- Omer, Devorah (1976). The escape to freedom (in Hebrew). Karni. p. 243.
