= Lankin =

Surname list

Lankin may refer to

== Surname ==
- Dmitriy Lankin (born in 1997), Russian artistic gymnast
- Eliyahu Lankin (1914–1994), Israeli politician
- Frances Lankin (born in 1954), Canadian politician
