= The Saison =

1944–1945 operation in Mandatory Palestine

- Part of the Jewish insurgency in Mandatory Palestine
Date	November 1944 – March 1945
Location	Mandatory Palestine
Result	Haganah operations against the Irgun halted due to internal opposition Irgun insurgency temporarily halted

Belligerents
Haganah United Kingdom	Irgun Lehi

Commanders and leaders
David Ben-Gurion (United Kingdom) Lord Gort	Menachem Begin Yitzhak Shamir

Strength
unknown	unknown

Casualties and losses
	Hundreds arrested

The Saison (short for French: la saison de chasse, "hunting season"; Hebrew: הסזון) was the name given to the Haganah's attempt to suppress the Irgun's insurgency against the government of Palestine during the Mandate period, from November 1944 to March 1945, as ordered by the official bodies of Jews already living there.

== History ==
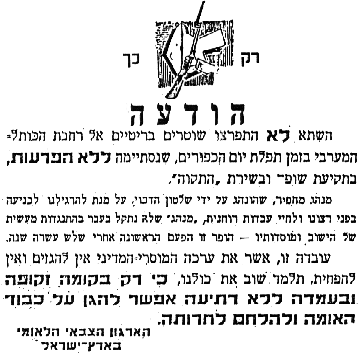
Irgun poster on its actions to keep British forces from disturbing the Yom Kippur prayer at Western Wall

At the outbreak of World War II the Yishuv was torn between its fight against the British for free Aliyah and a Hebrew state, and the desire to join them against Nazi Germany. The Jewish Agency Chairman David Ben-Gurion called to "fight the war as if there was no White Paper and fight the White Paper as if there was no war". Indeed, by 1940, the Irgun ceased its activities against the British mandatory regime and sent its men to assist the British in several missions, one of which, in May 1941, resulted in the death of its commander, David Raziel, in Iraq.

In 1943, as the tide was shifting in favor of the Allies, the Agency decided to assist the British in any possible way, hoping to gain political benefits after the war. The Irgun and Lehi opposed the decision, which resulted in a heated confrontation.

In February 1944, the Irgun and Lehi began an insurrection against the British, and Irgun commander Menachem Begin declared a "Revolt" against the British Mandate, stating that the British had betrayed the Yishuv's trust and that denial of Jewish immigration was a crime. Therefore, Irgun announced its intention to fight the British in order to drive them out of the Land of Israel. Ben Gurion and the Agency objected and started a public struggle to force the Irgun and Lehi to cease such activities.

Between February and November 1944 the parties negotiated but to no avail. Despite Begin informing Eliyahu Golomb in October that "We have no intention of seizing power in the Yishuv. We have said this on many occasions. We have no such ambitions... we think that Ben-Gurion is the man who can lead our youth into battle today", the Jewish Agency's leadership regarded the issue as an important power struggle, and the Haganah forces started preparing for a possible armed conflict.

== Decision ==
Due to the increasing level of violence and number of Irgun actions, and to lesser extent, of Lehi as well, Yehuda Bauer writes (on page 275 in the Hebrew edition of his study, "From Diplomacy to Resistance") that the decision to go forward with an anti-Irgun operation was taken in late September/early October 1944. The men selected belonged to the Shai, the Haganah's intelligence unit, and the Palmach. On October 20, training courses opened for 170 volunteers. According to a document dated October 29, 1944 and sent from the office of the Head of the National Command (HaRaMa) of the Haganah to the regional command officers, an anti-Irgun operation was about to be authorized. In a last-ditch effort to avoid a confrontation, Haganah officials Moshe Sneh and Eliyahu Golomb met with Irgun officials Menachem Begin and Eliyahu Lankin in Tel Aviv, unsuccessfully attempting to persuade them to cease their militant campaign. At the end of the meeting, Golomb warned Begin and Lankin that "we shall step in and finish you."

On November 6, 1944, Lehi members Eliyahu Hakim and Eliyahu Bet-Zuri assassinated the British Resident Minister of state, Lord Moyne. This was the last straw as far as the Agency was concerned, and it made a series of decisions to curb Irgun and Lehi:

- Firing suspects of membership from workplaces and expelling them from schools.
- Denial of members of shelter and sanctuary
- Withholding funds for their activities
- Cooperation with the British struggle against them

== Implementation ==
Haganah leaders placed in charge included Yigal Allon, Moshe Dayan, Yisrael Galili, Moshe Sneh, Yaakov Dori, Eliyahu Golomb and Teddy Kollek. A special force was made out of Palmach and SHAI men, some of whom were specifically trained for the mission. It was commanded by Shimon Avidan.

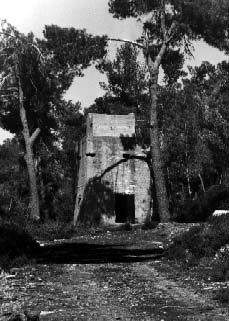
Watch-Tower at Kiryat Anavim used as a jail for Irgun members

The Saison unit began following Irgun members for reconnaissance. A list of Irgun donors that was found was handed over to the British. Unit squadrons detained Irgun members in hiding places in Kibbutzim (Ein Harod, Mishmar HaEmek and Alonim, among others). Irgun vice commander Ya'akov Meridor was even handed over to the British while Eli Tavin, the head of Irgun intelligence, was held in solitary confinement by the Haganah in a barn at kibbutz Ein Harod for about six months, during which he was subjected to beatings and mock executions. Some testimonies suggested violent inquisitions and severe internment conditions. In addition to the kidnappings, dozens of Irgun members and supporters were fired from their jobs and their children were expelled from their schools.

The Irgun refused to cease action against the British. Begin ordered his men not to react violently in order to prevent a "fraternal war". At that point the conflict worsened as the Agency ordered the Haganah to hand Irgun men to the British. Obedience to that order was purely voluntary, and some Haganah members were relieved of their duties for refusing to go along with it. Nevertheless, there was partial cooperation between the Agency's "department for special tasks" and the Palestine Police in the struggle against the Irgun.

During the Saison, the "department for special tasks" provided the British with information regarding several hundred Irgun members and armories. The transfer of information was conducted mostly by Teddy Kollek, who had direct contact with MI5. Thanks to that information, several Irgun leaders and hundreds of its members were arrested and some were even deported to detainment camps in Africa (mostly in Eritrea). There is also evidence suggesting that the Agency used the Saison for political motives, naming members of the Revisionist Party who weren't Irgun members. A letter from the High Commissioner to the Minister of Colonies dating March 1, 1945, read: "Unfortunately, the Jewish Agency's lists of so-called terrorists continues to include numerous people who have no terror connections, but politically speaking are undesirable to the Jewish Agency. This adds to the difficulties the police has in separating the sheep from the goats […]".

Despite the efforts, Begin's hiding place was not found. Still, the Irgun was severely affected by the Saison and by the end of February 1945, the main aim – a cessation of action against the British – had been achieved. Subsequently, protests increased among the Yishuv against the Saison and by the end of March the Agency aborted it. In May 1945 the Irgun resumed its activities against the British, although to a lesser extent. In late October 1945 the Jewish Resistance Movement was established, joining Haganah, Irgun and Lehi together in a violent struggle against the British Mandate.

== The "Little Saison" ==
The "Little Saison" refers to the actions undertaken by the Haganah in the spring and summer of 1947, meant to sabotage the Irgun and Lehi insurgencies against the British when Palestine was handed to the UN and UNSCOP. This time, the Haganah did not collaborate with the Mandate and didn't hand people over. During this period, unlike the first, the Irgun did, on occasion, take countermeasures. In one instance, a Haganah member was killed by an explosive device while foiling a potentially catastrophic attack against Citrus House.

The term is also used in reference to the actions by Irgun against Lehi in 1940, during the Avraham Stern split. The Irgun leadership gave the British the Lehi leaders' hiding place and many of them were arrested.

== Legacy ==
Some regard the Saison as one of the biggest moments of crisis faced by the Yishuv, setting it on the brink of a civil war, together with the Altalena affair. Others think that, by being a decisive step in establishing the Jewish Agency's position as the sole leader of the Yishuv, the Saison made possible the establishment of the State of Israel without a violent sectarian struggle. It has also been seen as a "minor civil war" which vaccinated the Israeli society.

The Season left its mark on the Israeli political discourse in the following decades. It is sometimes linked to the tension between Herut and Mapai, specifically between their respective leaders, Begin and Ben Gurion. Ben Gurion would address Begin as "The MK sitting to the right of MK Bader" and mention "the sacred cannon" which opened fire on the Altalena. He would also say "without Herut and Maki" in reference to his potential coalition parties.

The Season was mentioned by the Israeli right in the context of Israel's unilateral disengagement plan, and parallels were also drawn between the Season and the Fatah–Hamas conflict in the Israeli occupied territories. Meretz MK Avshalom Vilan described in an interview the situation prior to the disengagement as one in which "Arik Sharon will have to make a Ben-Gurion-like decision. He will not be able to go on juggling all the balls in the air. It's an Altalena situation...The government has to make it clear that it has cannons. And rifles. And that it is ready to use them...the security cabinet will be ready to make the same tough decision that Ben-Gurion made in the face of the Altalena."

== See also ==
- Altalena Affair
