= Zionist Horizon =

Israeli organization

Hazon Leumi
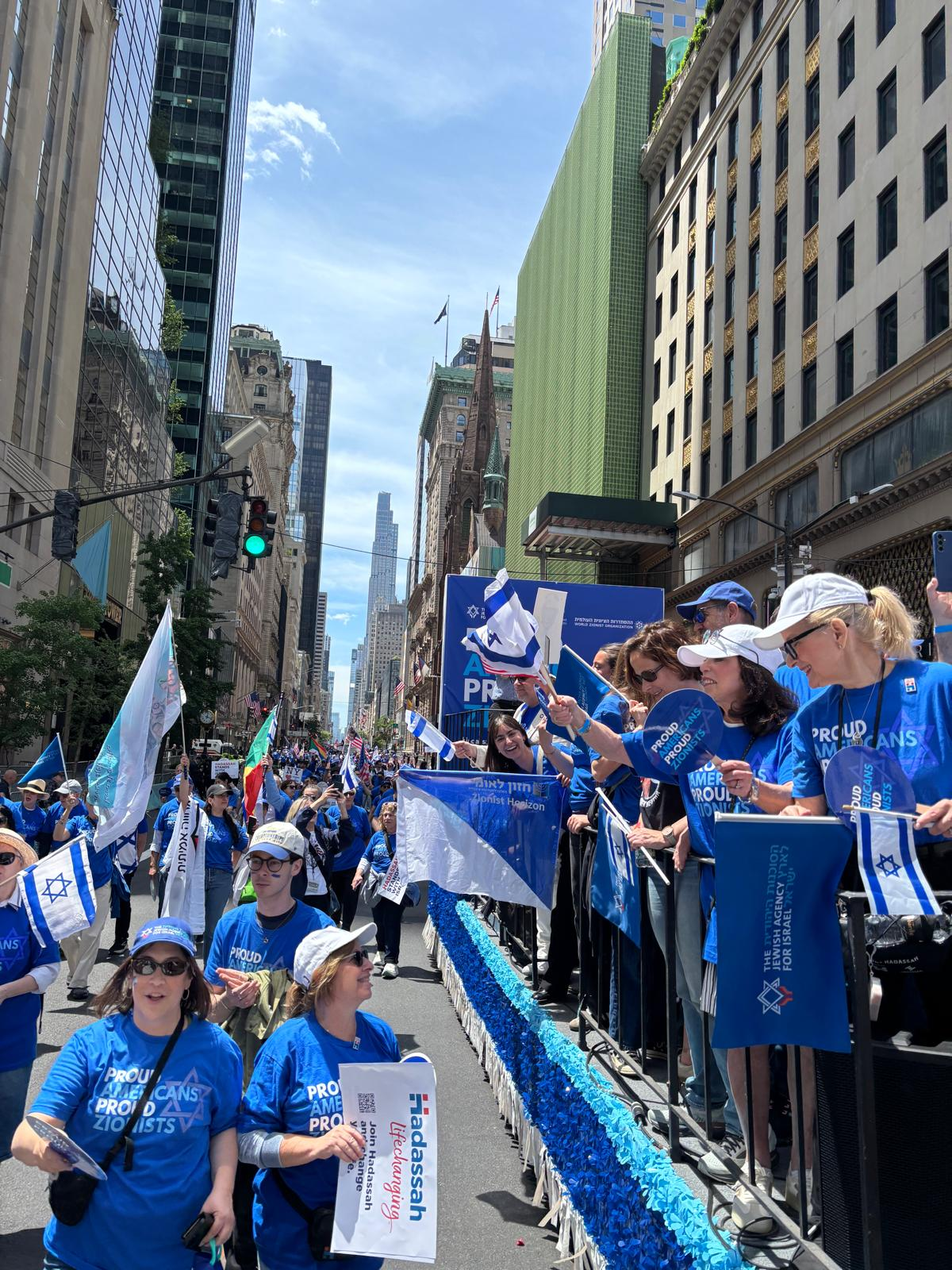
- Zionist Horizon Organization at the Israel Parade in New York 2026
- Formation: 2013
- Type: Non-governmental organization
- Registration no.: 580594158
- Key people: Ariel Kallner (Founder)
- Website: https://hazonleumi.co.il/

Hazon Leumi is an Israeli organization operating in Israel and around the world by implementing training, activities and programs on the topics of Zionism, Hasbara, combating anti-Semitism, and conservative approaches in the fields of economics, law, and society.

The core activities of the organization are annual programs for groups of young people and students who meet weekly for lectures, workshops and tours from a national-conservative perspective.

== History ==
=== Establishment of the Organization ===
In 2013, a group of activists led by Ariel Kallner (Likud) founded the organization together, setting a goal of shaping the leadership of the next generation with a Zionist-national spirit. After being elected to the 21st Knesset, Kallner resigned from the organization and was replaced by Dor Harlap as the chairman of the organization.

=== Activities of the Organization ===
The organization's activities focus on deepening Zionist awareness through Zionist, conservative values by means of discussions, lectures, workshops and tours, with the aim of encouraging students to later engage in public and social action.

Every year, the organization conducts tours for student groups and open public tours in south Tel Aviv (led by Sheffi Paz) and the West Bank, including Hebron Hills and East Jerusalem. Weekly lectures are held in the 'Public Leadership Program' where regular lecturers include Mordechai Kedar, Retired Major General Uzi Dayan, Gadi Taub, Gustavo Perednik, Yoram Ettinger, Eran Bartal and Yehuda Yifrach.

The organization holds an annual ceremony commemorating the Altalena affair.

In 2017, Knesset member Stav Shaffir referred to Zionist Horizon as "an organization that persecutes academics" and that "it is an arm of the Independence Heritage Fund" Following this, the then-chairman of the organization, Ariel Kallner, appealed to the chairman of the Ethics Committee, requesting that he instruct MK Stav Shaffir to apologize for the "false claims."

During the Gaza war, the organization was involved in various public advocacy campaigns in support of Israel, in Israel and abroad.

=== 2025-2026 ===
During both 2025 and 2026, the organization operated Zionism and leadership study centers in the cities of Lod, Jerusalem, Acre, Petah Tikva, and the settlement Har Bracha. In addition, the organization participated in the Fifth Avenue Israel Day Parade in New York and the Arutz Sheva Jerusalem Conference in New York, and conducted advocacy delegations for students in New York, Vienna, Rome, and Hungary.
