= Ariel Kallner =

Israeli politician

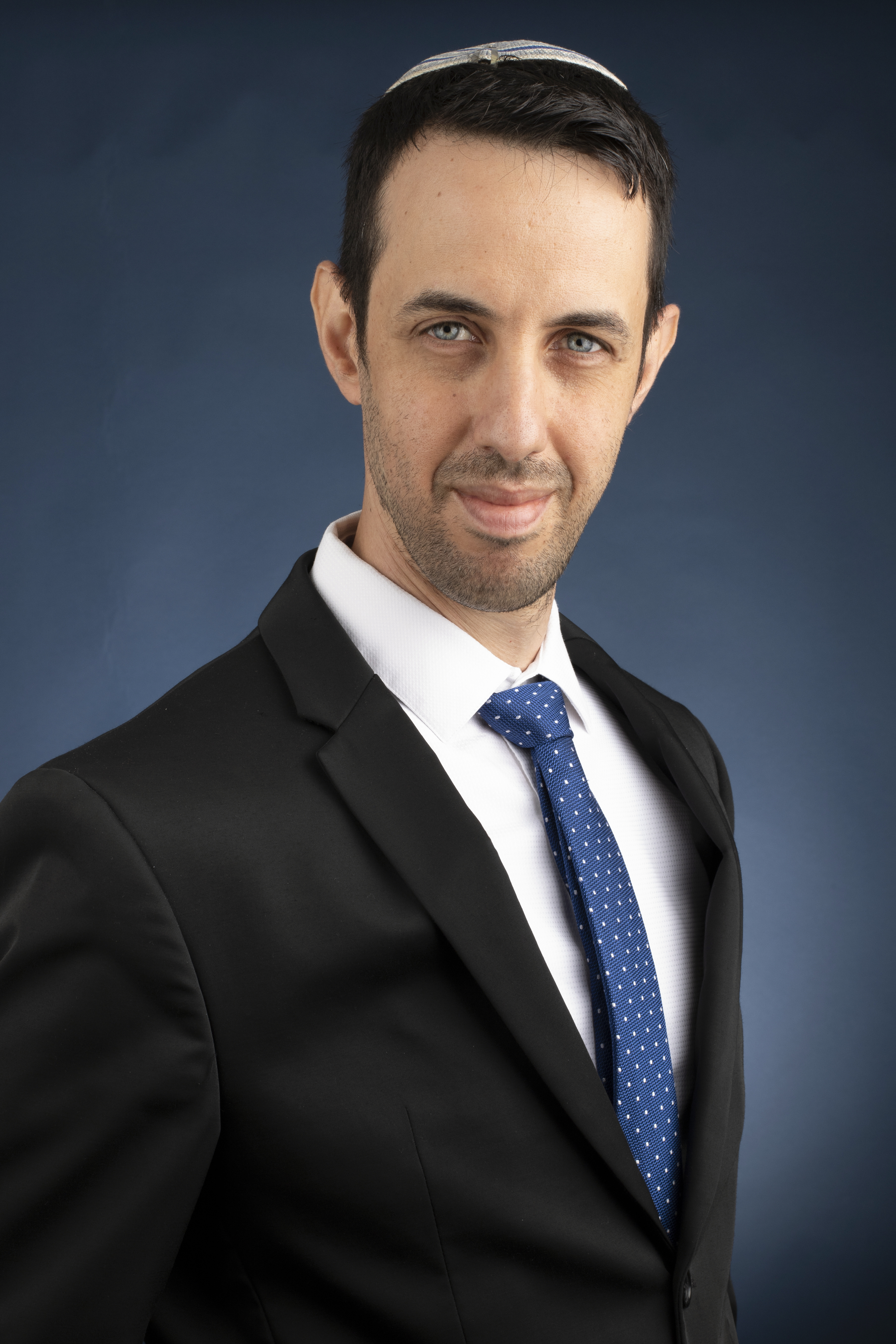
- Kallner in 2020

Faction represented in the Knesset
- 2019: Likud
- 2020–2021: Likud
- 2023–2026: Likud

Personal details
- Born: 5 July 1980 (age 46) Haifa, Israel

Ariel Kallner (Hebrew: אריאל קלנר; born 5 July 1980) is an Israeli politician. He has served as a member of the Knesset for Likud from April to September 2019, between 2020 and 2021 and from 2023 to 2026.

== Early life and education ==
Kallner was born into a secular family in Haifa on 5 July 1980, the oldest of three brothers, and attended the Hebrew Reali School.

His national service in the Israel Defense Forces saw him serve as a combat medic in the Golani Brigade, during which time he became religious. He subsequently attended the Technion and earned an MBA at the University of Haifa.

== Political career ==
Whilst at the Technion, he established the anti-disengagement movement known as the orange cell, and was elected chair of the Likud Youth Movement in 2004.

In 2013 he established Hazon Leumi – The Center for Zionist Leadership, which set itself the goal of shaping the leadership of the next generation in a Jewish-Zionist-national spirit.

=== Knesset career ===
Kallner was placed thirty-fourth on the Likud list in the April 2019 election, and was elected to the Knesset after the party won 35 seats. In June 2019, Kallner and fellow Likud MK Michal Shir unsuccessfully sued to prevent Likud's merger with Kulanu. Kallner went on to lose his seat in the September 2019 election after Likud was reduced to 31 seats.

Kallner failed to regain his seat in the 2020 legislative election. However, re-entered the Knesset on 5 July 2020 to replace Tzipi Hotovely, who resigned her seat under the Norwegian Law following her appointment to the cabinet. In late July 2020, Kallner publicly opposed an effort to rename a street in Haifa in honor of Egyptian singer Umm Kulthum. Placed thirty-third on the Likud list in the 2021 elections, he lost his seat as Likud was reduced to 30 seats.

He re-entered the Knesset in January 2023, replacing Haim Katz. In February 2023, the Knesset Education, Culture and Sports Committee held a committee hearing at Kallner's behest over alleged censorship of right-wing views on Israeli university campuses. Following a clash in April 2023 in which Israeli forces killed a 15 year old Palestinian child in the Aqbat Jaber refugee camp in Jericho, West Bank, Kallner was quoted by CNN as saying "The land of Israel belongs to the people of Israel, belongs to us... I think that those who live here, the Arabs and so on, they can live here. But it's our land." In May 2023 Kallner proposed a bill to institute a 65% tax on donations to non-governmental organizations (NGO) accused of "interfering in Israel's internal affairs." Kallner was one of three Likud MKs, along with Dan Illouz and Amit Halevi to go up to the Temple Mount alongside MKs from the far-right Otzma Yehudit party.

In December 2025, Kallner introduced a bill to establish a "National State Committee of Inquiry" to examine the events of 7 October, 2023. He proposed this committee as an alternative to a State Committee of Inquiry, which the government and coalition had opposed. The proposal outlined a six-member body composed of three coalition representatives and three opposition representatives. Kallner stated that the commission would examine all branches of government, including the political, security, and judicial levels. The proposal drew significant criticism from opposition figures and bereaved families. . The "October Council", representing more than 1,500 bereaved families and survivors, described the proposal as a "political cover-up committee"

== Political views ==
Kallner has been described as a "hard-right member of Netanyahu's own Likud party" by The Times of Israel owing to his championing of a controversial bill that would have hindered the ability of NGOs to receive foreign funding.

In the days following the October 7 attacks in the Gaza envelope, Kallner called for Israel to bring about a second Nakba. In a post on social media platform X, Kallner advocated for a "Nakba that will overshadow the Nakba of '48", calling for a "Nakba in Gaza and Nakba to anyone who dares to join." He publicly supported and joined the initiatives of Uri Tzafon, a far-right movement advocating the settlement of Southern Lebanon.

== Personal life ==
Kallner is married with four children and lives in Haifa.
