= Altalena affair =

Confrontation between the IDF and Irgun in 1948

Coordinates: 32°04′43″N 34°45′53″E

Altalena Affair
- Part of the 1948 Arab–Israeli War
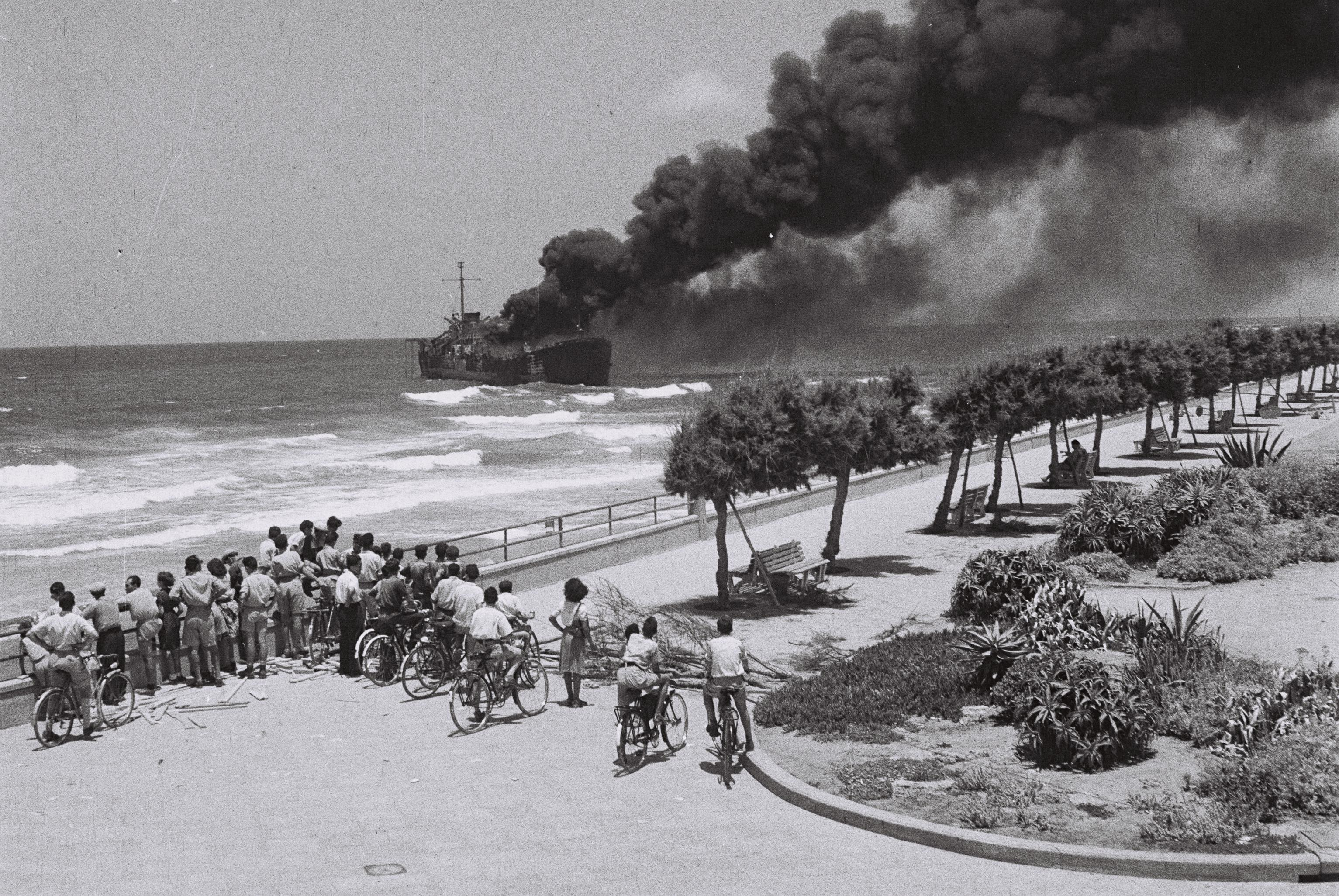
- Altalena on fire after being shelled near Tel Aviv
Date	20–23 June 1948
Location	Coast of Israel
Result	IDF victory: Civil war averted after Irgun leader Menachem Begin orders his followers not to retaliate; Most arrested Irgun members later released and integrated into IDF

Belligerents
Israel Defense Forces	Irgun

Commanders and leaders
David Ben-Gurion; Yigael Yadin	Menachem Begin; Monroe Fein

Strength
unknown	800–900

Casualties and losses
3 killed	16 killed 200+ arrested

The Altalena Affair was a violent confrontation that took place in June 1948 between the newly created Israel Defense Forces and the Irgun (also known as Etzel), one of the Jewish paramilitary groups that were in the process of merging to form the IDF. The confrontation involved a cargo ship, the Altalena, captained by ex-US Navy lieutenant Monroe Fein and led by senior Etzel commander Eliyahu Lankin, which had been loaded with weapons and fighters by the independent Irgun, but arrived during the murky period of the Irgun's absorption into the IDF. Nineteen Israelis (three IDF soldiers and sixteen Irgun members) were killed in the confrontation. The incident brought the newfound Israel to the brink of civil war.

== History ==
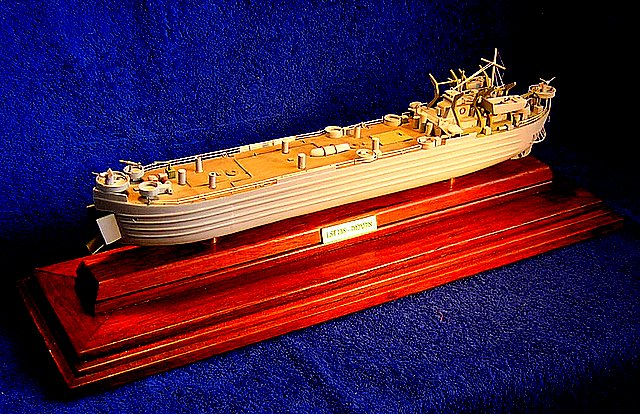
Model of the Altalena

As the British Mandate for Palestine was coming to an end, and following the United Nations General Assembly vote recommending the Partition Plan for Mandatory Palestine, which took place on 29 November 1947, Jewish leaders proclaimed the establishment of the State of Israel on May 14, 1948. The declaration of independence was followed by the establishment of a provisional government and the Israel Defense Forces (IDF). The process of absorbing all military organizations into the IDF proved complicated, and several paramilitary groups continued to be active outside the IDF. One of the largest groups, the Irgun, planned to ship weapons and fighters to the newly formed state. The plans included a ship renamed Altalena (a nom de plume of Zionist leader Ze'ev Jabotinsky) and a target date for the ship's arrival from Europe was set to mid-May 1948. The Altalena, former landing ship tank USS LST-138, organized by Hillel Kook (a.k.a., Peter Bergson) purchased by Irgun members Gershon Hakim, Abraham Stavsky, and Victor Ben-Nachum, was originally intended to reach Israel on 15 May 1948, loaded with fighters and military equipment.

Weapons valued at 153 million francs were donated by the French government, in accordance with a secret agreement approved by French Foreign Minister Georges Bidault. The exact text of the agreement has not been found, and the French motivation is unclear. However, it is known that Bidault was very concerned about the possibility of a Jordanian takeover of Jerusalem. Deputy Chief of Staff General Henri Coudraux, who was involved in the operation, told a 1949 inquiry that France had "reached a secret agreement with the Irgun, which promised it advantages if it were to come into power [in Israel]." He described the Irgun's representative in the negotiations, Shmuel Ariel, as "a terrorist who did not represent a legitimate organization and acted to take power by force."

According to Begin biographer Daniel Gordis, organizational matters took longer than expected, and the sailing was postponed for several weeks. Meanwhile, on 1 June, an agreement had been signed for the absorption of the Irgun into the IDF and one of the clauses stated that the Irgun had to cease all independent arms acquisition activities. Consequently, the Irgun informed the Israeli government about the Altalena.

The Irgun headquarters in Paris did their best to keep the Altalena's preparations for departure a secret, but it was difficult to conceal the movement of 940 men and the loading of a large quantity of arms and ammunition. It was feared that if the plans were discovered, attempts might be made to sabotage the Altalena at sea.

For this reason, when it raised anchor on 11 June, no cable was sent to the Irgun command in Israel, for fear that it would fall into the wrong hands. These precautionary measures proved fruitless, however, and the following day the BBC reported that the Altalena had sailed from Port-de-Bouc, France, in the direction of Israel with 940 Jewish volunteers and a large quantity of weapons on board.

The first truce in the 1948 Arab–Israeli War had also begun on 11 June and when the Irgun leaders in Israel learned through the BBC broadcast of the embarkation of the vessel, they feared that this breach of the truce conditions (i.e., the ban on bringing military equipment and fighters into the country) would be discovered (though ultimately, these aspects of the truce were ignored by both sides). Menachem Begin decided therefore to postpone the arrival of the ship, and Irgun staff secretary Zippora Levi-Kessel sent a wireless message to the Altalena to stay put and await orders. A similar cable was sent to Shmuel Katz (member of the General Headquarters), who was then in Paris, but the ship had already departed the day before the message arrived.

On 15 June, Begin and his comrades held a meeting with government representatives, at which Begin announced that the ship had sailed without his knowledge and that he wanted to hold consultations on how to proceed. In his diary for 16 June, David Ben-Gurion, the head of the provisional government, wrote:

Yisrael [Galili] and Skolnik [Levi Eshkol] met yesterday with Begin. Tomorrow or the next day their ship is due to arrive: 4,500 tons, bringing 800–900 men, 5,000 rifles, 250 Bren guns, 5 million bullets, 50 bazookas, 10 Bren carriers. Zipstein (director of Tel Aviv port) assumes that at night it will be possible to unload it all. I believe we should not endanger Tel Aviv port. They should not be sent back. They should be disembarked at an unknown shore.

Galili informed Begin of Ben-Gurion's consent to the landing of the ship, adding a request that it be done as quickly as possible. Zippora Levi-Kessel then radioed the vessel to come in at full speed. The following day, a working meeting was held between Irgun representatives and Defense Ministry personnel. While the Irgun proposed directing the Altalena to Tel Aviv beach, Defense Ministry representatives claimed that Kfar Vitkin beach was preferable, as it would be easier to evade UN observers there. The ship was therefore instructed to make for Kfar Vitkin.

== Confrontation with the IDF ==
Intense negotiations between representatives of the provisional government (headed by Ben-Gurion) and the Irgun (headed by Begin) followed the departure of the Altalena from France. Among the issues discussed were logistics of its landing and distribution of the cargo. Whilst there was agreement on the anchoring place of the Altalena, there were differences of opinion about the cargo. Ben-Gurion agreed to Begin's initial request that 20 percent of the weapons be dispatched to the Irgun's Jerusalem Battalion, which was still fighting independently. His second request that the remainder be transferred to the IDF to equip the newly incorporated Irgun battalions was rejected by the government representatives, who interpreted the request as a demand to reinforce an "army within an army".

The Altalena reached Kfar Vitkin in the late afternoon of Sunday, 20 June, greeted by Menachem Begin and a group of Irgun members on shore. Irgun sympathizers from the nearby town of Netanya and residents of the fishing village of Mikhmoret gathered on the beach to help unload the cargo. After the ship dropped anchor, 940 passengers disembarked and were taken to an army camp for induction into the IDF. Arms were unloaded throughout the night. In all, 2,000 rifles, two million rounds of ammunition, 3,000 shells, and 200 Bren guns were unloaded at Kfar Vitkin. Concomitantly with the events at Kfar Vitkin, the government had convened in Tel Aviv for its weekly meeting. Ben-Gurion reported on the meetings which had preceded the arrival of the Altalena and was adamant that Begin hand over the weapons:

We must decide whether to hand over power to Begin or to order him to cease his separate activities. If he does not do so, we will open fire! Otherwise, we must decide to disperse our own army.

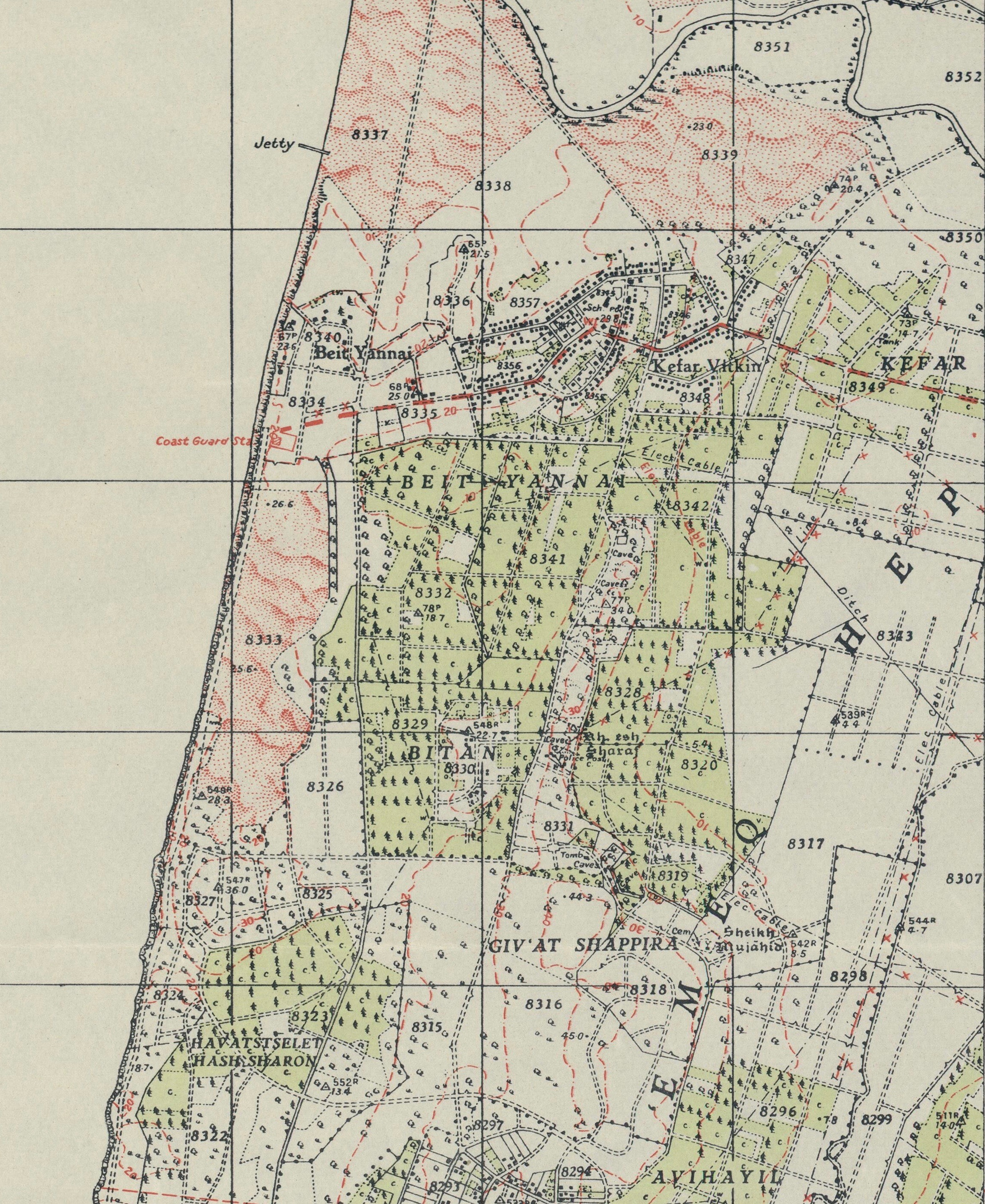
Kfar Vitkin 1949 1:20,000, jetty where Altalena unloaded marked

The debate ended in a resolution to empower the army to use force if necessary. Implementation was assigned to the Alexandroni Brigade commanded by Dan Even (Epstein), which the following day surrounded the Kfar Vitkin area in two regiments equipped with armor and artillery. In addition, the Israeli Navy deployed three corvettes off Kfar Vitkin. Even issued the following ultimatum:

To: M. Begin
By special order from the Chief of the General Staff of the Israel Defense Forces, I am empowered to confiscate the weapons and military materials which have arrived on the Israeli coast in the area of my jurisdiction in the name of the Israel Government. I have been authorized to demand that you hand over the weapons to me for safekeeping and to inform you that you should establish contact with the supreme command. You are required to carry out this order immediately. If you do not agree to carry out this order, I shall use all the means at my disposal in order to implement the order and to requisition the weapons which have reached shore and transfer them from private possession into the possession of the Israel government. I wish to inform you that the entire area is surrounded by fully armed military units and armored cars, and all roads are blocked. I hold you fully responsible for any consequences in the event of your refusal to carry out this order. The immigrants—unarmed—will be permitted to travel to the camps in accordance with your arrangements. You have ten minutes to give me your answer.
D.E., Brigade Commander

The ultimatum was made, according to Even, "in order not to give the Irgun commander time for lengthy considerations and to gain the advantage of surprise." Begin did not respond. Claiming he needed more time, he drove to Netanya to consult directly with government leaders. A standoff between the IDF and Irgun members at the beach ensued as a UN observation plane circled overhead and recorded the incident. Failing to reach an accord, Begin returned to the beach and conferred with his officers. As evening began, rifle fire broke out; which side fired first is a matter of dispute. Hillel Kook, an eyewitness, claimed it was the Irgun, which fired shots toward the sea to demonstrate their will to resist. As the fighting began, Begin fled to the Altalena in a rowboat, under fire from the corvettes offshore, and Captain Fein maneuvered the Altalena to shield Begin, enabling him to board safely. On shore, the Irgun fighters were compelled to surrender. The IDF suffered two dead and six wounded, while the Irgun suffered six dead and eighteen wounded. In order to prevent further bloodshed, the residents of Kfar Vitkin initiated negotiations between Yaakov Meridor (Begin's deputy) and Dan Even which ended in a general ceasefire and the transfer of the weapons on shore to the local IDF commander.

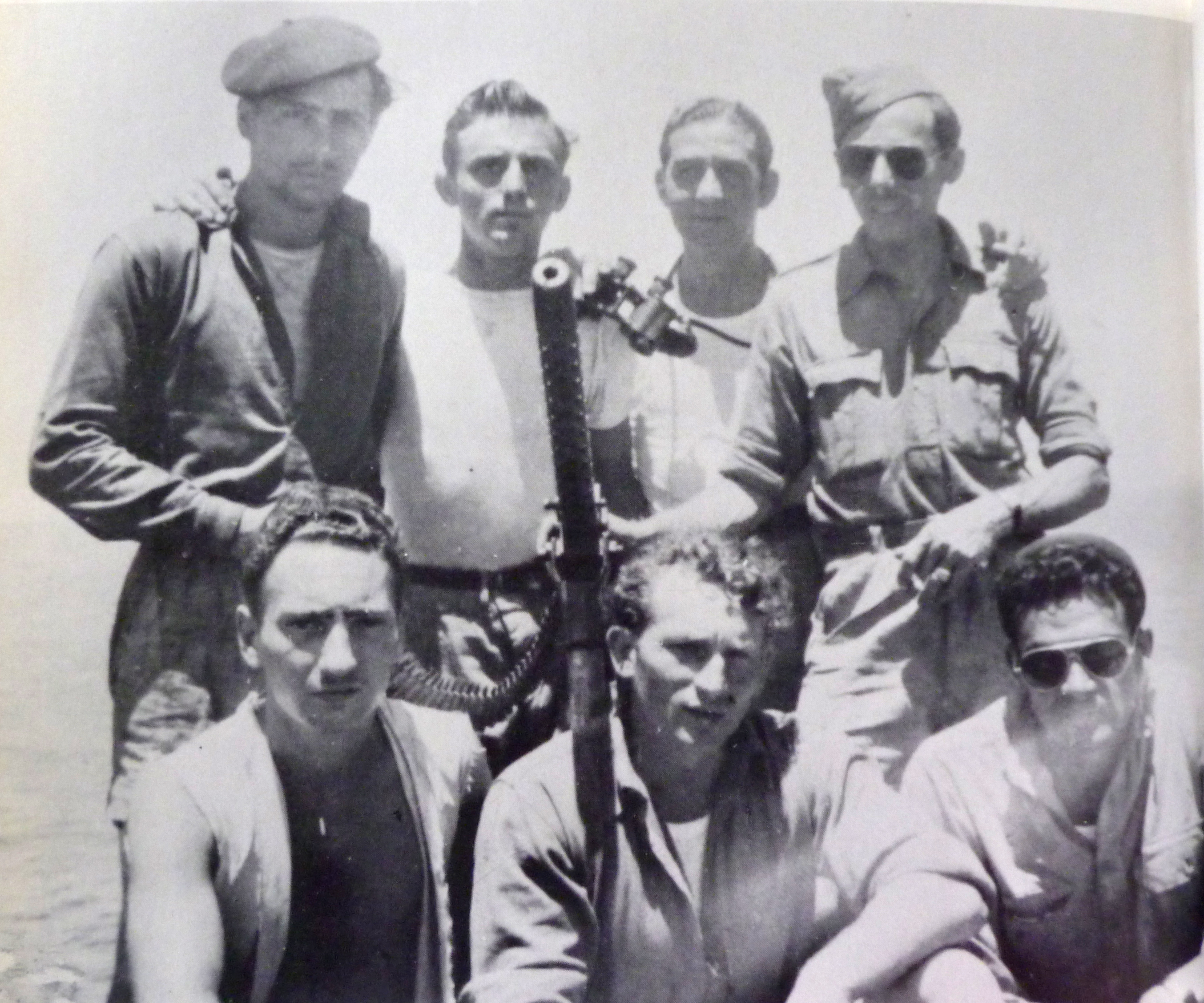
Some of the crew of the Altalena, including Captain Monroe Fein (bottom row center).

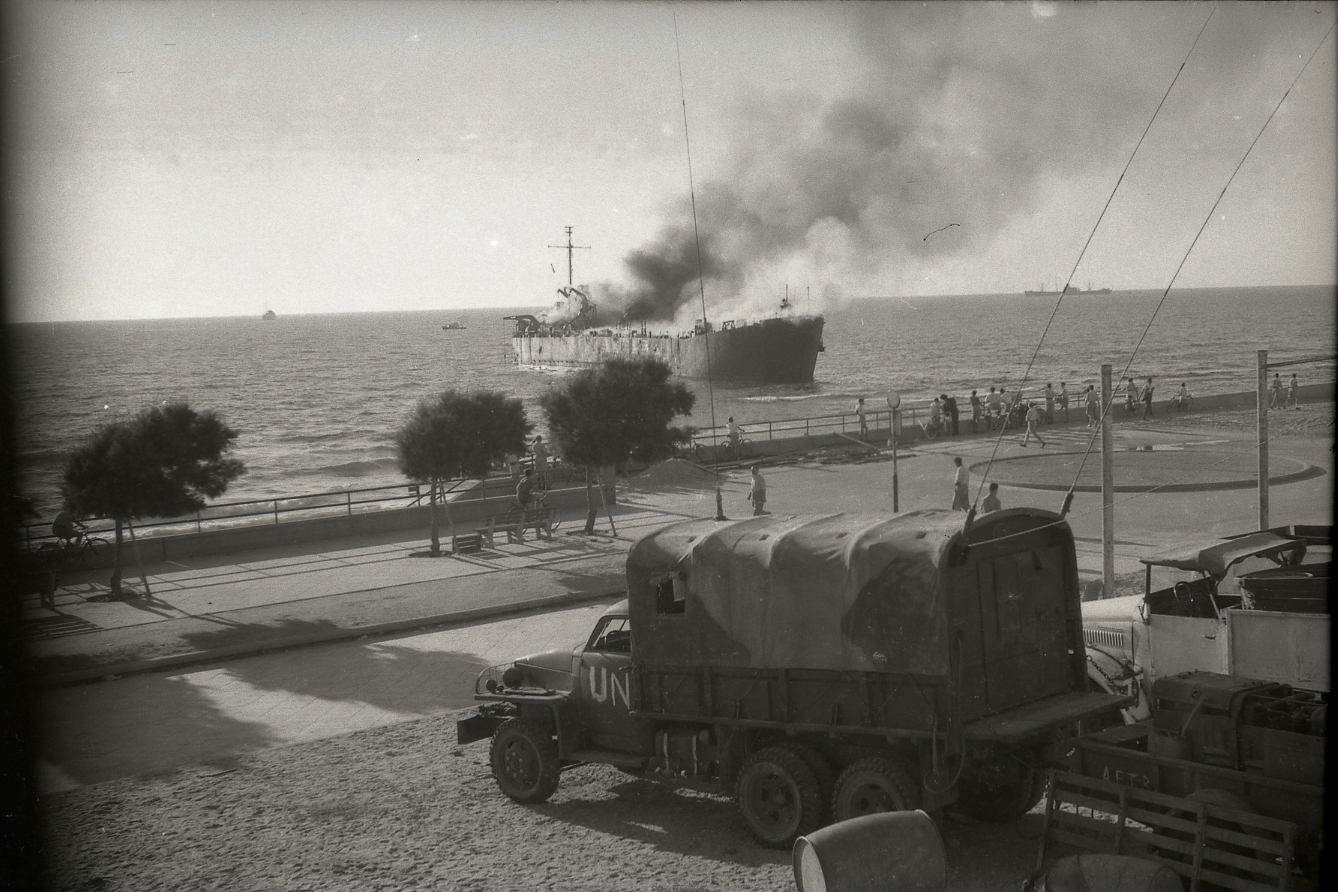
Altalena burning near the shore

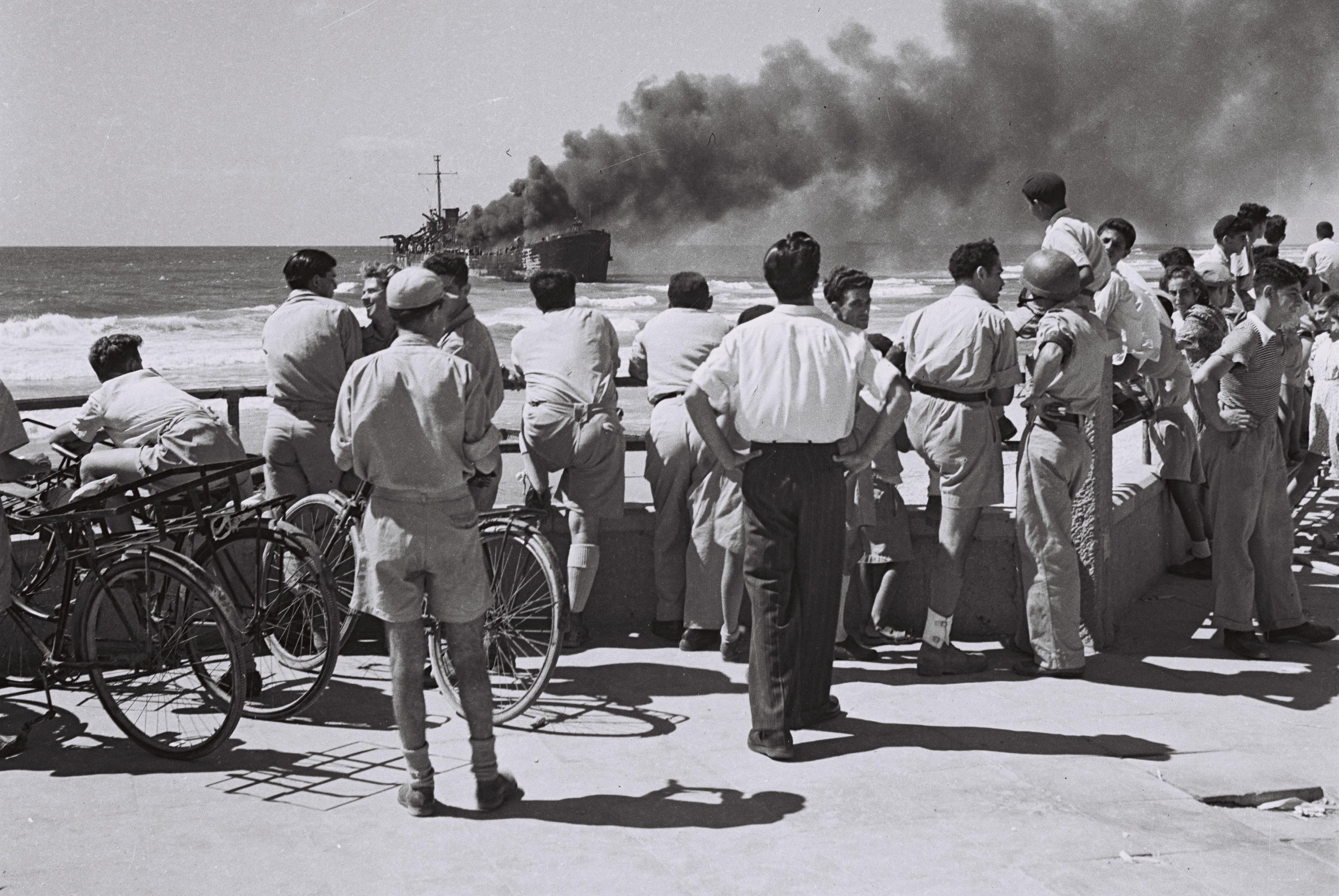
People looking at burning ship

Meanwhile, Begin ordered the Altalena to sail to Tel Aviv, where there were more Irgun supporters. At 9:35 p.m., the Altalena began cruising toward Tel Aviv. Many Irgun members, who had joined the IDF earlier that month, left their bases and assembled on the beach. Rumors began circulating that the Irgun was planning a military coup.

According to the book Altalena by journalist and political analyst Shlomo Nakdimon, Ben-Gurion instructed the Israeli Air Force to sink the ship on the high seas, long before it approached the shore. This would have resulted in much greater loss of life aboard. Gordon Levett, a Mahal volunteer pilot, wrote in his book Flying Under Two Flags that Heiman Shamir, deputy commander of the Air Force, tried to convince non-Jewish pilot volunteers to attack the ship. However, three pilots refused to participate in the mission, one of them saying, "You can kiss my foot. I did not lose four friends and fly 10,000 miles in order to bomb Jews."

The Altalena was shadowed by navy corvettes on its way to Tel Aviv. As the ship neared the coastline, the corvettes began firing at it with bursts of machine gun fire, and stopped after fighters on board the Altalena returned fire with Bren guns mounted on deck. The Altalena arrived at midnight, running aground on the busiest stretch of shore, at the foot of David Frischmann Street, in view of locals, journalists, and UN observers watching from the terrace of the Kaete Dan Hotel (today Dan Tel Aviv). In response, Ben-Gurion ordered Yigael Yadin (acting chief of staff) to concentrate large forces on the Tel Aviv beach and to take the ship by force. He also indicated to his interior minister that he would order the Israeli Navy to intercept any attempt by the Altalena to retreat into international waters. The IDF transferred heavy guns to the area and at 4 p.m. the next day, Ben-Gurion ordered the shelling of the Altalena. The first gunner ordered to shell the ship, a Red Army veteran named Yosef Aksen, refused, saying he was willing to be executed for insubordination and this would be "the best thing he did in his life." At this, his superior, Nathan Plotnik, ordered him to be imprisoned to await a court-martial for insubordination.

Then Hillel Daleski, a recent immigrant from South Africa, initially protested, telling Shmuel Admon, the commander of the IDF Artillery Corps, that "I didn't come to the Land of Israel to fight against Jews." However, his superior yelled at him that it was his duty to obey orders. Threatened with a court-martial if he did not fire, Daleski reluctantly complied. One of the shells hit the ship, and it began to burn.

Yitzhak Rabin commanded the IDF and Palmach forces on the shore. Yigal Allon later claimed that five or six shells were fired as warning shots, and hit the ship by accident. IDF troops on the shore also directed heavy small-arms fire towards the ship, and employed heavy machine guns with armor-piercing rounds. Some soldiers refused to open fire on the Altalena, including a Palmach soldier whose brother, an Irgun officer, was on board. Menachem Begin, hoping to avert civil war, ordered his men not to shoot back, and the ship raised the white flag. However, the firing continued, and some Irgun members on board reportedly returned fire. The Israeli corvettes also fired at the Altalena during the battle, and one crew member later claimed that IDF troops on the beach were hit by fire from one of the corvettes, which had aimed at the Altalena but overshot its target. On the beach, a battle between the IDF and Irgun forces along the shore erupted, and clashes between IDF and Irgun units also took place throughout Tel Aviv, mainly in the south and center.

Fearing the fire would spread to the holds which contained explosives, Captain Fein ordered all aboard to abandon ship. Passengers jumped into the water, whilst their comrades on shore set out to meet them on rafts. Begin biographer Daniel Gordis writes that although Captain Fein flew the white flag of surrender, automatic fire continued to be directed at the unarmed survivors swimming in the water. Begin, who was on deck, agreed to leave the ship only after the last of the wounded had been evacuated. Although civil war appeared imminent, a cease-fire was arranged by the evening of 22 June. Mass arrests were carried out against Irgun soldiers who had joined their former comrades, and Irgun units in the IDF were disbanded, with their soldiers dispersed among other units. In all, more than 200 Irgun members were arrested. Most were released several weeks later, with the exception of five senior commanders (Moshe Hason, Eliyahu Lankin, Yaakov Meridor, Bezalel Amitzur, and Hillel Kook), who were detained for more than two months, until 27 August 1948. Eight IDF soldiers who refused to fire on the Altalena were court-martialed for insubordination.

Meanwhile, Begin reached his clandestine radio station and ordered his men not to fight back. He called for them to assemble in Jerusalem and continue the battle for the Old City.

Sixteen Irgun fighters were killed in the confrontation with the army (all but three were veteran members and not newcomers from the ship); six were killed in the Kfar Vitkin area and ten on Tel Aviv beach. Three IDF soldiers were killed: two at Kfar Vitkin and one in Tel Aviv.

== Aftermath ==
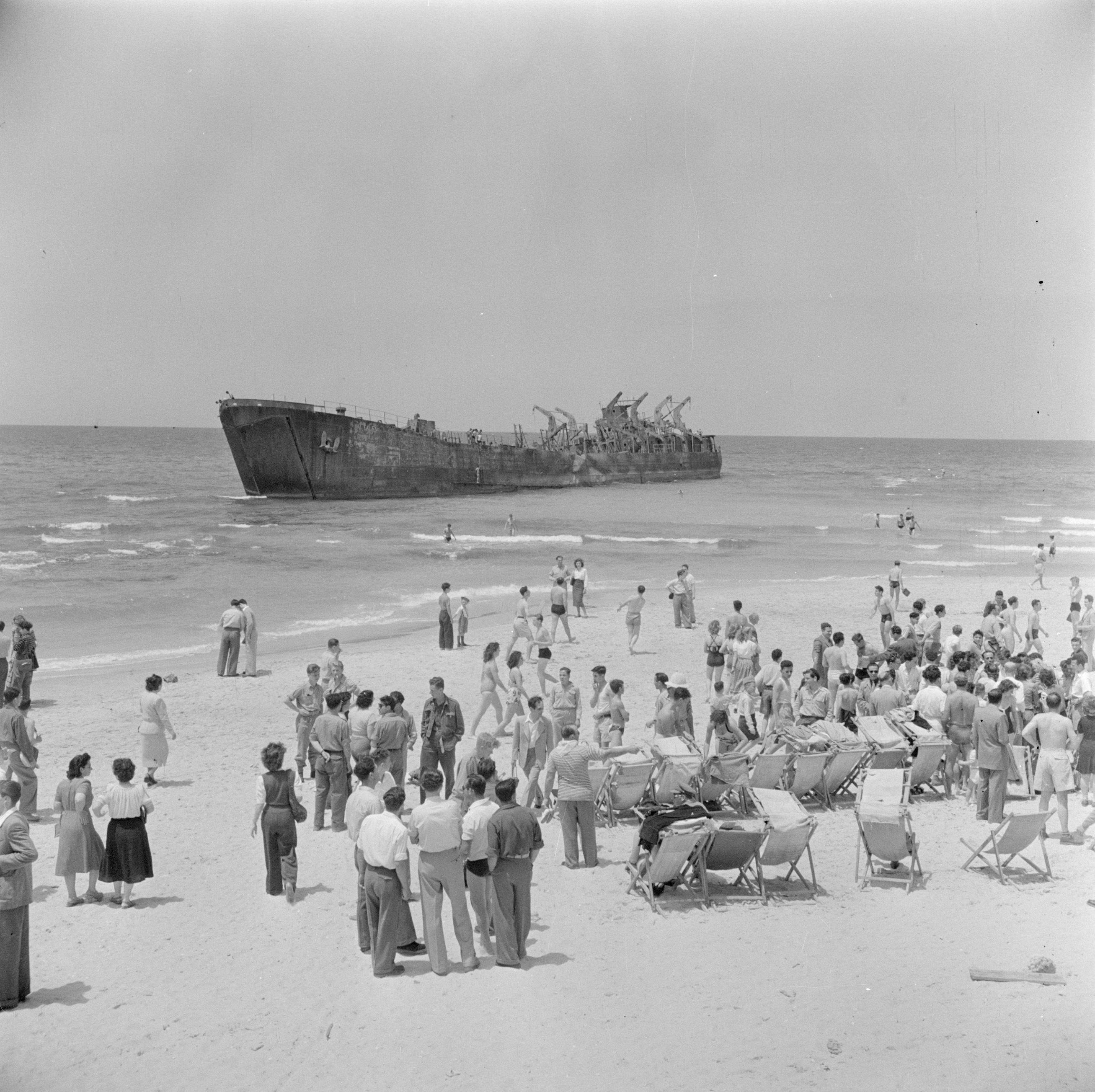
Burned Altalena near the beach, 1948

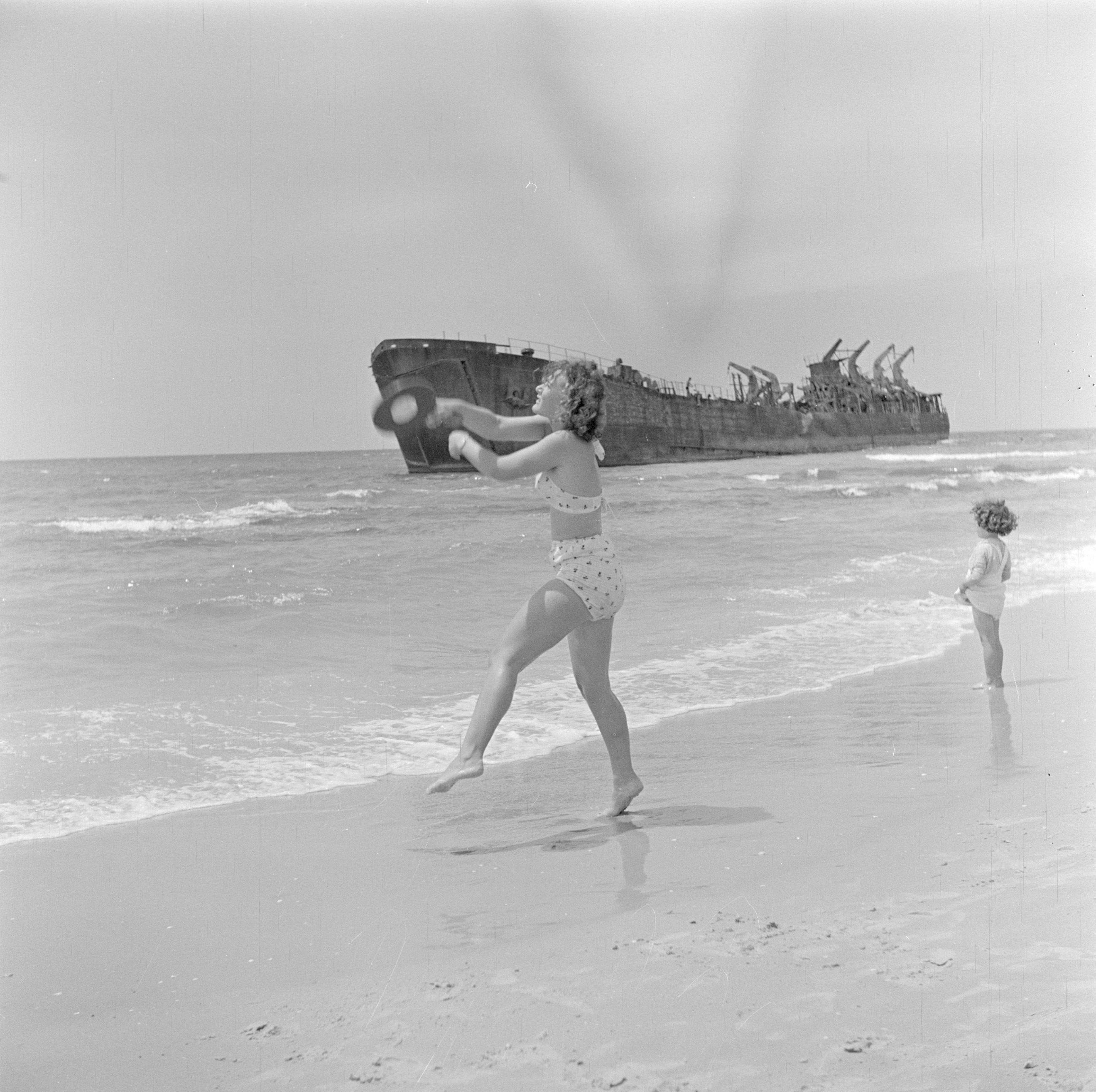
People on the beach, burned Altalena in the background, 1948

About a year after the incident, the Altalena was refloated, towed 15 miles out to sea, and sunk.

The Altalena Affair exposed deep rifts between the main political factions in Israel, and is still occasionally referenced in Israeli media to illustrate the current debate as to whether or not the use of force by the Israeli government against fringe Jewish political elements is legitimate. Proponents of Ben-Gurion's actions praised them as essential to establishing the government's authority and discouraging factionalism and formation of rival armies. This was consistent with other actions he took, such as dissolving the Palmach later that year. Furthermore, Ben-Gurion's supporters have argued that a state must have a monopoly over the use of force. The Irgun, by attempting to import weapons to use as a private militia, was undermining the legitimacy of the fledgling State of Israel.

Opponents condemned what they saw as unnecessary violence. The debate was reignited for a short time when Likud headed by Menachem Begin won the 1977 elections.

Begin later said, "My greatest accomplishment was not retaliating and causing civil war." Years later, on the eve of the Six-Day War, in June 1967 (when Levi Eshkol was prime minister), Menachem Begin joined a delegation which visited Sde Boker to ask David Ben-Gurion to return and accept the premiership again. After that meeting, Ben-Gurion said that if he had then known Begin as he did now, the face of history would have been different.

In 2012, the wreckage of the Altalena was discovered by marine experts hired by the Menachem Begin Heritage Center in a search effort that the Israeli government helped to fund. The search was initially based on Israeli Navy's coordinates on the location where it was sunk, but after failing to turn up results, the search area was expanded. The Altalena was eventually found sitting on the seabed several kilometers off the coast of Rishon LeZion at a depth of about 300 metres (1,000 ft). A sonar survey confirmed the ship's identity. The Israeli government subsequently announced plans to raise the wreck and install it on dry land as a monument. On 24 August, 2026, National Security Minister Itamar Ben-Gvir and Heritage Minister Amichai Eliyahu announced in a joint statement confirming the ship wreckage's identification as the Altalena.

== Legacy ==
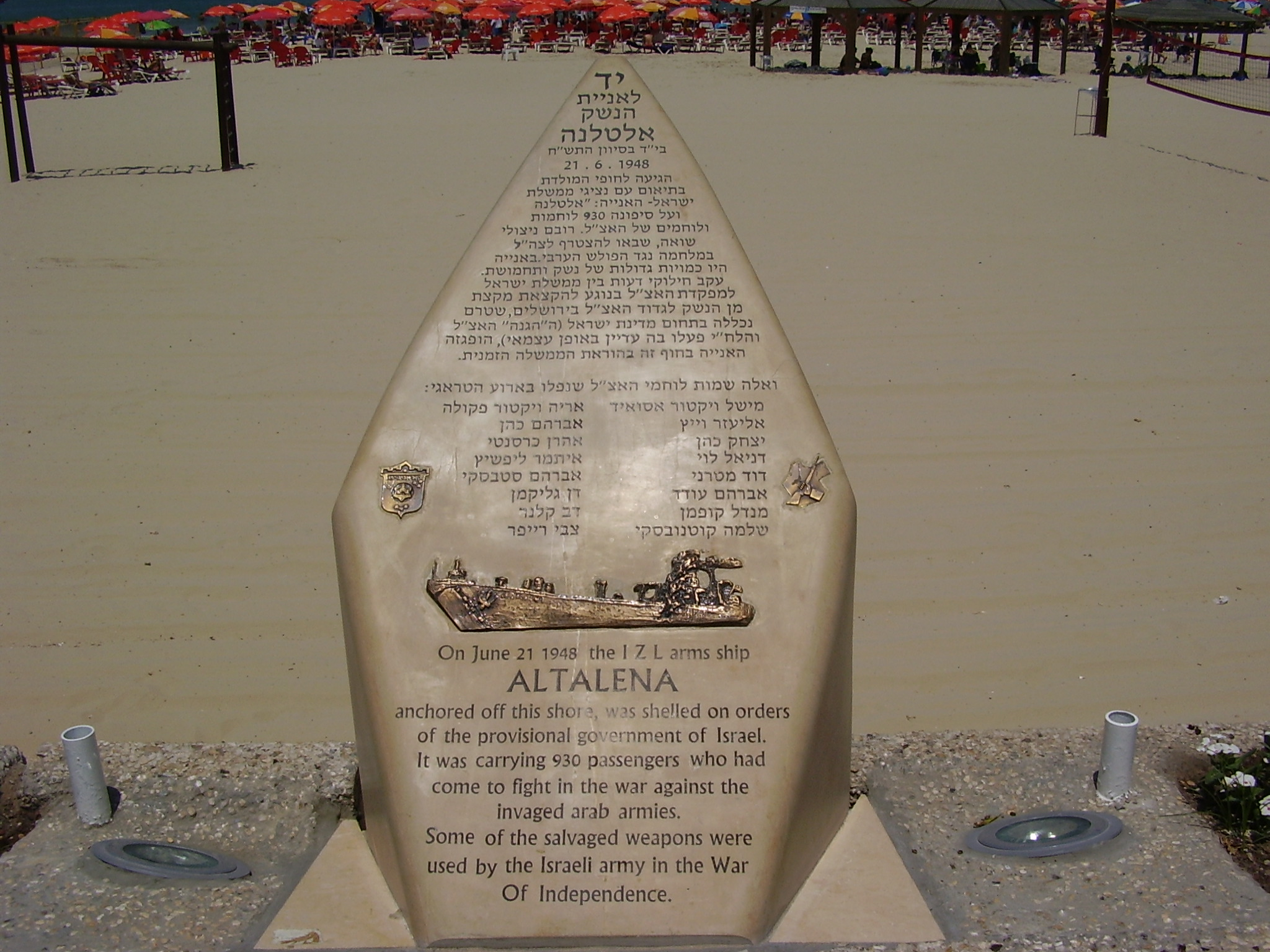
Altalena memorial on Tel-Aviv Beach

The first memorial to the sixteen Irgun fighters and three IDF soldiers killed in the Altalena sinking was erected in the Nahalat Yitzhak Cemetery in Givatayim in 1998. The official government memorial ceremony for the victims is held annually on the cemetery grounds. The ceremony is primarily attended by relatives of the victims and political personalities identified with Israel's national camp.

In 2011, invitations circulated by Israel's Ministry of Defense used the word murdered in reference to the fighters who lost their lives in the incident, implying that Ben-Gurion, Rabin, and the IDF had committed murder. Defense Minister Ehud Barak subsequently demanded that the "severe mishap" be investigated and corrected. Speaker of the Knesset at the time and subsequently president of Israel Reuven Rivlin said at the ceremony that the Altalena Affair was an unatonable crime.

Every year, a cruise led by the Hazon Leumi organization leaves from the port of Jaffa to the place where the ship sank, where a memorial ceremony is held in memory of those who died on the ship.

== See also ==
- List of Jewish civil wars
- The Saison

== Bibliography ==
- "House Divided". Time. 5 July 1948. p. 28.
- Ben-Gurion speech in Knesset, 23 June 1948 after the affair, beginning, continuation. English translation in The Jewish Criterion of 13 August 1948.
- Begin, Menachem (1978): The Revolt, Dell Publishing, ISBN 978-0-440-17598-8 (also available in a 2002 edition translated by Shmuel Katz, ASIN B000TAQ4Y2 ).
- The Altalena Affair Etzel
- The Altalena Affair Palmach
- Joseph Heller (2000). The birth of Israel, 1945–1949: Ben-Gurion and his critics. University Press of Florida. p. 379. ISBN 978-0-8130-1732-7.
- Kurzman, Dan (1983). Ben-Gurion, prophet of fire. Simon and Schuster. p. 293 (544). ISBN 978-0-671-23094-4.
- Temko, Ned (1987). To win or to die: a personal portrait of Menachem Begin. W. Morrow. p. 373 (460). ISBN 978-0-688-04338-4.
- Roger Friedland, Richard Hecht (2000). To rule Jerusalem. University of California Press. pp. 159–160 (604). ISBN 978-0-520-22092-8.
- Joseph Heller (1995). The Stern Gang: ideology, politics, and terror, 1940-1949. Routledge. pp. 225–229 (358). ISBN 978-0-7146-4558-2.
- J. Bowyer Bell, Moshe Arens (1996). Terror out of Zion. New Brunswick, N.J.: Transaction Publishers. pp. 310, 311, 318–327, 329, 330, 343, 347, 349. ISBN 978-1-56000-870-5.
- שלמה נקדימון, אלטלנה, הוצאת עידנים, 1978. (Hebrew)
- אורי ברנר, אלטלנה — מחקר מדיני וצבאי Published by מכון טבנקין לחקר ולימוד, 1978, תשל"ח. (Uri Brener, "Altalena – state and military inquiry", 1978 (under Begin government), in Hebrew)
- יעקב מרקוביצקי, לקסיקון אצ"ל, משרד הבטחון, 2005. (Hebrew)
- Gordon Levett (1993). Flying Under Two Flags: Ex-RAF Pilot in Israel's War of Independence. Frank Cass Publishers. p. 312. ISBN 978-0-7146-4102-7.
