= Uri Tzafon =

Israeli far-right expansionist Grassroots Movement

Awake, O North
- Uri Tzafon עורי צפון
- The logo of the movement
- Named after: Song of Songs, Chapter 4, verse 16
- Formation: March 2024; 2 years ago
- Founder: Anna Slutskin; Yaakov Socol; Dr. Amos Azaria
- Legal status: Grassroots Movement
- Region served: Israel, Blue Line, Lebanon
- Official language: Hebrew
- Award: Certificate of appreciation for Pioneers of Settlements
- Website: uritsafon.com

Uri Tzafon (English: "Awake, O North") is a far-right grassroots movement based in Israel that promotes a permanent revision of the northern border of Israel with neighbouring Lebanon. The movement started in 2024 as a niche initiative promoting the annexation of the territories south of the Litani River, before growing significantly in popularity following the 2026 Iran War and the 2026 Lebanon War. Whilst the main goal remains to settle the territories of the Litani River and "Judaize them", the movement's expansionist goals have recently also started to include all the territories south of the Zahrani River. As of 2026, the movement has become mainstream; however, it continues to face backlash by some analysts and members have been arrested over the years due to illegal crossings into Lebanon.

== Name ==
The movement was named after the Song of Songs , Chapter 4, verse 16. The movement's unofficial but heavily repeated motto is "occupation, expulsion, settlement".

== History ==
=== Founding ===
The movement was founded in memory of Yisrael Socol, a 24-year-old Israeli soldier who died in January 2024 during the Gaza War. Yisrael was a strong advocate for settling the Gaza Strip following the war and also a supporter of settling Lebanon, where he dreamed of becoming a settler. Amos Azaria, a professor who also had similar ambitions, attended his shiva where he met his parents and proposed the creation of Uri Tzafon to them to "realize Yisrael’s dream", which the Socol family accepted.

=== Activities ===
In just one month, the WhatsApp forum of the movement managed to gain up to 3,000 members. In this forum, people would discuss future kayaking trips in southern Lebanon, Hebrew names for Lebanese cities, and critiques against the government's policies in Lebanon and Northern Israel, which were often described as "docile".

The movement soon expanded past digital spaces and started to organize events and leafletings in real life, specifically in Northern Israel. Playgrounds and bunkers were covered in posters promoting their cause, and protests started to be organized.

In December 2024, during the 2024 Lebanon War, the group claimed to have entered IDF-controlled Lebanese territory and to have created a settlement, with a remembrance post in memory of Yehudah Dror Yahalom, a soldier who died in the West Bank. Israeli authorities denied this and stated that the group merely settled in a military zone within Israel itself, and not in Lebanon. However, in a separate report, they confirmed that the group had indeed attempted to settle within Lebanon and had crossed the Blue Line near Maroun al-Ras. The group was later evacuated from the area by the IDF.

On February 12, 2026 members of the movement arrived in the kibbutz of Yir'on crossed the fence into Lebanese territory and planted cedars. Following this the Israeli, Police detained two members for questioning.

On April 22, 2026, on the occasion of Independence Day and as a protest against the 2026 Israel–Lebanon ceasefire, the movement organised a family tour along the Lebanese border, sponsoring the establishment of a Jewish settlement in southern Lebanon. During the tour some of the members of the movement crossed the adjacent fence into Lebanon and were later arrested by the Israeli Defense Forces.

== Ideology ==
Map showcasing the scope and "minimalistic" goals of the movement. Additionally, the image showcases renamed Southern Lebanese towns.

The movement adheres to Religious Zionism. It is often described as a far-right movement within Israel.

Whilst generally public discourse focuses on the annexation of the land south of the Litani River, as of 2026, the group's public rhetoric has expanded, claiming support to annex territories up to the Zaharani River. Some members with maximalist ideas adhere to the zionist ideology of Greater Israel spanning from the Nile and to the Euphrates River. The movement published maps showcasing proposed "Judaized" names for Southern Lebanese towns, with names often inspired by Biblical ones.

== Structure ==
The movement has three main co-founders, Anna Slutskin, an Israeli biologist, and Yaakov Socol, both siblings of the deceased Yisrael Socol, the inspiration for the movement and university professor Dr. Amos Azaria.

== Support ==
=== Political support ===
Back in 2024 it was reported that the movement did not have the support of neither Benjamin Nethanyahu, Bezalel Smotrich nor Itamar Ben-Gvir despite their support of settlements in the West Bank and the Gaza Strip. However, the movement had gained the support of influential rabbi and author Yitzchak Ginsburgh.

For a significant period the only member of the Knesset who voiced a desire to settle Southern Lebanon and support for those willing (during the movement's existence), such as the movement, was Avigdor Lieberman, leader of the Yisrael Beitenu party, however, in 2026, this changed. Religious Zionist MK Ohad Tal, MK Yitzhak Kroizer, MK Bezalel Smotrich joined the movement's call for settling Southern Lebanon. Knesset member Ariel Kallner joined a tour organised by the movement on the Lebanese border. In May 2026 Itamar Ben-Gvir also expressed his support in settling Southern Lebanon and legalizing initiatives that promote it.

=== Popular support ===
Initially the movement was treated as a fringe or niche movement, especially in the years prior to the 2026 Lebanon War. However, following its outbreak public opinion started to support the movement's motives, with Haaretz stating that the initiative was now "broad and [a] troubling consensus". Support started to become prominent especially amongst rabbis, families of fallen soldiers, opinionists and the general public. This has led to the movement becoming mainstream.

== Awards ==
On January 19, 2026, the movement was given an official certificate of appreciation alongside the Pioneers of Bashan by Limor Son Har-Melech and Itamar Ben-Gvir at a conference on the topic of "pioneers of settlements" and was subsequently defined as "heroes".

== Works ==
In 2024 the movement released a propaganda children's book encouraging settlements in Southern Lebanon where a boy lives in a Jewish settlement in the near future.
