= Pioneers of Bashan =

Israeli settlers' movement

- חלוצי הבשן
- Logo of the Pioneers of Bashan
- Formation: April 2025; 1 year ago
- Founder: Amos Azaria
- Legal status: Settler movement
- Official language: Hebrew
- Award: Certificate of Appreciation for Pioneers of Settlements

The Pioneers of Bashan is a far-right settler movement advocating for the Israeli settlement and displacement of Syrians of the Mount Hermon region, the Bashan region which it defines as the Quneitra, Daraa and Sweida Governorates of Syria, and portions of eastern Jordan, as well as the annexation of said territories into the State of Israel. The group's leader, Amos Azaria, stated that the goal of the Pioneers of Bashan is the "depopulation" of the Sunni inhabitants Syria's southwest, and to establish a "humanitarian corridor" to the Druze in Sweida stating “The entire Daraa district ... must be cleared... and instead be filled with Jewish settlement." The movement was founded in April 2025, and since then, it has faced both internal support and backlash, with instances of arrests.

== Name ==
The name comes from the historic region of "Bashan", a fertile region mentioned in the Torah and that stretches between Southern Syria and Eastern Jordan. The name is important as it parallel's the movement's exact ambitions in neighbouring countries.

== History ==
=== Foundation ===
The movement was founded in April 2025 after the fall of the Assad regime, the Israeli invasion of Syria, and Benjamin Netanyahu's statement on the collapse of the 1974 disengagement agreement.

=== Activities ===
On July 27, 2025, the movement organized a tour to Mount Zion, where teenagers and families marched while calling for the opening of a touristic and ski site there. Activists crossed the Israel-Syria-Lebanon border triangle during their tour.

On August 18, 2025, the movement held a cornerstone-laying ceremony beyond the UNDOF zone for a settlement they called "Neve HaBashan". Activists claimed the gates had been open for them to enter. Some participants planted an Israeli flag, and the family of soldier Yehuda Dror Yahalom placed a memorial sign there. Some participants were taken in for police questioning following the incursion.

On October 15, 2025, the movement conducted a large tour along the UNDOF zone, including Tal Saki, Ein Ayah natural spring, and the Bashanit Ridge. During the tour, three families attempted to cross the fence with tents and equipment in order to settle beyond the UNDOF zone, but the Israeli Defense Forces prevented them from entering. The movement stated that the action was intended to protest government policy regarding the northern border and to demand the establishment of Jewish settlements in the area. The IDF escorted the families back into Israeli territory.

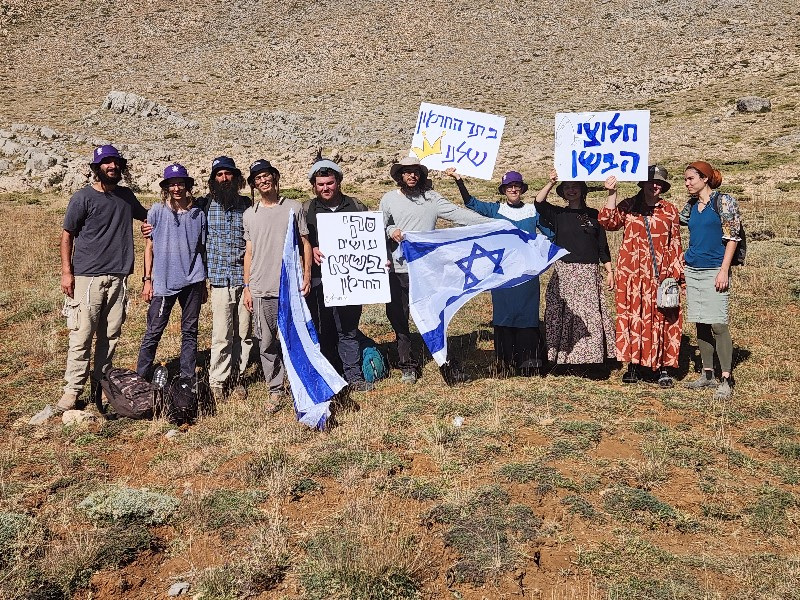
Members of the movement in an expedition on Mount Zion

On November 27, 2025, a launch conference was held in Jerusalem calling for a return to the Golan region. Participants included Moshe Feiglin, Baruch Marzel, and other public figures. At the same time as the conference, several people identified with the movement entered Syrian territory at two different points in an attempt to establish a settlement outpost, but were intercepted and kicked by the IDF.

On December 22, 2025, a group of teenagers from the movement managed to cross into the UNDOF zone and speak with locals in the village of Beer Ajam. They remained in the area for more than two hours until IDF forces arrived and expelled them back to Israel. The same group had also attempted to cross into the UNDOF zone the previous day but had been stopped by Israeli Police.

On January 29, 2026, around 10 families from the movement's settlement core arrived at a military post near the entrance to Quneitra to establish a settlement point in the area. According to reports, security forces blocked their advance, and around 15 participants were handed over to the Israeli Police. A group of girls briefly crossed the security fence and returned to the Golan Heights territories at the soldiers' request.

On February 15, 2026, three activists crossed the Golan Heights UNDOF zone at night near the location where the movement had previously attempted to establish "Neve HaBashan". IDF forces evacuated them and transferred them to police custody.

On April 22, 2026, dozens of activists crossed the UNDOF fence near Majdal Shams and entered the area of the Syrian village of Hader. Some barricaded themselves on the roof of a building for several hours and waved Israeli flags. IDF forces transferred them to police custody once again.

In April 2026, the group had members which chanted on the roof of a house at the outskirts of the Syrian village of Hader.

== Support ==
The movement has the support of similar and other movements and organizations, such as Uri Tzafon. Despite the condemnations shown by the IDF in public, there are allegations that state the movement is funded by the government. The group's leader Azaria has stated "We have support from friends in the government and many members of the Knesset."

== Backlash ==
The IDF publicly denounced the "dangers" of the incursions campaigns of the settler movement in Syria, as it poses a risks for civilians and possibly soldiers.

== Awards ==
On January 19, 2026, the movement received a certificate of appreciation at a conference honoring settlement pioneers alongside Uri Tzafon. The conference was organized by MK Limor Son Har-Melech.
