= List of Israelite civil conflicts =

Part of the history of ancient Israel and Judah

The civil conflicts in the ancient Land of Israel listed on this page include two distinct types corresponding to two wider periods. The first are conflicts only mentioned in the Hebrew Bible and/or Samaritan holy books without corroboration from extra-biblical sources, dealing with the time of the judges (ca. 12th-11th centuries BCE, if one accepts the academic view) and the time of the first kings of Israel and Judah (ca. late 11th - late 10th centuries BCE).

The second type are conflicts between Judeans or Jews from the Second Temple period and the Early Roman period up until the end of the Bar Kokhba Revolt (in the time of the Hasmoneans, Herodians, and of direct rule over Judaea through Roman governors). These conflicts are corroborated through contemporary and quasi-contemporary historical sources. They also include conflicts between Jews and the related Samaritans, who inhabited the territories once part of the northern Israelite Kingdom of Israel.

== Hebrew Bible narrative ==
These are conflicts mentioned in the Hebrew Bible and/or Samaritan holy books, but not corroborated by extra-biblical sources.

The Israelites, also known as the Hebrews, engaged in a number of armed conflicts among themselves. Many of these feature in the Hebrew Bible. These conflicts took place during the nomadic period of the Twelve Tribes of Israel and also after them settling in the Land of Israel, both in the time of the judges, and during that of the kings who ruled over ancient Israel and Judah. These were two independent kingdoms—Israel in the north and Judah in the south—in the Southern Levant. The biblical narrative asserts that they were amalgamated during the rule of their first three kings into one united kingdom of Israel and Judah.

- Eli–Pincus conflict – avvording to Samaritan holy books, a civil war broke out between Eli son of Yafni, of the line of Ithamar, and the sons of Pincus (Phinehas), because Eli son of Yafni resolved to usurp the High Priesthood from the descendants of Pincus.
- Benjamite War – Started when a Levite from Ephraim and his concubine, who travel through the Benjamite city of Gibeah and are assailed by a mob, who wish to gang-rape the Levite. He turns his concubine over to the crowd, and they rape her until she collapses. The Levite dismembers her and presents the remains to the other tribes of Israel. Outraged by the incident, the Israelite tribes swear that none shall give his daughter to the Benjamites (or Benjaminites) for marriage, and launch a war which nearly wipes out the clan, leaving only 600 surviving men.
- Abimelech's Tyranny – King Abimelech engaged in war with his own subjects, including the Battle of Shechem.
- Battle of the Wood of Ephraim – Part of a rebel uprising launched by Absalom against the reign of his father David. Absalom had returned from exile in Geshur after assassinating his paternal half-brother Amnon, who had raped Absalom's full sister Tamar. After gathering support in Jerusalem and Hebron, he declared himself king and mobilized his rebels, but was ultimately killed by David's nephew and army commander Joab.
- Jeroboam's Revolt (late 10th century BCE) – Began after the death of David's son and successor Solomon in the Kingdom of Israel and Judah. All of the Twelve Tribes of Israel, except for Judah and Benjamin, rejected Solomon's son and successor Rehoboam in favour of Jeroboam and thereby withdrew their allegiance to the House of David. Led by Jeroboam, these Ten Tribes established the independent Kingdom of Israel (also called the Northern Kingdom) in Samaria, while the loyalists of Judah and Benjamin established the independent Kingdom of Judah (also called the Southern Kingdom) in Judea.

== Second Temple and Roman period ==
- Hasmonean–Samaritan conflict (113–110 BCE) – Beginning in 113 BCE, Hyrcanus began an extensive military campaign against Samaria. Ultimately, Samaria was overrun and totally destroyed. The inhabitants of Samaria were then put into slavery. After these victories, Hyrcanus went north towards Shechem and Mount Gerizim. The city of Shechem was reduced to a village and the Samaritan Temple on Mount Gerizim was destroyed. This military action against Shechem has been dated archaeologically around 111–110 BCE.
- Jewish–Samaritan conflict (1st century AD) – One or more Galilean Jewish pilgrims travelling through Samaria on their way to Jerusalem wrre murdered. Jews under the leadership of two Zealots, Eleazar and Alexander, invaded Samaria and began a massacre. Ventidius Cumanus, the Roman procurator of Iudaea Province, led most of his troops against the militants, killing many and taking others prisoner, and the Jewish leaders from Jerusalem were subsequently able to calm most of the others, but a state of guerrilla warfare persisted.
- Sicarii and Zealot rebels (6–73 CE) – Sicarii were a splinter group of the Jewish Zealots who used violence against Jews and Romans in the Roman province of Judea. Much of what is known about the Sicarii comes from the Antiquities of the Jews and The Jewish War by Josephus, who wrote that the Sicarii agreed to release the kidnapped secretary of Eleazar, governor of the Temple precincts, in exchange for the release of ten captured assassins. The Sicarii were involved in the murder of High Priest Jonathan and also committed a series of atrocities in an attempt to incite the population into war against Rome. In one account, given in the Talmud, they destroyed the city's food supply, using starvation to force the people to fight against the Roman siege, instead of negotiating peace. Josephus also wrote that the Sicarii raided nearby Hebrew villages including Ein Gedi, where they massacred 700 women and children.
- Persecution of Ebionites and Nazarenes (70–135 CE) – Ebionites were in conflict with the Jewish followers of Bar Kochba for refusing to recognize his messianic claims. According to the Haran Gawaita, Nasoraean Mandaeans fled Jerusalem before its fall in 70 AD due to persecution by a faction of Jews.

== See also ==
- History of the Jews and Judaism in the Land of Israel
- Jewish schisms
- The Saison – 1944–1945 operation in Mandatory Palestine
- Altalena affair – Confrontation between the IDF and Irgun in 1948
