= Jeshanah =

Ancient Biblical city

Jeshanah (Yeshana) was an ancient Biblical city.

== History ==
Yeshana was one of three cities, along with Bethel and Ephraim, that were captured by Abijah of the Kingdom of Judah during his war with Jeroboam of the Kingdom of Israel (2 Chronicles 13:19). Charles Simon Clermont-Ganneau identified Ein Siniya with the Biblical Jeshanah and Isana of Josephus, but modern scholars question its location.
