= Ephraim in the wilderness =

Village referred to in the Gospel of John

The City of Ephraim or Ephraim in the wilderness (Greek: τὴν χώραν ἐγγὺς τῆς ἐρήμου, εἰς Ἐφραὶμ λεγομένην πόλιν) is a city or village in Judea referred to in the New Testament in Gospel of John (John 11:54). According to the Biblical narrative, after Jesus had raised Lazarus from the dead, the Pharisees and Chief Priests began plotting to put Jesus to death, so He retired to Ephraim with his disciples. They departed Jerusalem, shortly before Jesus' final Passover, arriving in Bethany six days before the Passover (John 12:1).

The New King James Version and World English Bible call Ephraim a "city", whereas the New International Version and the New Living Translation call it a "village".

Ephraim was located in the wild, uncultivated hill-country thirteen miles to the northeast of Jerusalem, "perched on a conspicuous eminence and with an extensive view" between the central towns and the Jordan valley. It is probably the same place as Ophrah (Joshua 18:23), Ephron (2 Chronicles 13:19) and the modern Palestinian-Christian city of Taybeh.
