= Ya'akov Meridor =

Irgun member and Israeli politician and businessman

- יעקב מרידור
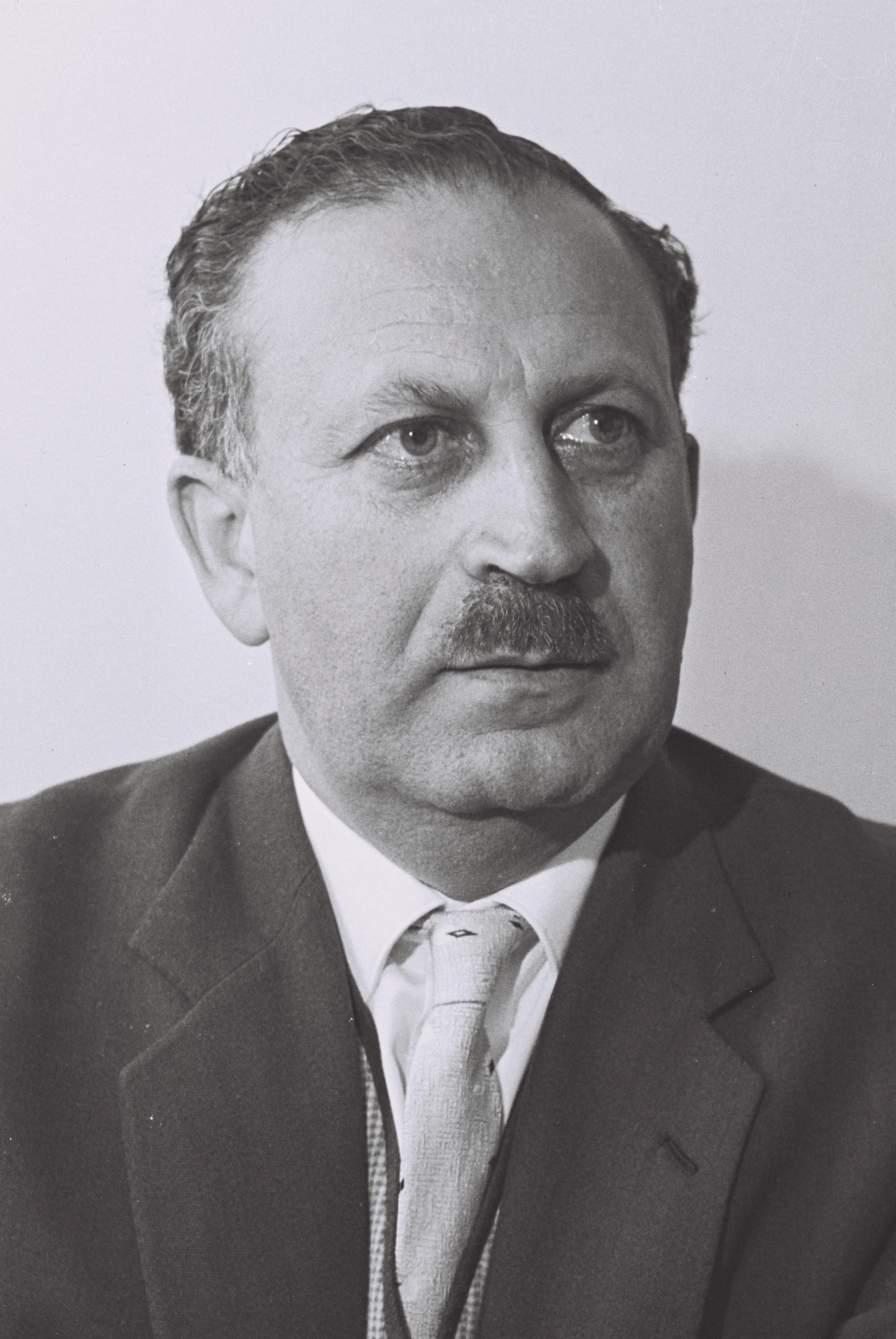

Ministerial roles
- 1981–1984: Minister of Economics & Inter-Ministry Co-ordination

Faction represented in the Knesset
- 1949–1951: Herut
- 1955–1965: Herut
- 1965–1969: Gahal
- 1981–1984: Likud

Personal details
- Born: 29 September 1913 Lipno, Congress Poland, Russian Empire
- Died: 30 June 1995 (aged 81)
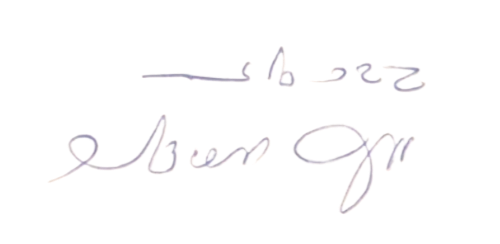
- Signature

Ya'akov Meridor (Hebrew: יעקב מרידור; born Yaakov Viniarsky, 29 September 1913 – 30 June 1995) was an Israeli politician, Irgun commander and businessman. He had no family relationship to Irgun member Eliyahu Meridor, born Wierzbolowsky.

== Biography ==
Yaakov Viniarsky (later Meridor) was born in the Polish town of Lipno to a Jewish family of middle-class merchants. In 1930, after hearing reports of the first Arab rebellion in Mandatory Palestine, he became a member of the Betar Movement. He studied law at the University of Warsaw.

Meridor died in 1995 at the age of 81, and was survived by his three children. He and his wife Ziporah are buried in the Nahalat Yitzhak Cemetery in Givatayim.

== Zionist activism ==
In 1932, he immigrated to Palestine and joined the Irgun a year later. In May 1941, during the Anglo-Iraqi War, he accompanied David Raziel, who had joined the British Army, on a mission to Iraq to sabotage oil fields on the outskirts of Baghdad. When Raziel was killed, Meridor returned to Palestine and took over as Chief Commander of the Irgun.

On 1 December 1943, Meridor handed over command of the Irgun to Menachem Begin, though he continued to hold senior positions in the Irgun until the Haganah handed him over to the British in 1945. He was sent to various detention camps in Africa, and carried out daring escape attempts. He was so eager to escape he refused to take a camp leadership position despite his senior rank in the Irgun.

He finally succeeded in escaping in 1948, and arrived in Israel on 14 May, the day independence was declared. His escape was assisted by a Jew from British-controlled Sudan named Mayer Malka who provided kosher food and visited him when he was a prisoner in African detention camps. He hid in Malka's home in Khartoum prior to returning to Palestine.

Meridor writes in his biography that Menachem Begin was so overjoyed to hear about his escape, that he sent a communique stating that Meridor arrived in Palestine and took part in an operation in Pardes Hanna on 7 April 1948, despite the fact that at the time Meridor was in Paris.

According to Meridor, this is why it was written in an article in The Scotsman that the Irgun announced in Tel Aviv on 7 April 1948 that 'Jacob Meridor' had "taken over his war assignment" in Palestine. The Scotsman also reported that on the previous day, as his first command action, Meridor had led the raid on Pardes Hana military camp south of Haifa, in which six British soldiers and their commanding officer, Lieut-Colonel G.L. Hilderbrand, were killed.

Under Begin, he was charged with the task of managing the Irgun's integration in the newly formed Israel Defense Forces.

== Business career ==
Meridor co-founded a company that imported canned meat. Due to the austerity regulations in force at the time, the company suffered financially and it was bought out by the Israeli government. In 1960, while still in the Knesset, Meridor set up the deep-sea fishing company "Atlantic Fishing Company" jointly with businessman Mila Brenner (1921–1999). In 1962, they set up the shipping company "Maritime Fruit Carriers Company Ltd." with the aim to break into the then highly fragmented oceangoing refrigerated cargo business. By 1969, the company had ten refrigerated ships constructed at a cost of $5 million and with names including Avocadocore, Bananacore, Lemoncore and Mangocore. He found that by travelling at 20 knots (37 km/h; 23 mph), his ships could bring bananas from Ecuador to meet the untapped market for the fruit in Japan, without going overripe. The company grew rapidly, and at its height, operated 42 ships, and also extended its operations to oil shipping and the construction of tankers. As a result of his business activities, Meridor became wealthy. In his book Terror out of Zion, J. Bowyer Bell noted: "One of the greatest transformations has been that of Meridor, who was first elected to the Knesset with the occupation of worker, but who has since become Israel's greatest shipping tycoon, a rival to the Greeks, a man whose photograph has been in Time, who appears more often in Monaco than along Dizengoff Street." The company experienced severe liquidity problems due to the decline in oil shipping during the 1973 oil crisis and ultimately went bust in 1976. Part of its fleet was taken over by the Cunard Line.

== Political career ==
Meridor was one of the founders of Herut and was elected to the Knesset in Israel's first elections. He retained his seat in elections in 1951, 1955, 1959, 1961 and again in 1965 after Herut had merged with the Liberal Party to form Gahal (which later became Likud). He also published a book in 1955, entitled Long is the Path to Freedom: Chronicles of one of the Exiles. However, he lost his seat in the 1969 elections.

Meridor resurrected his political career in 1981 when he was elected to the Knesset on Likud's list. He was appointed Minister of Economics and Inter-Ministry Coordination by Prime Minister Begin, and was seen as a potential future Prime Minister. That same year, his political career was severely damaged by a media fiasco. Meridor announced that a scientist had invented a revolutionary chemical process for energy production which could generate 17,000 kilocalories of energy from an input of 23 kilocalories, a 700-fold output. He used the analogy that this process could use the energy of a simple light bulb to light a city like Ramat Gan. The analogy stuck and created a media frenzy, making front-page news. The developer of the technology was then revealed to be Danny Berman, a hoaxer with multiple fraud convictions. Meridor became a national laughingstock. He refused to resign, and retained his ministerial position when Yitzhak Shamir took over from Begin in 1983, but lost his seat again in the 1984 elections. He did not return to the Knesset.

=== Commemoration ===
Streets were named after him in the Tel Baruch neighborhood in Tel Aviv-Yafo, in the Kfar Ganim neighborhood in Petah Tikva, in Ashkelon and in Beer Sheva. On 27 April 2003, the Israel Post issued a stamp in memory of Meridor.
