= Eliyahu Lankin =

Israeli politician (1914–1994)

- אליהו לנקין
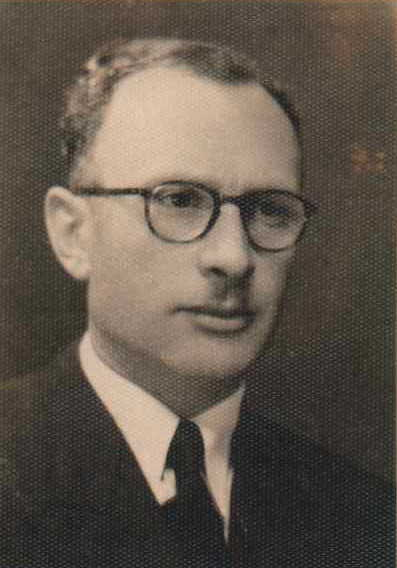

Faction represented in the Knesset
- 1949–1951: Herut

Personal details
- Born: 25 September 1914 Gomel, Russian Empire
- Died: 10 August 1994 (aged 79)

Eliyahu Lankin (Hebrew: אליהו לנקין; 25 September 1914 – 10 August 1994) was a Revisionist Zionist activist, Irgun member and an Israeli politician.

== Biography ==
Eliyahu Lankin was born in Gomel, and moved with his family to Manchuria at the age of three in the wake of the October Revolution. He studied at the Russian High School in Harbin. At the age of 16, he joined Betar and immigrated to Mandatory Palestine three years later.

Lankin died in 1994, and was buried on Har HaMenuchot. A street in Jerusalem in the neighborhood of Arnona was named after him.

== Political activism ==
In 1934, Lankin joined the Irgun. From 1935 to 1939, he was a member of the Notrim, responsible for defending Jewish lives and property from Arab raids. As an Irgun member, he participated in landing illegal Jewish immigrants on Palestine's Mediterranean coast. In May 1944, he was appointed Commander of the Jerusalem District. He took part in the attack on the British intelligence office in Jerusalem in July 1944. In December 1944, he was arrested by the British as a result of informing by the Haganah and was exiled to Africa. After several attempts, he succeeded—the only one of 107 prisoners—in escaping from the camp in Eritrea on November 10, 1945. Eventually, he arrived in Paris in January 1947 and was appointed commander of the Irgun headquarters in Europe. He commanded the Altalena, which he brought to Israel. After coming ashore, he was arrested by the Israeli government and was kept in administrative detention for two months, along with four other Irgun commanders.

On release, he joined the IDF, graduated from an officer's course, and was a battalion commander.

He served as a member of the first Knesset, representing Herut. Later, he studied law at the Hebrew University, and was certified as a lawyer in 1954. He was a member of the Israel Broadcasting Authority and was a trustee of the Hebrew University.

== Diplomatic career ==
After the Likud's rise to power, he was appointed ambassador to South Africa, serving from 1981 to 1985. In 1983, Israeli Prime Minister Menachem Begin named Lankin ambassador to the United Kingdom. The British government was outraged over his selection due to his Irgun past, and warned that it would harm Anglo-Israeli relations. The crisis was resolved when Lankin declined the offer and continued to serve as ambassador to South Africa.
