= Joshua 4 =

Book of Joshua, chapter 4

- ← chapter 3 chapter 5 →
- The pages containing the Book of Joshua in Leningrad Codex (1008 CE).
- Book: Book of Joshua
- Hebrew Bible part: Nevi'im
- Order in the Hebrew part: 1
- Category: Former Prophets
- Christian Bible part: Old Testament
- Order in the Christian part: 6

Joshua 4 is the fourth chapter of the Book of Joshua in the Hebrew Bible or in the Old Testament of the Christian Bible. According to Jewish tradition the book was attributed to Joshua, with additions by the high priests Eleazar and Phinehas, but modern scholars view it as part of the Deuteronomistic History, which spans the books of Deuteronomy to 2 Kings, attributed to nationalistic and devotedly Yahwistic writers during the time of the reformer Judean king Josiah in 7th century BCE. This chapter focuses on the Israelites crossing the Jordan River westward into the land of Canaan under the leadership of Joshua, a part of a section comprising Joshua 1:1–5:12 about the entry to the land of Canaan.

== Text ==
This chapter was originally written in the Hebrew language. It is divided into 24 verses.

=== Textual witnesses ===
Some early manuscripts containing the text of this chapter in Hebrew are of the Masoretic Text tradition, which includes the Codex Cairensis (895), Aleppo Codex (10th century), and Codex Leningradensis (1008). Fragments containing parts of this chapter in Hebrew were found among the Dead Sea Scrolls including 4Q48 (4QJosh^{b}; 100–50 BCE) with extant verses 1, 3.

Extant ancient manuscripts of a translation into Koine Greek known as the Septuagint (originally was made in the last few centuries BCE) include Codex Vaticanus (B; $\mathfrak{G}$^{B}; 4th century) and Codex Alexandrinus (A; $\mathfrak{G}$^{A}; 5th century). (Note: The whole book of Joshua is missing from the extant Codex Sinaiticus.) Fragments of the Septuagint Greek text containing this chapter is found in manuscripts such as Washington Manuscript I (5th century CE), and a reduced version of the Septuagint text is found in the illustrated Joshua Roll.

== Analysis ==
The narrative of Israelites entering the land of Canaan comprises verses 1:1 to 5:12 of the Book of Joshua and has the following outline:

A. Preparations for Entering the Land (1:1–18)

1. Directives to Joshua (1:1–9)
2. Directives to the Leaders (1:10–11)
3. Discussions with the Eastern Tribes (1:12–18)

B. Rahab and the Spies in Jericho (2:1–24)

1. Directives to the Spies (2:1a)
2. Deceiving the King of Jericho (2:1b–7)
3. The Oath with Rahab (2:8–21)
4. The Report to Joshua (2:22–24)

C. Crossing the Jordan (3:1–4:24)

1. Initial Preparations for Crossing (3:1–6)
2. Directives for Crossing (3:7–13)
3. A Miraculous Crossing: Part 1 (3:14–17)
4. Twelve-Stone Memorial: Part 1 (4:1–10a)
5. A Miraculous Crossing: Part 2 (4:10b–18)
6. Twelve-Stone Memorial: Part 2 (4:19–24)

D. Circumcision and Passover (5:1–12)

1. Canaanite Fear (5:1)
2. Circumcision (5:2–9)
3. Passover (5:10–12)

== Twelve Stones from the Jordan (4:1–18) ==
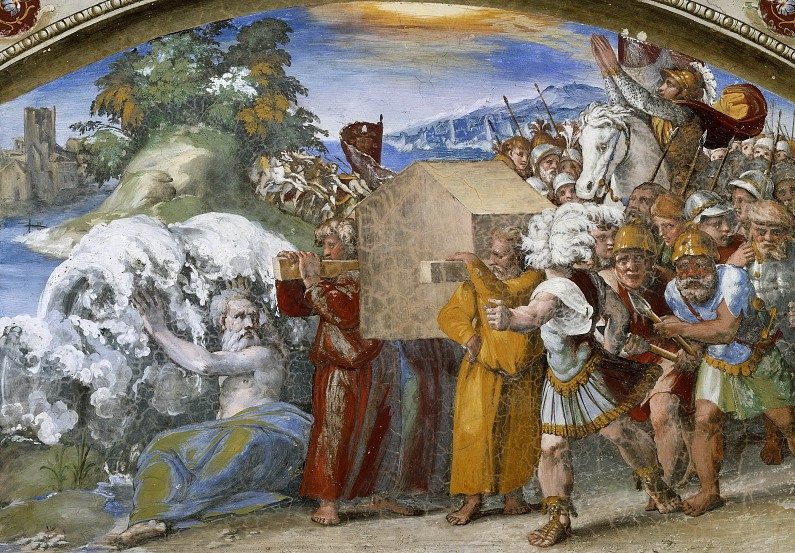
"Israelites Crossing the Jordan Carrying the Ark of the Covenant", by Raphael in the Vatican. 7 January 1500

The crossing of the Jordan narrative (3:1–5:1) consists of several units that backtrack and overlap, with a number of elements recounted more than once (e.g. the selection of men to carry the stones, 3:12; 4:2; the setting up of the stones, 4:8–9, 20). In contrast to chapter 3, this chapter places more emphasis on the setting of twelve stones during and after the crossing. Just as the directive the priest in Joshua 3:6 is only resolved in Joshua 3:16, the directive to the twelve men, one from each tribe of Israel, in Joshua 3:12 is clarified in Joshua 4:2 that they are to carry stones from the midst of the Jordan to the place of destination for the camp. The account is also instituting an act of worship for all future generations (verses 6–7, 21–22), similar to the narrative of the first Passover (cf. Exodus 12:24–27). Joshua's importance (verses 10–14) echoes earlier passage (3:7–8). The priests remained in the middle of dry river bed with the ark until the complete crossing of the people and the ceremonies with the stones (4:10), before finally ascended to the west bank and when they did the river resumes its normal flow (4:15–18).

=== Verse 1 ===
And it came to pass, when all the people had completely crossed over the Jordan, that the Lord spoke to Joshua, saying:

Hebrew text (read from right to left):

ויהי כאשר־תמו כל־הגוי לעבור את־הירדן פ ויאמר יהוה אל־יהושע לאמר׃

In the middle of the verse in Hebrew text, after the phrase "all the people had completely crossed over the Jordan", there is a petuhah (open paragraph sign) from an old pre-Masoretic mark, which the Masorites have retained, marking the end of the previous paragraph and the beginning of a new parashah or "paragraph". The next phrase (in literal Hebrew translation: "and spoke YHWH to Joshua, saying"), together with verses 2, 3 and 4 ("and Joshua called the twelve men"), form a 'parenthesis' (as also pointed out by, among others, Kimchi and Calvin), joined together here by consecutive waw (a form of historical Hebrew composition), that is supposed to be arranged in logical order with their proper subordination to one another to be rendered as "Then Joshua called the twelve men — as Jehovah had commanded him, saying, 'Take you twelve men out of the people,' etc. — and said to them," etc.

== Camp at Gilgal (4:19–24) ==
The date of the Jordan crossing is significant, the tenth day of the 'first month' in relation to the Passover celebration, when the paschal lamb was set apart for the feast (Exodus 12:2–3), thus linking the Exodus (the crossing of the Reed Sea), and the entry into the land of promise. The stones taken from the river are set up in the Israelite camp at Gilgal (verse 20), for the purpose of the demonstration of God's power so 'that all the peoples of the earth might know it', thus pointing towards the future triumphs of YHWH, which greatly terrifying the inhabitants of the land (Joshua 5:1).

=== Verse 19 ===
And the people came up out of Jordan on the tenth day of the first month, and encamped in Gilgal, in the east border of Jericho.

- "The tenth day of the first month": Four days before the Passover, and the very day when the paschal lamb is required to be set apart (the first time exactly forty years ago: Exodus 12:3 "a lamb for an house"). The first month is elsewhere in the Hebrew Bible called "Abib", that is, “the month of green ears” (Exodus 13:4; Exodus 23:15; Deuteronomy 16:1), and subsequently after the captivity in Babylon is called “Nisan” (Nehemiah 2:1; Esther 3:7).
- "Gilgal": from a Hebrew word denoting 'a circular encampment', proleptically used in Joshua 4:19 and Joshua 4:20 to call the first location of the Israelite camp after crossing the Jordan River (cf. Joshua 5:9). It was "about five miles" (50 stadia, according to Josephus) "from the river banks" and about a mile and a quarter from Jericho, according to Josephus. Joshua 5:3 describes it as a rising ground, but it is difficult to identify the spot in modern times, since there never existed any town or village there.

== See also ==
- Ark of the Covenant
- Children of Israel
- Egypt
- Gilgal
- Jericho
- Jordan River
- Kohen
- Moses
- Nun
- Passage of the Red Sea
- Tribe of Gad
- Tribe of Manasseh
- Tribe of Reuben
- Tribes of Israel
- Related Bible parts: Exodus 12, Exodus 14, Joshua 3, Joshua 5

== Sources ==
- Coogan, Michael David (2007). Coogan, Michael David; Brettler, Marc Zvi; Newsom, Carol Ann; Perkins, Pheme (eds.). The New Oxford Annotated Bible with the Apocryphal/Deuterocanonical Books: New Revised Standard Version, Issue 48 (Augmented 3rd ed.). Oxford University Press. ISBN 978-0195288810.
- Firth, David G. (2021). Joshua: Evangelical Biblical Theology Commentary. Evangelical Biblical Theology Commentary (EBTC) (illustrated ed.). Lexham Press. ISBN 9781683594406.
- Fitzmyer, Joseph A. (2008). A Guide to the Dead Sea Scrolls and Related Literature. Grand Rapids, MI: William B. Eerdmans Publishing Company. ISBN 9780802862419.
- Halley, Henry H. (1965). Halley's Bible Handbook: an abbreviated Bible commentary (24th (revised) ed.). Zondervan Publishing House. ISBN 0-310-25720-4.
- Hayes, Christine (2015). Introduction to the Bible. Yale University Press. ISBN 978-0300188271.
- McConville, Gordon (2007). "9. Joshua". In Barton, John; Muddiman, John (eds.). The Oxford Bible Commentary (first (paperback) ed.). Oxford University Press. pp. 158–176. ISBN 978-0199277186.
- Rösel, Hartmut N. (2011). Joshua. Historical commentary on the Old Testament. Vol. 6 (illustrated ed.). Peeters. ISBN 978-9042925922.
- Ulrich, Eugene, ed. (2010). The Biblical Qumran Scrolls: Transcriptions and Textual Variants. Brill.
- Würthwein, Ernst (1995). The Text of the Old Testament. Translated by Rhodes, Erroll F. Grand Rapids, MI: Wm. B. Eerdmans. ISBN 0-8028-0788-7.
