= Joshua 3 =

Book of Joshua, chapter 3

- ← chapter 2 chapter 4 →
- The pages containing the Book of Joshua in Leningrad Codex (1008 CE).
- Book: Book of Joshua
- Hebrew Bible part: Nevi'im
- Order in the Hebrew part: 1
- Category: Former Prophets
- Christian Bible part: Old Testament
- Order in the Christian part: 6

Joshua 3 is the third chapter of the Book of Joshua in the Hebrew Bible or in the Old Testament of the Christian Bible. According to the biblical historic account, the book was attributed to Joshua, with additions by the high priests Eleazar and Phinehas, but modern scholars view it as part of the Deuteronomistic History, which spans the books of Deuteronomy to 2 Kings, attributed to nationalistic and devotedly Yahwistic writers during the time of the reformer Judean king Josiah in 7th century BCE. This chapter focuses on the Israelites crossing the Jordan River westward into the land of Canaan under the leadership of Joshua, a part of a section comprising Joshua 1:1–5:12 about the entry to the land of Canaan.

== Text ==
This chapter was originally written in the Hebrew language. It is divided into 17 verses.

=== Textual witnesses ===
Some early manuscripts containing the text of this chapter in Hebrew are of the Masoretic Text tradition, which includes the Codex Cairensis (895), Aleppo Codex (10th century), and Codex Leningradensis (1008). Fragments containing parts of this chapter in Hebrew were found among the Dead Sea Scrolls including 4Q48 (4QJosh^{b}; 100–50 BCE) with extant verses 15–17.

Extant ancient manuscripts of a translation into Koine Greek known as the Septuagint (originally was made in the last few centuries BCE) include Codex Vaticanus (B; $\mathfrak{G}$^{B}; 4th century) and Codex Alexandrinus (A; $\mathfrak{G}$^{A}; 5th century). (Note: The whole book of Joshua is missing from the extant Codex Sinaiticus.) Fragments of the Septuagint Greek text containing this chapter is found in manuscripts such as Washington Manuscript I (5th century CE), and a reduced version of the Septuagint text is found in the illustrated Joshua Roll.

== Analysis ==
The narrative of Israelites entering the land of Canaan comprises verses 1:1 to 5:12 of the Book of Joshua and has the following outline:

A. Preparations for Entering the Land (1:1–18)

1. Directives to Joshua (1:1–9)
2. Directives to the Leaders (1:10–11)
3. Discussions with the Eastern Tribes (1:12–18)

B. Rahab and the Spies in Jericho (2:1–24)

1. Directives to the Spies (2:1a)
2. Deceiving the King of Jericho (2:1b–7)
3. The Oath with Rahab (2:8–21)
4. The Report to Joshua (2:22–24)

C. Crossing the Jordan (3:1–4:24)

1. Initial Preparations for Crossing (3:1–6)
2. Directives for Crossing (3:7–13)
3. A Miraculous Crossing: Part 1 (3:14–17)
4. Twelve-Stone Memorial: Part 1 (4:1–10a)
5. A Miraculous Crossing: Part 2 (4:10b–18)
6. Twelve-Stone Memorial: Part 2 (4:19–24)

D. Circumcision and Passover (5:1–12)

1. Canaanite Fear (5:1)
2. Circumcision (5:2–9)
3. Passover (5:10–12)

== Preparations and directives of the crossing (3:1–13) ==
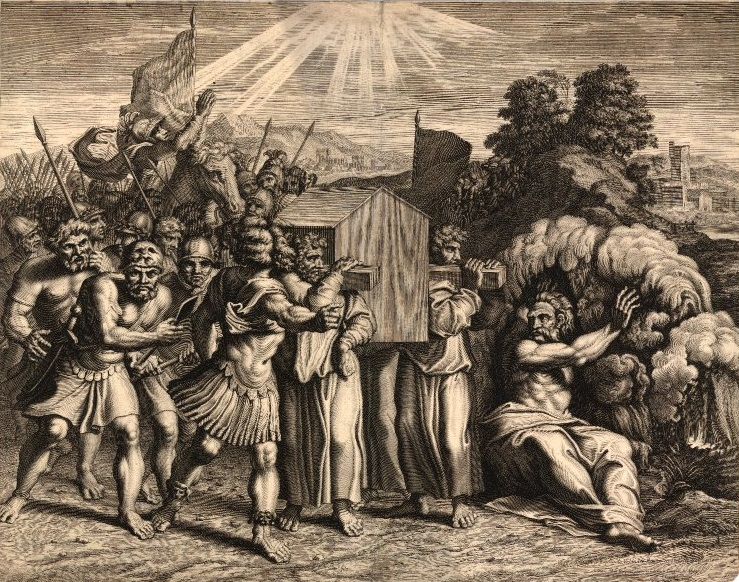
"Israelites led by Joshua Crossing the Jordan River". Robert Hecquet, c. 1720-1775.

The crossing of the Jordan narrative (3:1–5:1) consists of several units that backtrack and overlap, with a number of elements recounted more than once (e.g. the selection of men to carry the stones, 3:12; 4:2; the setting up of the stones, 4:8–9, 20). It includes a miraculous parting of the waters (Joshua 3:16) which recalls the crossing of the Reed Sea (Exodus 14:21–22; cf. Psalm 114:3, 5; Micah 6:4–5), to be followed by the first Passover kept in the new land (Joshua 5:10-12) corresponding to the first ever Passover in Egypt (Exodus 12–13). The centrality of the Ark of the Covenant in the whole narrative emphasizes the guidance of YHWH on the way into the land, and the preparation for the Holy War ahead (verse 10; Numbers 10:33–36), although the differences in the terminology of the ark throughout this chapter may indicate diverse origins:

- Verse 3: Ark of the covenant of YHWH
- Verses 6,8: Ark of the covenant
- Verse 11: Ark of the covenant of the Lord of all the earth
- Verse 13: Ark of YHWH, the Lord of all the earth
- Verse 15: Ark
- Verse 17: The ark of the covenant of YHWH

The crossing narrative is connected to that of the spies (chapter 2) by the mention of Shittim (3:1), as well as bringing Joshua, together with 'all the Israelites', to the verge of Jordan for the crossing (cf. verse 17), where the officers play their part to observe the due timing of three days (verses 2–3; cf. 1:10–11). The crossing respects the requirements of holiness, the ark being attended by the properly authorized personnel (verses. 3, 6; cf. Numbers 3:5–10, 31), and the people keeping due distance, recalling the encounter with YHWH at Sinai (cf. Exodus 19:10–12). The preparations also include a reaffirmation of Joshua's leadership, and of YHWH's special promise to accompany him (3:7; cf. 1:5) throughout his conquest (verses 10–11; cf. Exodus 3:17). The phrase 'the LORD, the Lord of all the earth' (verse 13; cf. Micah 4:13; Psalm 97:5) states a claim to absolute universal dominion, as also found in other ancient Near-Eastern documents for local deities, for examples, Baal in Ugarit literature is written as zbl b'I arș ('the prince, lord of the earth').

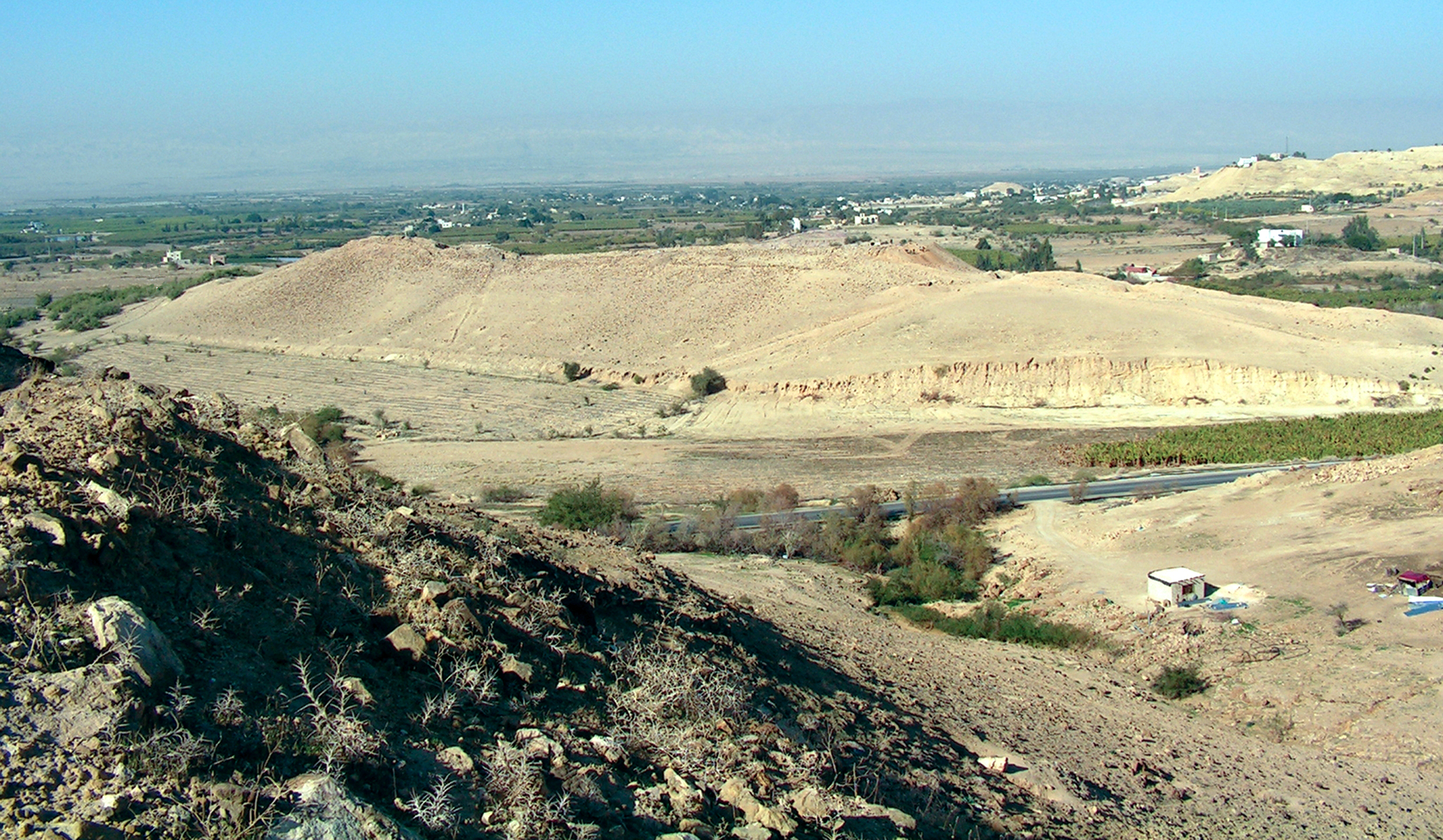
Tell el-Hammam overlooking the Jordan Valley (2007)

=== Verse 1 ===
And Joshua rose early in the morning; and they removed from Shittim, and came to Jordan, he and all the children of Israel, and lodged there before they passed over.

- "Joshua rose early in the morning": a phrase that was used multiple times in the Book of Joshua (3:1; 6:12; 7:16; 8:10) showing 'his eagerness to act promptly and in full accord with divine instructions.
- "Shittim": identified as modern "Tell el-Ḥammām", on the eastern side of Jordan valley, opposite Jericho. Here it is written in the same short form as in Numbers 25:1, not in the longer form as in Numbers 33:49. The distance to the edge of Jordan river itself is about 10 kilometres (6.2 mi).

== Crossing the Jordan (3:14–17) ==
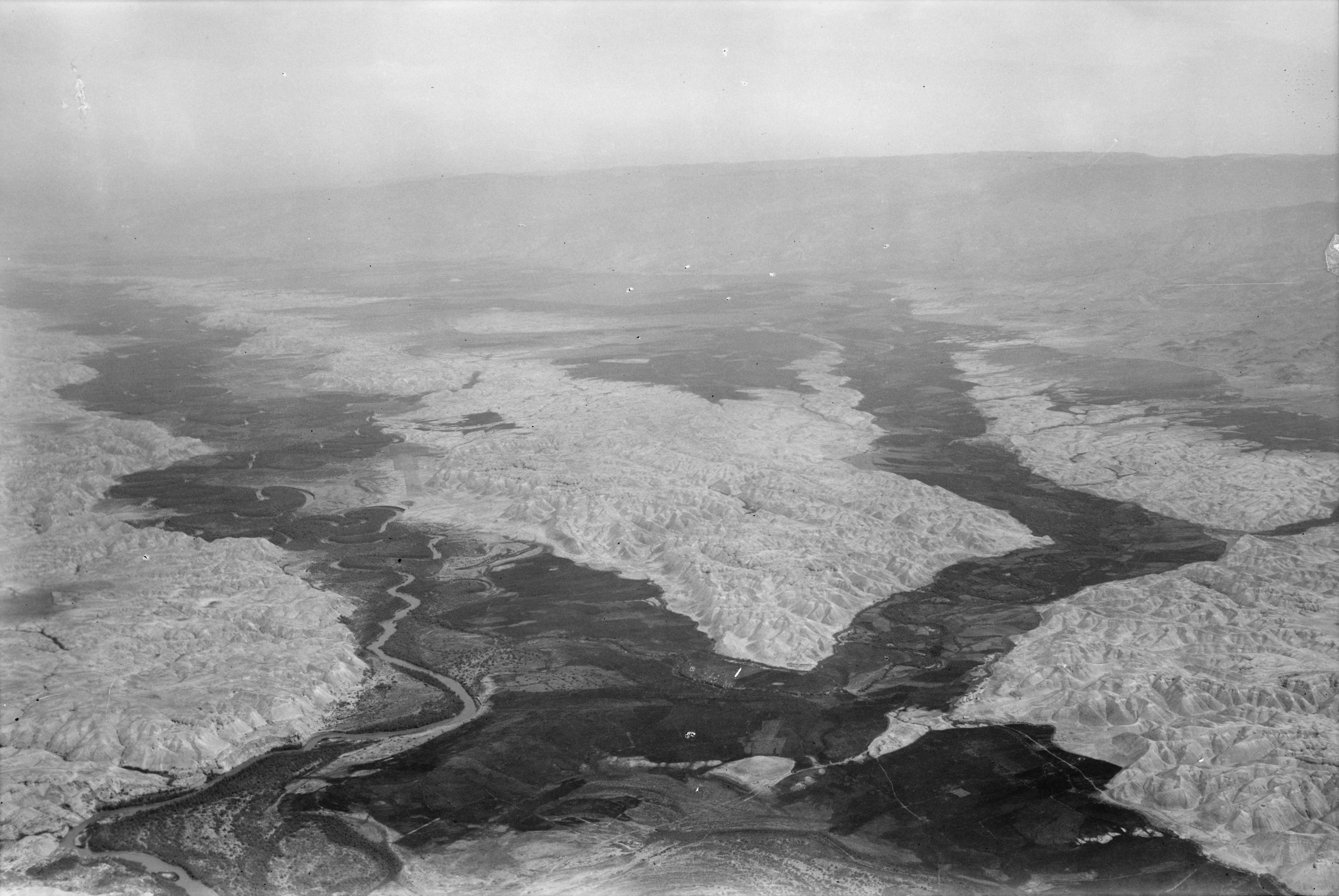
Aerial view of Jordan River in the district of Damieh (="Adam"), where Jabok River joins the Jordan. 1931.

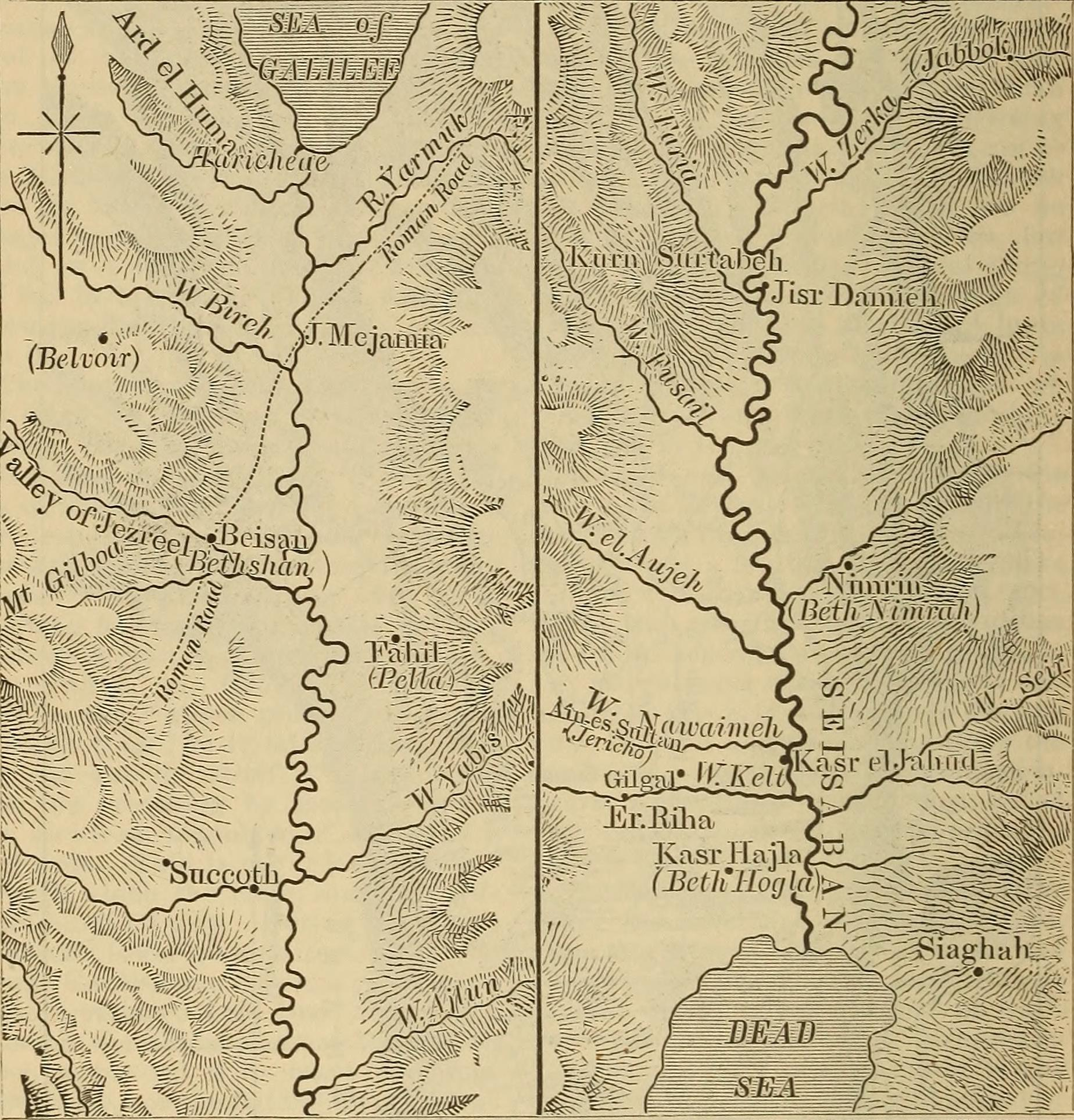
Right panel: in the upper middle area has "Jisr Damieh" (= "Adam"), lower left part (under "W. Nawaimeh") has "Jericho". 1887

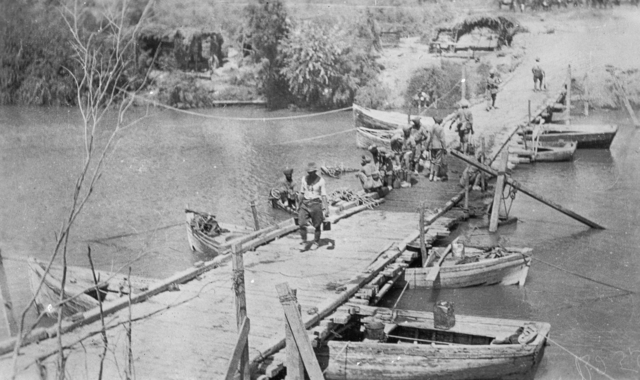
The bridge at Damieh (="Adam"), over the Jordan River, on the main road between Nablus and Es Salt Road, used by the New Zealand Mounted Rifles Brigade during World War 1, 1918.

After all the preparations, an initial report of the crossing was given, with a note that it was miraculous, as the river being in its spring flood (verse 15) was suddenly cut off of its flow of water, leaving a dry land to walk on (verse 16). This passage anticipates a fuller account in the following chapter.

=== Verses 14–16 ===
^{14} So when the people set out from their tents to pass over the Jordan with the priests bearing the ark of the covenant before the people, ^{15} and as soon as those bearing the ark had come as far as the Jordan, and the feet of the priests bearing the ark were dipped in the brink of the water (now the Jordan overflows all its banks throughout the time of harvest), ^{16} the waters coming down from above stood and rose up in a heap very far away, at Adam, the city that is beside Zarethan, and those flowing down toward the Sea of the Arabah, the Salt Sea, were completely cut off. And the people passed over opposite Jericho.

- "The waters coming down from above stood and rose up in a heap": Many times in recorded history, earthquakes caused landslides and other disruptions leading to a blockage of the Jordan River for one or two days (and also the fall of Jericho walls). Humphreys relates this to Psalm 114:1, 3 ("When Israel went out of Egypt,... Jordan was driven back.")
- "Adam": identified by Humphreys with modern "Damiya" ("Damieh" or Jisr ed Damieh; al with the same root word dm), about 17 miles (27 km) north of Jericho, on the east bank of Jordan, and is mentioned in multiple historical records as the place where the Jordan River was blocked due to the seismic activities in the area. Garstang reported a blockage of Jordan in 1927, and a report by an Arabic historian, Nowairi, related to the building of a bridge in 1266 over the Jordan in Damieh on the order of Baybars I, king of Mamluk Egypt and Syria (1260-1277), that on the night of 7 Desember 1267, one part of the wall on the side fell into the river and caused the flow to be dammed from midnight to "the fourth hour" (about 10:30 in the morning), which provided the opportunity to repair the bridge. In 1546 a strong earthquake, documented in three separate sources, caused the damming of Jordan. One source is a letter in Italian sent to a nobleman in Venice and published in Wittenberg, Germany, in 1546, stating that Jordan River was dry for two days, whereas a Spanish document describing the same event notes that the river stopped for one full day, and the third source in Hebrew by Isaac Levy and published in 1562 states that foreigners reported about the Jordan river being dry for three days, because two big hills fell into the river. The reports indicate that the flow of Jordan can be blocked due to landslide or earthquake.

== See also ==
- Amorites
- Ark of the Covenant
- Canaanites
- Children of Israel
- Cubit
- Egypt
- Girgashites
- Hittites
- Hivites
- Jebusites
- Jericho
- Jordan River
- Kohen
- Levite
- Moses
- Nun
- Passage of the Red Sea
- Perizzites
- Sanctification
- Tribes of Israel
- Related Bible parts: Exodus 12, Exodus 14, Joshua 1

== Sources ==
- Coogan, Michael David (2007). Coogan, Michael David; Brettler, Marc Zvi; Newsom, Carol Ann; Perkins, Pheme (eds.). The New Oxford Annotated Bible with the Apocryphal/Deuterocanonical Books: New Revised Standard Version, Issue 48 (Augmented 3rd ed.). Oxford University Press. ISBN 978-0195288810.
- Firth, David G. (2021). Joshua: Evangelical Biblical Theology Commentary. Evangelical Biblical Theology Commentary (EBTC) (illustrated ed.). Lexham Press. ISBN 9781683594406.
- Fitzmyer, Joseph A. (2008). A Guide to the Dead Sea Scrolls and Related Literature. Grand Rapids, MI: William B. Eerdmans Publishing Company. ISBN 9780802862419.
- Halley, Henry H. (1965). Halley's Bible Handbook: an abbreviated Bible commentary (24th (revised) ed.). Zondervan Publishing House. ISBN 0-310-25720-4.
- Hayes, Christine (2015). Introduction to the Bible. Yale University Press. ISBN 978-0300188271.
- Humphreys, Colin (2009). The Miracles of Exodus: A Scientist's Discovery of the Extraordinary Natural Causes of the Biblical Stories. Zondervan.
- McConville, Gordon (2007). "9. Joshua". In Barton, John; Muddiman, John (eds.). The Oxford Bible Commentary (first (paperback) ed.). Oxford University Press. pp. 158–176. ISBN 978-0199277186.
- Rösel, Hartmut N. (2011). Joshua. Historical commentary on the Old Testament. Vol. 6 (illustrated ed.). Peeters. ISBN 978-9042925922.
- Ulrich, Eugene, ed. (2010). The Biblical Qumran Scrolls: Transcriptions and Textual Variants. Brill.
- Würthwein, Ernst (1995). The Text of the Old Testament. Translated by Rhodes, Erroll F. Grand Rapids, MI: Wm. B. Eerdmans. ISBN 0-8028-0788-7.
