= The Harlot's House =

Poem by Oscar Wilde

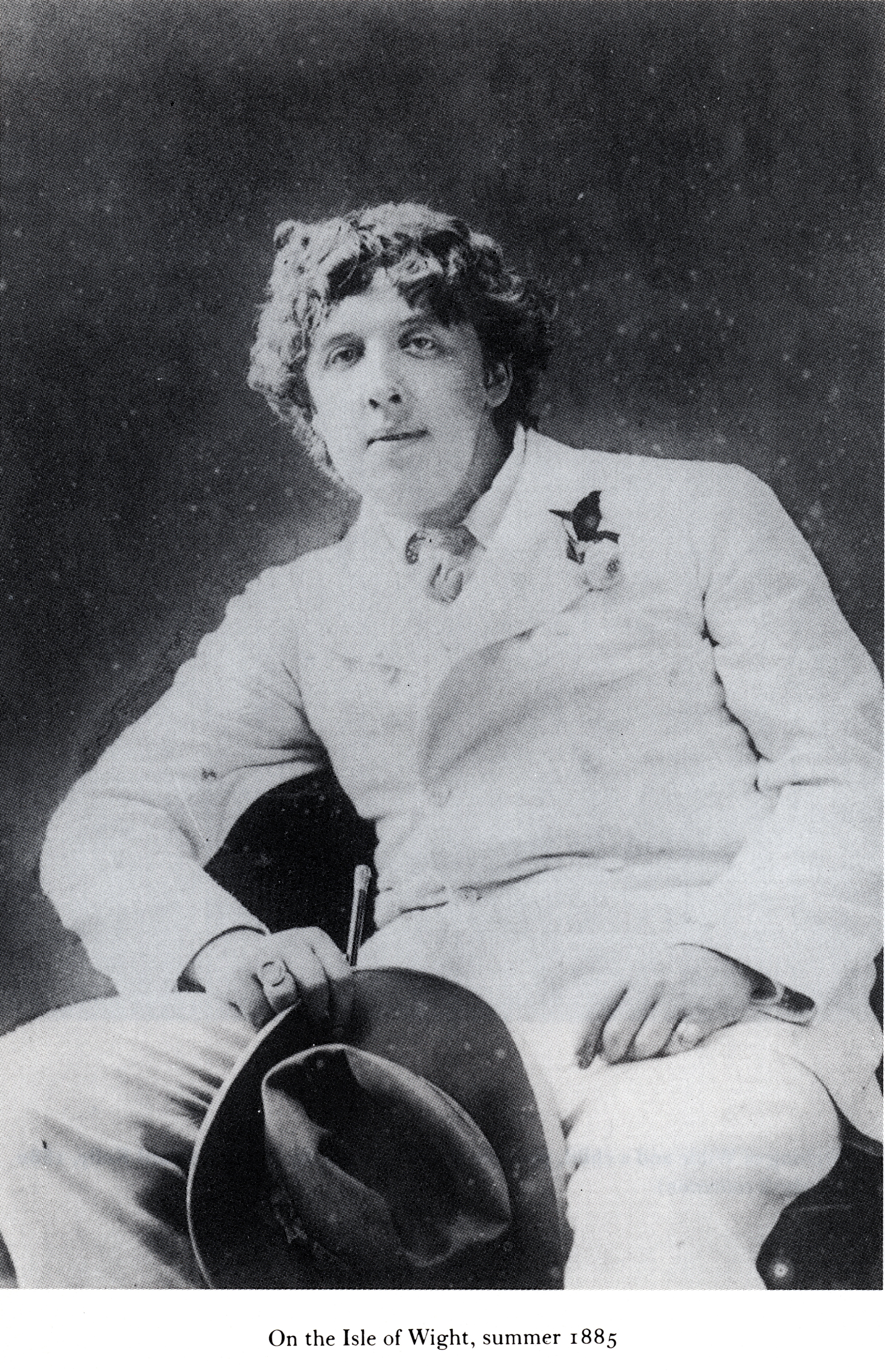
Oscar Wilde in the year "The Harlot's House" was published

"The Harlot's House" (1885) is a 36-line poem in terza rima by Oscar Wilde. It touches on the issue of prostitution in a style which can be seen as either Aesthetic or Decadent. It is considered one of Wilde's finest poems, and has been set to music several times.

== Synopsis ==
Wandering down a city street by night, the poet and his companion stop outside "the Harlot's house", hearing uproarious noise including a band playing dance-music. They see the shadows of dancers on the blinds, looking like automatons or skeletons. Sometimes one or other of them, "a horrible Marionette", comes out to smoke a cigarette. "The dead are dancing with the dead", the poet says to his love, but she walks inside: "Love passed into the house of Lust". Then the dance ends,

And down the long and silent street,
The dawn with silver-sandalled feet,
Crept like a frightened girl.

== Composition ==
A holograph manuscript of an early version of "The Harlot's House", dated April 1882, is preserved in the William Andrews Clark Memorial Library, Los Angeles. The final version of the poem was, according to Wilde's friend and biographer Robert Sherard, written in the spring of 1883 while the author was staying at the Hôtel Voltaire in Paris, and this account is probably accurate. Sherard records Wilde picking up a demi-mondaine outside a Paris music hall at this time, and the next day remarking, "Robert, what animals we are", a story which suggests the possibility that the poem reflects Wilde's own experiences.

== Publication ==
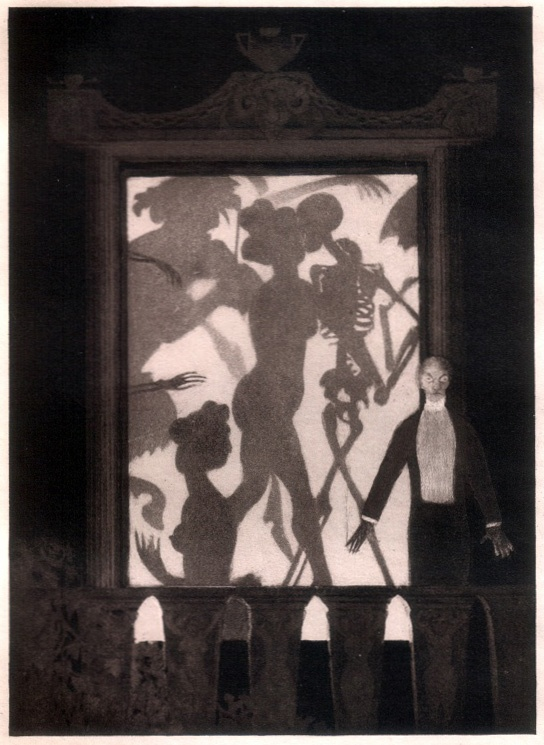
Illustration by Althea Gyles from Leonard Smithers' edition of "The Harlot's House"

Wilde published "The Harlot's House" in The Dramatic Review on 11 April 1885, but it was never reprinted elsewhere for the rest of his life. In 1899, the year before his death, he discussed with Leonard Smithers and the artist Althea Gyles the possibility of publishing "The Harlot's House". This project reached fruition, albeit without the permission of Wilde's estate, in 1904 as a pamphlet with five black-and-white illustrations by Gyles. It was reissued in a limited edition in 1905. "The Harlot's House" was collected in the 1905 US edition of Wilde's Poems and the 1908 UK one.

== Sources ==
The title may owe something to Joshua 2:1, "And they went, and came into an harlot's house", but more secular influences on the body of the poem have been detected from the French Decadent poets and from Edgar Allan Poe. The theme, originally medieval, of the dance of death, and some of the phrasing, may have been suggested by Baudelaire's "Danse macabre" (in Les Fleurs du mal), Gautier's "Bûchers et tombeaux" and "Variations sur le Carnaval de Venise" (in Émaux et Camées), Poe's "The Haunted Palace" (in "The Fall of the House of Usher") or his "The Masque of the Red Death". Wilde seems to allude to Prince Prospero and "The Masque of the Red Death" when in the 1882 holograph manuscript he writes "the Prince's house" before crossing out "Prince" and substituting "Harlot."

== Themes and style ==
Literary historians disagree as to whether "The Harlot's House" should be considered an example of Aestheticism or whether it was the first instance in English poetry of the French Decadent style. The poem uses the language of music, dance and drama, which is of the theatrical world Wilde had become involved in, to evoke a cosmopolitan scene. The precise locale is not specified, but it feels more like Paris than London. It treats the theme of prostitution in a way which is aestheticized, and indeed sensual, but at the same time macabre and unsettling, the poet seeming to be simultaneously appalled and fascinated, disgusted and enticed by the inmates of the harlot's house. The poem was written at a time when there was much popular agitation against English laws which criminalized prostitutes but not their customers, and it seems to take a moral stand on this social problem. This might seem to be at variance with Wilde's declared belief in the cause of art for art's sake, but it is hardly a unique case: many other 19th-century writers who proclaimed art's independence from morality nevertheless wrote work which admits of conventionally moral readings.

== Reception ==
On first publication, "The Harlot's House" made a great stir. Wilde's friend Frank Harris later remembered the author's admirers acclaiming it. "On all sides one was asked: 'Have you seen Oscar's latest?' And then the last verse would be quoted – 'Divine, don't ye think?'". Other readers were shocked at the poem's subject-matter, and it was sufficiently notorious to provoke a parody, "The Public-House", published two months later in The Sporting Times.

Today, it is one of the handful of poems on which Wilde's reputation as a poet rests. When Penguin Books published their Major Works of Oscar Wilde only three of his poems were included, The Ballad of Reading Gaol, The Sphinx, and "The Harlot's House". It has been called a stylistic and technical tour de force, and has been said to have proved, along with a few others of his best poems, "his ability to compose, had he but dared, a body of poems, on themes of sin, suffering and remorse, which might have been the Fleurs du Mal of English literature".

Eugene O'Neill quotes from "The Harlot's House" in his play Long Day's Journey into Night (1941).

== Musical settings ==
"The Harlot's House" has been adapted several times, either separately or in conjunction with other poems, by notable composers:

- Comitas, Alexander. Dawn, for mixed chorus a capella, op. 11 No. 1 (1983).
- Gregson, Edward. The Dance, Forever the Dance, for mezzo-soprano, SATB chorus and orchestra (1999).
- Parker, Jim. Oscar Wilde: Symphony in Yellow, symphony for speaker and orchestra (1999).
- Pasatieri, Thomas. Three Poems of Oscar Wilde, songs for baritone and piano (1998).
- Stevenson, Ronald. The Harlot's House, dance poem, for free-bass accordion, timpani, and percussion (1988).
- Swann, Donald. The Poetic Image, song cycle for medium voice and piano (1991).
