= Joshua 6 =

Book of Joshua, chapter 6

- ← chapter 5 chapter 7 →
- The pages containing the Book of Joshua in Leningrad Codex (1008 CE).
- Book: Book of Joshua
- Hebrew Bible part: Nevi'im
- Order in the Hebrew part: 1
- Category: Former Prophets
- Christian Bible part: Old Testament
- Order in the Christian part: 6

Joshua 6 is the sixth chapter of the Book of Joshua in the Hebrew Bible or in the Old Testament of the Christian Bible. According to Jewish tradition the book was attributed to Joshua, with additions by the high priests Eleazar and Phinehas, but modern scholars view it as part of the Deuteronomistic History, which spans the books of Deuteronomy to 2 Kings, attributed to nationalistic and devotedly Yahwistic writers during the time of the reformer Judean king Josiah in 7th century BCE. This chapter focuses on the Battle of Jericho under the leadership of Joshua, a part of a section comprising Joshua 5:13–12:24 about the conquest of Canaan.

== Text ==
This chapter was originally written in the Hebrew language. It is divided into 27 verses.

=== Textual witnesses ===
Some early manuscripts containing the text of this chapter in Hebrew are of the Masoretic Text tradition, which includes the Codex Cairensis (895), Aleppo Codex (10th century), and Codex Leningradensis (1008). Fragments containing parts of this chapter in Hebrew were found among the Dead Sea Scrolls including 4Q47 (4QJosh^{a}; 200–100 BCE) with extant verses 5–10.

Extant ancient manuscripts of a translation into Koine Greek known as the Septuagint (originally was made in the last few centuries BCE) include Codex Vaticanus (B; $\mathfrak{G}$^{B}; 4th century) and Codex Alexandrinus (A; $\mathfrak{G}$^{A}; 5th century). (Note: The whole book of Joshua is missing from the extant Codex Sinaiticus.)

Fragments of the Septuagint Greek text containing this chapter is found in manuscripts such as Washington Manuscript I (5th century CE), and a reduced version of the Septuagint text is found in the illustrated Joshua Roll.

== Analysis ==
The narrative of Israelites conquering the land of Canaan comprises verses 5:13 to 12:24 of the Book of Joshua and has the following outline:

A. Jericho (5:13–6:27)

1. Joshua and the Commander of the Lord's Army (5:13–15)
2. Instructions for Capturing the City (6:1–5)
3. Obeying the Instructions (6:6–21)
4. The Deliverance of Rahab's Family and the City's Destruction (6:22–25)
5. Curse and Renown (6:26–27)

B. Achan and Ai (7:1–8:29)
C. Renewal at Mount Ebal (8:30–35)
D. The Gibeonite Deception (9:1–27)
E. The Campaign in the South (10:1–43)
F. The Campaign in the North and Summary List of Kings (11:1–12:24)

== Instructions for the battle (6:1–5) ==
The account of the attack on Jericho follows the commissioning scene (Joshua 5:13–15) with a note (verse 1) that the people of Jericho were gripped with fear (cf. Joshua 2:24), so the city was 'shut up inside and out'. The instructions in verse 2–5 from God is reported directly, rather than through the commander, beginning as a battle plan but then transforming into an extended act of worship: the men of war were to march around the city once a day for six days, together with priests bearing the Ark of the Covenant and seven priests going ahead of the ark carrying ram's horn trumpets, and then on the seventh day they all to circumambulate Jericho for seven times before the priests blew the trumpets long and all men shout loudly. With the extended blast of trumpet and the great noise of shouting, God promised that the walls of Jericho would fall, allowing the Israelites to get into the city and destroy it. The ark itself represents God's presence in Israel's Holy War (cf. 1 Samuel 4:1-3).

=== Verse 5 ===
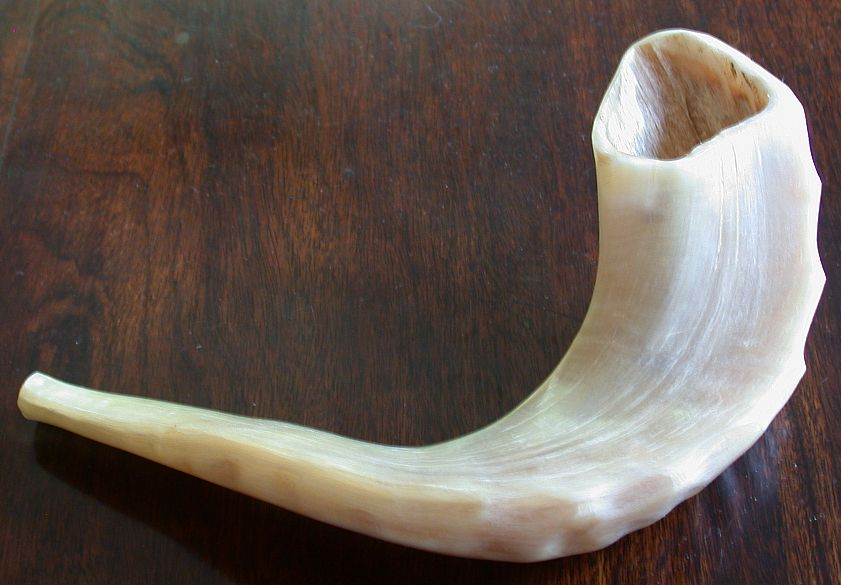
A shofar made from a ram's horn.

[God said to Joshua:] "And when they make a long blast with the ram's horn, when you hear the sound of the trumpet, then all the people shall shout with a great shout, and the wall of the city will fall down flat,[a] and the people shall go up, everyone straight before him."

- "Ram's horn"" from Hebrew: קרן היובל, qe-ren ha-yō-w-ḇêl,, for "shofar" is only used here in the whole Hebrew Bible.

== The Destruction of Jericho (6:6–27) ==
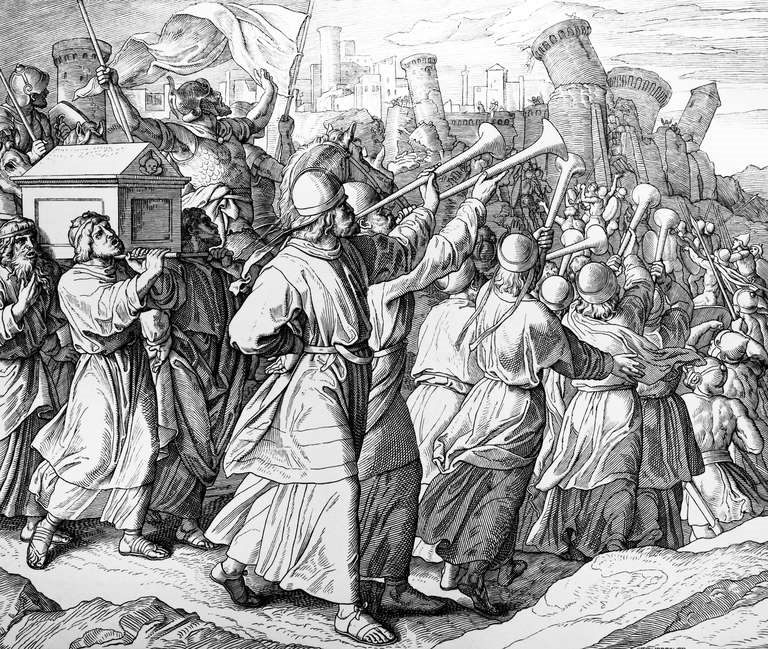
"The Battle of Jericho", by Julius Schnorr von Carolsfeld (1794-1872)

The whole procedure before the actual battle is an act of religious obedience and devotion without military realism to emphasize that in this primary account of Israel's Holy War the victory belong to YHWH. In contrast to the triumphant victories in the Transjordanian Holy War (Deuteronomy 2:26–3:11, especially 2:31), a new significance and solemnity is presented here about the taking of Jericho, as the 'first fruit' of the conquest of the promised land. The prominence of the number seven stands out (seven trumpets, verse 8; days, seven circuits on the seventh day, verses 14–15; cf. verse 4), as also elsewhere in the Hebrew Bible (Genesis 1:1–2:4; 4:24) and in the ancient literature such as those of Ugarit. The theology of the herem, or 'ban', at the centre of the narrative, and of the Holy War, was also known outside Israel (King Mesha of Moab wrote of having laid Israelites under the herem, on the mid-ninth century Moabite Stone), with its implications detailed in verses 17, 21 (cf. Deuteronomy 20:16–18 for the law): all living creatures are to be put to death, and all the city's wealth is to be devoted to God by being placed in the 'treasury of the LORD' (that is, in any sanctuary of YHWH). The battle story contains a clear note about the protection given to Rahab and her family (verses 22–25), according to the commitment made in chapter 2.

=== Verse 26 ===
Then Joshua charged them at that time, saying, "Cursed be the man before the LORD who rises up and builds this city Jericho; he shall lay its foundation with his firstborn, and with his youngest he shall set up its gates."

Joshua's curse of Jericho in this verse will be grimly echoed in 1 Kings 16:34.

== Archaeology ==
The site of ancient Jericho was excavated by:

- Charles Warren (1868) with the British Palestine Exploration Fund.
- Ernst Sellin and Carl Watzinger (1907, 1909, 1911) with the German Oriental Society.
- John Garstang (1930–1936) with the University of Liverpool and the British School of Archaeology in Jerusalem
- Kathleen Kenyon (1952–1958)
- The Italian-Palestinian Expedition (1997–2017) by "La Sapienza" University and Palestinian MOTA-DACH under the direction of Lorenzo Nigro, Nicolò Marchetti, Hamdan Taha, Jehad Yasine etc.

== See also ==
- Ark of the Covenant
- Brass
- Children of Israel
- Curse
- Gold
- Harlot
- Iron
- Jordan River
- Kohen
- Nun
- Promised Land
- Rahab
- Shofar
- Silver
- Related Bible parts: Joshua 2, Joshua 5

== Sources ==
- Coogan, Michael David (2007). Coogan, Michael David; Brettler, Marc Zvi; Newsom, Carol Ann; Perkins, Pheme (eds.). The New Oxford Annotated Bible with the Apocryphal/Deuterocanonical Books: New Revised Standard Version, Issue 48 (Augmented 3rd ed.). Oxford University Press. ISBN 978-0195288810.
- Firth, David G. (2021). Joshua: Evangelical Biblical Theology Commentary. Evangelical Biblical Theology Commentary (EBTC) (illustrated ed.). Lexham Press. ISBN 9781683594406.
- Fitzmyer, Joseph A. (2008). A Guide to the Dead Sea Scrolls and Related Literature. Grand Rapids, MI: William B. Eerdmans Publishing Company. ISBN 9780802862419.
- Halley, Henry H. (1965). Halley's Bible Handbook: an abbreviated Bible commentary (24th (revised) ed.). Zondervan Publishing House. ISBN 0-310-25720-4.
- Hayes, Christine (2015). Introduction to the Bible. Yale University Press. ISBN 978-0300188271.
- McConville, Gordon (2007). "9. Joshua". In Barton, John; Muddiman, John (eds.). The Oxford Bible Commentary (first (paperback) ed.). Oxford University Press. pp. 158–176. ISBN 978-0199277186.
- Rösel, Hartmut N. (2011). Joshua. Historical commentary on the Old Testament. Vol. 6 (illustrated ed.). Peeters. ISBN 978-9042925922.
- Ulrich, Eugene, ed. (2010). The Biblical Qumran Scrolls: Transcriptions and Textual Variants. Brill.
- Würthwein, Ernst (1995). The Text of the Old Testament. Translated by Rhodes, Erroll F. Grand Rapids, MI: Wm. B. Eerdmans. ISBN 0-8028-0788-7.
