= Joshua 2 =

Book of Joshua, chapter 2

- ← chapter 1 chapter 3 →
- The pages containing the Book of Joshua in Leningrad Codex (1008 CE).
- Book: Book of Joshua
- Hebrew Bible part: Nevi'im
- Order in the Hebrew part: 1
- Category: Former Prophets
- Christian Bible part: Old Testament
- Order in the Christian part: 6

Joshua 2 is the second chapter of the Book of Joshua in the Hebrew Bible or in the Old Testament of the Christian Bible. According to Jewish tradition, the book was attributed to Joshua, with additions by the high priests Eleazar and Phinehas, but modern scholars view it as part of the Deuteronomistic History, which spans the books of Deuteronomy to 2 Kings, attributed to nationalistic and devotedly Yahwistic writers during the time of the reformer Judean king Josiah in 7th century BCE. This chapter focuses on the spies sent by Joshua to Jericho and their encounter with Rahab, a part of a section comprising Joshua 1:1–5:12 about the entry to the land of Canaan.

== Text ==
This chapter was originally written in the Hebrew language. It is divided into 24 verses.

=== Textual witnesses ===
Some early manuscripts containing the text of this chapter in Hebrew are of the Masoretic Text tradition, which includes the Codex Cairensis (895), Aleppo Codex (10th century), and Codex Leningradensis (1008). Fragments containing parts of this chapter in Hebrew were found among the Dead Sea Scrolls including XJoshua (XJosh, X1; 50 BCE) with extant verses 4–5. and 4Q48 (4QJosh^{b}; 100–50 BCE) with extant verses 11–12.

Extant ancient manuscripts of a translation into Koine Greek known as the Septuagint (originally was made in the last few centuries BCE) include Codex Vaticanus (B; $\mathfrak{G}$^{B}; 4th century) and Codex Alexandrinus (A; $\mathfrak{G}$^{A}; 5th century). (Note: The whole book of Joshua is missing from the extant Codex Sinaiticus.) Fragments of the Septuagint Greek text containing this chapter is found in manuscripts such as Washington Manuscript I (5th century CE), and a reduced version of the Septuagint text is found in the illustrated Joshua Roll.

=== New Testament references ===
- Joshua 2:1–7: Hebrews 11:30–31

== Analysis ==
The narrative of Israelites entering the land of Canaan comprises verses 1:1 to 5:12 of the Book of Joshua and has the following outline:

A. Preparations for Entering the Land (1:1–18)

1. Directives to Joshua (1:1–9)
2. Directives to the Leaders (1:10–11)
3. Discussions with the Eastern Tribes (1:12–18)

B. Rahab and the Spies in Jericho (2:1–24)

1. Directives to the Spies (2:1a)
2. Deceiving the King of Jericho (2:1b–7)
3. The Oath with Rahab (2:8–21)
4. The Report to Joshua (2:22–24)

C. Crossing the Jordan (3:1–4:24)

1. Initial Preparations for Crossing (3:1–6)
2. Directives for Crossing (3:7–13)
3. A Miraculous Crossing: Part 1 (3:14–17)
4. Twelve-Stone Memorial: Part 1 (4:1–10a)
5. A Miraculous Crossing: Part 2 (4:10b–18)
6. Twelve-Stone Memorial: Part 2 (4:19–24)

D. Circumcision and Passover (5:1–12)

1. Canaanite Fear (5:1)
2. Circumcision (5:2–9)
3. Passover (5:10–12)

== Rahab welcomes the spies (2:1–7) ==
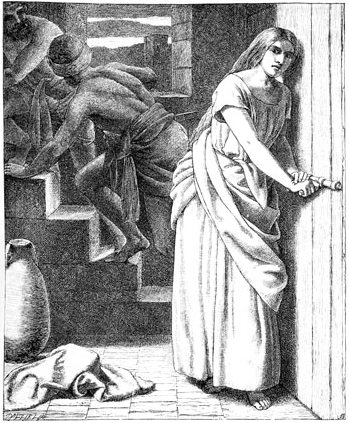
Rahab Receiveth and Concealeth the Spies by Frederick Richard Pickersgill (1881)

The narrative in this chapter seems to be an interruption, but actually provides a background material for the stories of the crossing of the Jordan River and the Battle of Jericho. The sending out of spies follows Moses's example (Numbers 13, Deuteronomy 1:21–23; cf. Joshua 7:2–3), but unlike the earlier mission, which had resulted in failure to take the promised land because of fear (Numbers 13–14), this time the spies encouraged the people to march forward (verse 24; contrast Numbers 13:31–33). Rahab becomes the center of the narrative, being the only named person in the whole story, and practically in control of the whole actions in the narrative: she provides the spies information, protection and advice for their safety, whereas the spies, the king of Jericho and his officers were as passive objects.

=== Verse 1 ===
And Joshua the son of Nun sent out of Shittim two men to spy secretly, saying, Go view the land, even Jericho. And they went, and came into an harlot's house, named Rahab, and lodged there.

- "Shittim": identified as modern "Tell el-Ḥammām", on the eastern bank of Jordan river, opposite Jericho. Here it is written in the same short form as in Numbers 25:1, not in the longer form as in Numbers 33:49.

== The promise to Rahab (2:8–24) ==
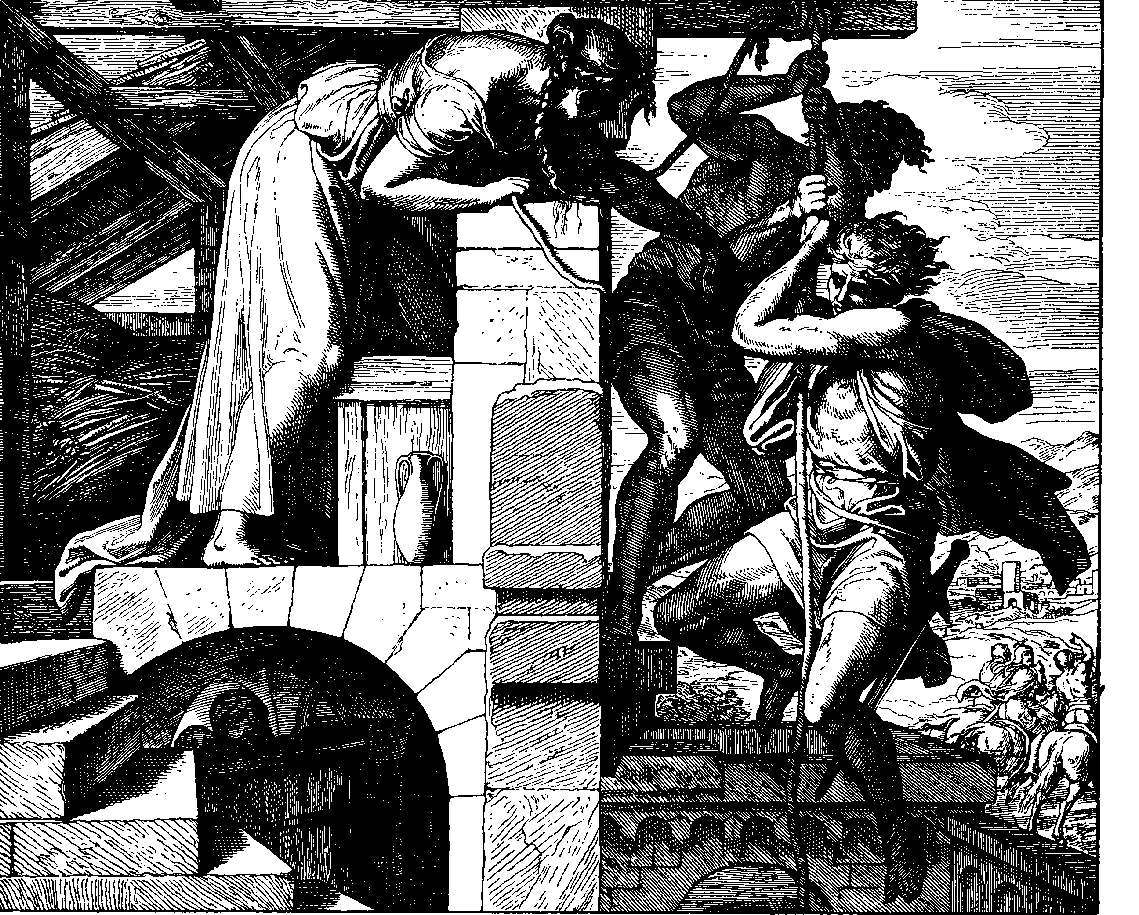
"Rahab lets the spies escape", 1860 woodcut by Julius Schnorr von Karolsfeld

Rahab's confessions of faith (verses 8–11) encouraged the spies of God's promise (cf. Exodus 23:27; Numbers 22:3), as she reminds them of the victories in Transjordan as evidence that they will succeed in Canaan (Deuteronomy 3:21-2), and therefore she demands the life of herself and her family to be 'dealt kindly' (Hebrew: hesed; verse 12) with the expected loyalty in a covenant relationship (cf. 1 Samuel 20:8). The spies agrees, swearing on their own lives to guarantee those of Rahab and family (verse 14,19), provided she does not 'tell this business of ours' (verses 14, 20), in spite of the Holy War concept which demands the killing of every people in Jericho (Deuteronomy 2:32–37; 7:1–5; 20:16–18).

=== Verse 14 ===
And the men said to her, “Our life for yours even to death! If you do not tell this business of ours, then when the LORD gives us the land we will deal kindly and faithfully with you.”

- "Business of ours" refers mainly to the activities of the spies, not the imminent conquest, as the latter is a common knowledge among all Canaanites (verses 9–11).

== See also ==
- Amorites
- Battle of Jericho
- Egypt
- Espionage
- Flax
- Jericho
- Jordan River
- Nun
- Passage of the Red Sea
- Related Bible parts: Joshua 6, Matthew 1, Hebrews 11, James 5

== Sources ==
- Coogan, Michael David (2007). Coogan, Michael David; Brettler, Marc Zvi; Newsom, Carol Ann; Perkins, Pheme (eds.). The New Oxford Annotated Bible with the Apocryphal/Deuterocanonical Books: New Revised Standard Version, Issue 48 (Augmented 3rd ed.). Oxford University Press. ISBN 978-0195288810.
- Firth, David G. (2021). Joshua: Evangelical Biblical Theology Commentary. Evangelical Biblical Theology Commentary (EBTC) (illustrated ed.). Lexham Press. ISBN 9781683594406.
- Fitzmyer, Joseph A. (2008). A Guide to the Dead Sea Scrolls and Related Literature. Grand Rapids, MI: William B. Eerdmans Publishing Company. ISBN 9780802862419.
- Halley, Henry H. (1965). Halley's Bible Handbook: an abbreviated Bible commentary (24th (revised) ed.). Zondervan Publishing House. ISBN 0-310-25720-4.
- Hayes, Christine (2015). Introduction to the Bible. Yale University Press. ISBN 978-0300188271.
- McConville, Gordon (2007). "9. Joshua". In Barton, John; Muddiman, John (eds.). The Oxford Bible Commentary (first (paperback) ed.). Oxford University Press. pp. 158–176. ISBN 978-0199277186.
- Rösel, Hartmut N. (2011). Joshua. Historical commentary on the Old Testament. Vol. 6 (illustrated ed.). Peeters. ISBN 978-9042925922.
- Ulrich, Eugene, ed. (2010). The Biblical Qumran Scrolls: Transcriptions and Textual Variants. Brill.
- Würthwein, Ernst (1995). The Text of the Old Testament. Translated by Rhodes, Erroll F. Grand Rapids, MI: Wm. B. Eerdmans. ISBN 0-8028-0788-7.
