= Joshua 5 =

Book of Joshua, chapter 5

Joshua
- ← chapter 4 chapter 6 →
- The pages containing the Book of Joshua in Leningrad Codex (1008 CE).
- Book: Book of Joshua
- Hebrew Bible part: Nevi'im
- Order in the Hebrew part: 1
- Category: Former Prophets
- Christian Bible part: Old Testament
- Order in the Christian part: 6

Joshua 5 is the fifth chapter of the Book of Joshua in the Hebrew Bible or in the Old Testament of the Christian Bible. According to Jewish tradition, the book was attributed to Joshua, with additions by the high priests Eleazar and Phinehas, but modern scholars view it as part of the Deuteronomistic History, which spans the books of Deuteronomy to 2 Kings, attributed to nationalistic and devotedly Yahwistic writers during the time of the reformer Judean king Josiah in 7th century BCE. This chapter focuses on the circumcision and Passover of the Israelites after crossing the Jordan River under the leadership of Joshua, a part of a section comprising Joshua 1:1–5:12 about the entry to the land of Canaan, and the meeting of Joshua with the Commander of the Lord's army near

== Text ==
This chapter was originally written in the Hebrew language. It is divided into 15 verses.

=== Textual witnesses ===
Some early manuscripts containing the text of this chapter in Hebrew are of the Masoretic Text tradition, which includes the Codex Cairensis (895), Aleppo Codex (10th century), and Codex Leningradensis (1008). Fragments containing parts of this chapter in Hebrew were found among the Dead Sea Scrolls including 4Q47 (4QJosh^{a}; 200–100 BCE) with extant verses 1?, 2–7.

Extant ancient manuscripts of a translation into Koine Greek known as the Septuagint (originally was made in the last few centuries BCE) include Codex Vaticanus (B; $\mathfrak{G}$^{B}; 4th century) and Codex Alexandrinus (A; $\mathfrak{G}$^{A}; 5th century). (Note: The whole book of Joshua is missing from the extant Codex Sinaiticus.) Fragments of the Septuagint Greek text containing this chapter is found in manuscripts such as Washington Manuscript I (5th century CE), and a reduced version of the Septuagint text is found in the illustrated Joshua Roll.

== Analysis ==
The narrative of Israelites entering the land of Canaan comprises verses 1:1 to 5:12 of the Book of Joshua and has the following outline:

A. Preparations for Entering the Land (1:1–18)
B. Rahab and the Spies in Jericho (2:1–24)
C. Crossing the Jordan (3:1–4:24)
D. Circumcision and Passover (5:1–12)

1. Canaanite Fear (5:1)
2. Circumcision (5:2–9)
3. Passover (5:10–12)

The second section of the book contains the narratives of Israelites conquering the land of Canaan comprising verses 5:13 to 12:24 and has the following outline:

A. Jericho (5:13–6:27)

1. Joshua and the Commander of the Lord's Army (5:13–15)
2. Instructions for Capturing the City (6:1–5)
3. Obeying the Instructions (6:6–21)
4. The Deliverance of Rahab's Family and the City's Destruction (6:22–25)
5. Curse and Renown (6:26–27)

B. Achan and Ai (7:1–8:29)
C. Renewal at Mount Ebal (8:30–35)
D. The Gibeonite Deception (9:1–27)
E. The Campaign in the South (10:1–43)
F. The Campaign in the North and Summary List of Kings (11:1–12:24)

== Circumcision of the new generation (5:1–9) ==
The main subject of chapter 5 is "beginning in new land", as the people of Israel finally entered the promised land "flowing with milk and honey" (verse 6), the male population having circumcision, then the timely and correct celebration of the Passover (cf. Exodus 12:43–49), followed by the cessation of Manna (cf. Exodus 16:35). Circumcision was widespread among ancient Semites, but for the people of Israel, it marked the covenantal relationship with God, traced back to Abraham, with a statement that 'no uncircumcised male can be regarded as an Israelite' (Genesis 17:9–14). it is also a condition to be ritually pure to celebrate Passover in the new land, in contrast to God's decree banning the previously circumcised generation from Egypt to step in the land of Canaan (verses 4, 6; cf. Numbers 14:22–23; Deuteronomy 1:34–40). The term 'a second time' shows, that Joshua did not initiate the practice in Israel. With the circumcision, the "disgrace of Egypt" has been 'rolled away' (the verb in Hebrew resembling the name "Gilgal").

=== Verse 1 ===
And it came to pass, when all the kings of the Amorites, which were on the side of Jordan westward, and all the kings of the Canaanites, which were by the sea, heard that the Lord had dried up the waters of Jordan from before the children of Israel, until we were passed over, that their heart melted, neither was there spirit in them any more, because of the children of Israel.

The mention of 'Amorites' and 'Canaanites' for the inhabitants of the land of Canaan follows Deuteronomy 1–3, in which the Amorites are understood as the inhabitants of mountainous parts (Deuteronomy 1:7, 19, 20; Joshua 10:6), whereas the Canaanites are more to the west, toward the Mediterranean Sea, so geographically viewed from the position of the Israelites at this time, the Amorites are mentioned before the Canaanties. Earlier it was recorded how the Israelites' hearts 'melted' because of the Amorites and the sons of Anakim (Deuteronomy 1:27–28), and then rashly took on the enemy unprepared (Deuteronomy 1:41–45), now it is the Amorites and the Canaanites who tremble before the approach of Israel and YHWH.

Verse 5:1 shares the same language pattern as verses 9:1; 10:1 and 11:1, each of which introduces a new part of narrative.

In the Hebrew Masoretic Text, this verse is marked as an 'unconnected unit', bracketed with a parashah setumah ("closed portion marking") before and after.

== First Passover in the land of Canaan (5:10–12) ==
The first Passover in the land of Canaan was held in Gilgal at the correct date as commanded in the Book of Exodus, although here the rituals are not recorded in detail (cf. the Feast of Unleavened Bread that followed Passover for seven days, Leviticus 23:5–6). Rather, this Passover is associated with the ceasing of the Manna (cf. Exodus 16) and the eating of the produce of land. The 'unleavened cakes' recalls the 'unleavened bread' which had been the food of hasty flight from Egypt (Exodus 12:15-20; Deuteronomy 16:3), and eating along with 'parched grain' is consistent with a people not yet settled, but already begun to enjoy the legitimate possession of the land (Deuteronomy 6:10-11).

=== Verse 10 ===
And the children of Israel encamped in Gilgal, and kept the passover on the fourteenth day of the month at even in the plains of Jericho.

- "The fourteenth day of the month": The Passover in the land of Canaan on this exact date on the 41st years of the Israelites' wandering completes the bridge with the Exodus which started with the Passover in Egypt.

== Commander of the Lord's Army (5:13–15) ==
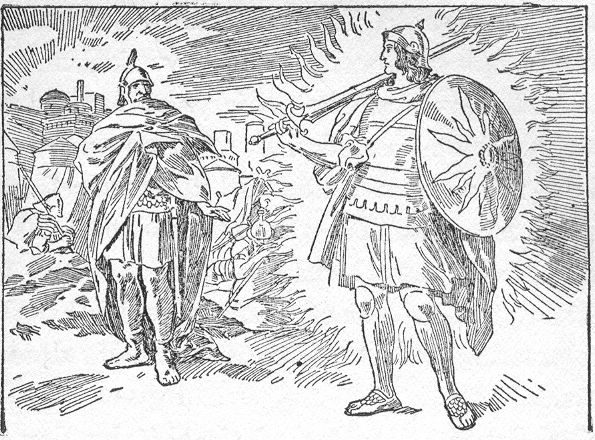
"Joshua sees a man by Jericho" (Joshua 5:13), from "The Boys of the Bible", by Hartwell James, 1905.

The narrative of Joshua's encounter with the 'commander of the army of the LORD' close to Jericho marks the beginning of the war of conquest. Joshua saw and presumed that this man is not an Israelite (hence the question "Are you for us or for our enemies?"). This commander indeed appears to be an 'angel (or messenger) of the LORD', who represents the presence of YHWH himself (cf. Judges 6:14; 13:20–22), sometimes in military function (Numbers 22:23; 2 Samuel 24:16–17; 2 Kings 19:35) or at other times in commissioning, as with Gideon (Judges 6:11–12); both are present here (cf. Moses' encounter with the angel of YHWH in the "burning bush"; Exodus 3:2, 4–6). Joshua evidently realized the angel's military role (verse 13) and the representation of God when he bowed down to worship this figure, experiencing a direct commissioning from God, like that of Moses, at the beginning of the real test of his leadership.

=== Verse 14 ===
And he said, “No; but I am the commander of the army of the Lord. Now I have come.”
And Joshua fell on his face to the earth and worshiped and said to him, “What does my lord say to his servant?”

- "Worshipped": or "paid homage"

The terse response "No" from the commander makes clear that Israel needs to join God's battle instead of God joins them, and indicates that it is possible for Israel in some way not to join God in the battles.

== See also ==
- Amorites
- Canaanites
- Children of Israel
- Christophany
- Circumcision in cultures and religions
- Egypt
- Gilgal
- Jericho
- Jordan River
- Kohen
- Corn
- Manna
- Matzo
- Moses
- Nun
- Passage of the Red Sea
- Passover
- Promised Land
- Theophany
- Tribe of Gad
- Tribe of Manasseh
- Tribe of Reuben
- Tribes of Israel
- Related Bible parts: Exodus 12, Exodus 16, Deuteronomy 1, Joshua 3, Joshua 4. Joshua 6

== Sources ==
- Coogan, Michael David (2007). Coogan, Michael David; Brettler, Marc Zvi; Newsom, Carol Ann; Perkins, Pheme (eds.). The New Oxford Annotated Bible with the Apocryphal/Deuterocanonical Books: New Revised Standard Version, Issue 48 (Augmented 3rd ed.). Oxford University Press. ISBN 978-0195288810.
- Firth, David G. (2021). Joshua: Evangelical Biblical Theology Commentary. Evangelical Biblical Theology Commentary (EBTC) (illustrated ed.). Lexham Press. ISBN 9781683594406.
- Fitzmyer, Joseph A. (2008). A Guide to the Dead Sea Scrolls and Related Literature. Grand Rapids, MI: William B. Eerdmans Publishing Company. ISBN 9780802862419.
- Halley, Henry H. (1965). Halley's Bible Handbook: an abbreviated Bible commentary (24th (revised) ed.). Zondervan Publishing House. ISBN 0-310-25720-4.
- Hayes, Christine (2015). Introduction to the Bible. Yale University Press. ISBN 978-0300188271.
- McConville, Gordon (2007). "9. Joshua". In Barton, John; Muddiman, John (eds.). The Oxford Bible Commentary (first (paperback) ed.). Oxford University Press. pp. 158–176. ISBN 978-0199277186.
- Rösel, Hartmut N. (2011). Joshua. Historical commentary on the Old Testament. Vol. 6 (illustrated ed.). Peeters. ISBN 978-9042925922.
- Ulrich, Eugene, ed. (2010). The Biblical Qumran Scrolls: Transcriptions and Textual Variants. Brill.
- Würthwein, Ernst (1995). The Text of the Old Testament. Translated by Rhodes, Erroll F. Grand Rapids, MI: Wm. B. Eerdmans. ISBN 0-8028-0788-7.
