= Joshua 1 =

Book of Joshua, chapter 1

- ← Deuteronomy 34 chapter 2 →
- The pages containing the Book of Joshua in Leningrad Codex (1008 CE).
- Book: Book of Joshua
- Hebrew Bible part: Nevi'im
- Order in the Hebrew part: 1
- Category: Former Prophets
- Christian Bible part: Old Testament
- Order in the Christian part: 6

Joshua 1 is the first chapter of the Book of Joshua in the Hebrew Bible and in the Old Testament of the Christian Bible. According to Jewish tradition, the book is attributed to Joshua, with additions by the high priests Eleazar and Phinehas, but modern scholars view it as part of the Deuteronomistic history, which spans the Book of Deuteronomy to 2 Kings, attributed to nationalistic and devotedly Yahwistic writers during the time of the reformist Judean king Josiah in 7th century BCE. This chapter focuses on the commission of Joshua as the leader of Israel after the death of Moses, a part of a section comprising Joshua 1:1–5:12 about the entry to Canaan.

== Text ==
This chapter was originally written in the Hebrew language. It is divided into 18 verses.

=== Textual witnesses ===
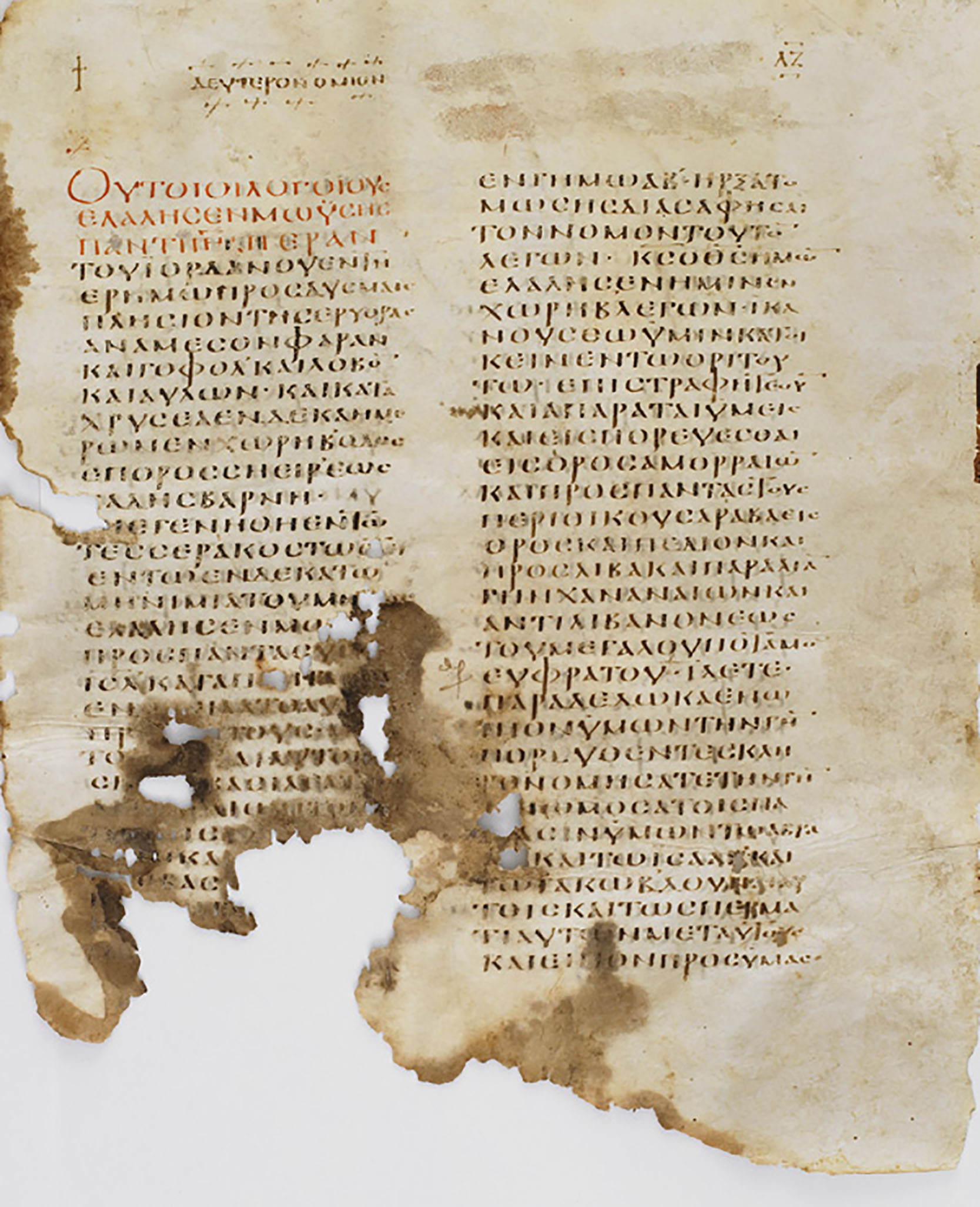
"Washington Manuscript I" (W^{I}), a 5th-century Greek manuscript featuring the end of the Book of Deuteronomy and beginning of the Book of Joshua.

Some early manuscripts containing the text of this chapter in Hebrew are of the Masoretic Text tradition, which includes the Codex Cairensis (895), Aleppo Codex (10th century), and Codex Leningradensis (1008). Fragments containing parts of this chapter in Hebrew were found among the Dead Sea Scrolls including XJoshua (XJosh, X1; 50 BCE) with extant verses 9–12.

Extant ancient manuscripts of a translation into Koine Greek known as the Septuagint (originally was made in the last few centuries BCE) include Codex Vaticanus (B; $\mathfrak{G}$^{B}; 4th century) and Codex Alexandrinus (A; $\mathfrak{G}$^{A}; 5th century). (Note: The whole book of Joshua is missing from the extant Codex Sinaiticus.) Fragments of the Septuagint Greek text containing this chapter is found in manuscripts such as Washington Manuscript I (5th century CE), and a reduced version of the Septuagint text is found in the illustrated Joshua Roll.

=== Old Testament references ===
- Joshua 1:1–9: Deuteronomy 11:8–17

Verse 8 is the first reference to Jewish meditation in the Book of Joshua.

== Analysis ==
The narrative of Israelites entering the land of Canaan comprises verses 1:1 to 5:12 of the Book of Joshua and has the following outline:

A. Preparations for Entering the Land (1:1–18)

1. Directives to Joshua (1:1–9)
2. Directives to the Leaders (1:10–11)
3. Discussions with the Eastern Tribes (1:12–18)

B. Rahab and the Spies in Jericho (2:1–24)

1. Directives to the Spies (2:1a)
2. Deceiving the King of Jericho (2:1b–7)
3. The Oath with Rahab (2:8–21)
4. The Report to Joshua (2:22–24)

C. Crossing the Jordan (3:1–4:24)

1. Initial Preparations for Crossing (3:1–6)
2. Directives for Crossing (3:7–13)
3. A Miraculous Crossing: Part 1 (3:14–17)
4. Twelve-Stone Memorial: Part 1 (4:1–10a)
5. A Miraculous Crossing: Part 2 (4:10b–18)
6. Twelve-Stone Memorial: Part 2 (4:19–24)

D. Circumcision and Passover (5:1–12)

1. Canaanite Fear (5:1)
2. Circumcision (5:2–9)
3. Passover (5:10–12)

== Commissioning of Joshua (1:1–9) ==
This section forms a transition from the narratives of the wilderness wanderings of Israel into the settlement of the land of Canaan, which YHWH has promised to give to his people (verses 3-4; cf Genesis 15:17-21; Exodus 3:17; Deuteronomy 1:7-8), as an overture to the book of Joshua. Moses had led the Israelites since the Exodus from Egypt throughout the time in the wilderness, but he was not to enter the promised land; rather, Joshua would do that, so the commissioning of Joshua in succession to Moses is the focus of this narrative, with a reference to Moses' death linking it to the closing words of the Book of Deuteronomy (the last book of the Torah). The relationship between Moses and Joshua is well documented in Exodus 17:8–16; Numbers 27:12–23, and in the Book of Deuteronomy (1:37–38; 3:21–28; 31:1–23; 34:9). The first speech in this chapter (verses 2–9) contains God's command to Joshua to cross the Jordan River, so the people of Israel could possess their land (verse 6), and a transfer of the privileges and role of Moses to Joshua. The elements in this transfer are

1. the encouragement of Joshua (verses 6, 7, 9)
2. the task to possess the land for the people (verse 6), with the implication of distributing its parts to the tribes (Joshua 13–19)
3. the assurance of God's presence with him (verse 9).

These recall the law of the 'king' (Deuteronomy 17:14–20), which refer to all who would lead in Israel. Joshua's special position is that YHWH's promise of presence is peculiarly his (verse 9), while Joshua place himself under the authority of the law of God given to Moses (verse 7).

=== Verse 1 ===
Now it came about after the death of Moses the servant of the LORD, that the LORD spoke to Joshua the son of Nun, Moses’ servant, saying,

- "Servant of the LORD" ('servant of YHWH'; עבד יהוה, ‘e-ḇeḏ Yah-weh): a phrase that marks both relationship and responsibility, also used elsewhere of Moses (Exodus 14:31; Deuteronomy 34:5), and of King David (2 Samuel 7:5).
- "Moses' servant": from Hebrew: משרת משה, mə-šā-rêṯ mō-šeh, "minister" or "assistant" of Moses, "the one who serves Moses". This was Joshua's continuous title in the Torah (Exodus 24:13; 33:11; Numbers 11:28), an important role especially as it is associated with present of God's Spirit in him, a key reason for his designation as Moses' successor (later also confirmed by Moses' laying hand on Joshua; Deuteronomy 34:9). From a 'second to Moses', Joshua's commissioning puts him in Moses' place, which is explicitly restated in verse 5 (cf. Exodus 3:12 for Moses). By the end of his life, Joshua was finally called "the servant of the LORD" ("servant of YHWH"; Joshua 24:29).

=== Verse 2 ===
"Moses My servant is dead; now therefore arise, cross this Jordan, you and all this people, to the land which I am giving to them, to the sons of Israel."

- The death of Moses (Deuteronomy 34) provides the basis for Joshua's commission. God had not allowed Moses to enter the land (Deuteronomy 32:48–52).

== Joshua assumes command (1:10–18) ==
In verses 10–11 Joshua gave his first command to the 'officers of the people' (presupposed in Exodus 5:10-19; commissioned in Numbers 1:16, Deuteronomy 1:15.) to prepare each tribe for the coming military campaign (Deuteronomy 11:31). Verses 12–15 record Joshua's speech to the 'Transjordanian tribes' — the tribes of Reuben, Gad and the half-tribe of Manasseh who had set their territories east of the Jordan river (cf. Numbers 32; Deuteronomy 3:12-21) — that they should send their men to fight with other tribes to conquer the land west of Jordan and only return after the conquest is considered complete. The topic is addressed again in Joshua 22, thus bracketing the main parts of the book. The reply of these tribes in verses 16–18 echoes God's assurance in verses 1–9 and brings conclusion to this chapter.

=== Verse 15 ===
"until the LORD gives rest to your brothers as he has to you, and they also take possession of the land that the LORD your God is giving them. Then you shall return to the land of your possession and shall possess it, the land that Moses the servant of the LORD gave you beyond the Jordan toward the sunrise."

- "Rest" is the key theological idea for the goal of the conquest (also in verse 12; cf. Deuteronomy 12:9), 'entailing the complete possession of the land and the subduing of enemies' (Joshua 11:23).

== See also ==
- 613 Mitzvot
- Capital punishment
- Children of Israel
- Euphrates
- Hittites
- Jordan River
- Lebanon
- Meditation
- Mediterranean Sea
- Nun
- Promised Land
- Related Bible parts: Deuteronomy 11, Deuteronomy 34
- Tribe of Gad
- Tribe of Manasseh
- Tribe of Reuben

== General and cited references ==
- Coogan, Michael David (2007). Coogan, Michael David; Brettler, Marc Zvi; Newsom, Carol Ann; Perkins, Pheme (eds.). The New Oxford Annotated Bible with the Apocryphal/Deuterocanonical Books: New Revised Standard Version, Issue 48 (Augmented 3rd ed.). Oxford University Press. ISBN 978-0195288810.
- Firth, David G. (2021). Joshua: Evangelical Biblical Theology Commentary. Evangelical Biblical Theology Commentary (EBTC) (illustrated ed.). Lexham Press. ISBN 9781683594406.
- Fitzmyer, Joseph A. (2008). A Guide to the Dead Sea Scrolls and Related Literature. Grand Rapids, MI: William B. Eerdmans Publishing Company. ISBN 9780802862419.
- Halley, Henry H. (1965). Halley's Bible Handbook: an abbreviated Bible commentary (24th (revised) ed.). Zondervan Publishing House. ISBN 0-310-25720-4.
- Hayes, Christine (2015). Introduction to the Bible. Yale University Press. ISBN 978-0300188271.
- McConville, Gordon (2007). "9. Joshua". In Barton, John; Muddiman, John (eds.). The Oxford Bible Commentary (first (paperback) ed.). Oxford University Press. pp. 158–176. ISBN 978-0199277186.
- Rösel, Hartmut N. (2011). Joshua. Historical commentary on the Old Testament. Vol. 6 (illustrated ed.). Peeters. ISBN 978-9042925922.
- Ulrich, Eugene, ed. (2010). The Biblical Qumran Scrolls: Transcriptions and Textual Variants. Brill.
- Würthwein, Ernst (1995). The Text of the Old Testament. Translated by Rhodes, Erroll F. Grand Rapids, MI: Wm. B. Eerdmans. ISBN 0-8028-0788-7.
