= Althea Gyles =

Artist and poet (1867–1949)

- Althea Gyles, Jan 16, 1898
- Born: Margaret Alethea Gyles; January 1867; Bath, Somerset, England
- Died: 23 January 1949 (aged 80–81); Beckenham, London
- Known for: book design and poetry

Althea Gyles (January 1867 – 23 January 1949) was an Irish poet and artist. She is known for her book cover designs, for writers who included W. B. Yeats.

== Early life ==
Margaret Alithea Gyles was born in Bath, Somerset, and christened there at Walcot on 5 February 1867. She had two older sisters, Lena Louisa and Maud Mary, both also born in Bath.

Her family home was Kilmurry, County Waterford. George Gyles, her father, was from a prominent Anglo-Irish family, which according to W. B. Yeats was "so haughty that their neighbours called them the Royal Family." Her mother, Alithea Emma Gyles, was the daughter of a Bishop of Hereford, Edward Grey, and a niece of Charles Grey, 1st Earl Grey. The family moved to Dublin in 1889. Gyles severed ties with her family and reportedly supported herself by selling a watch and writing stories for an Irish paper. At this time, she attended an art school on St Stephen's Green. Due to her poor living conditions and poverty, E. J. Dick invited her to live in "the household", a theosophical commune at 3, Ely Place. Others living there at the time were Dick's wife and George William Russell. When W. B. Yeats joined the household in 1891, he described Gyles as "a strange red-haired girl, all whose thoughts were set upon painting and poetry." Gyles fought with the Dicks, returning to "starvation and misery [which] had a large share in her ritual of worship". While living at 53, Mountpleasant Square, she wrote an unpublished novel, The Woman without a Soul, the plot of which focuses on a black magician.

== Career ==
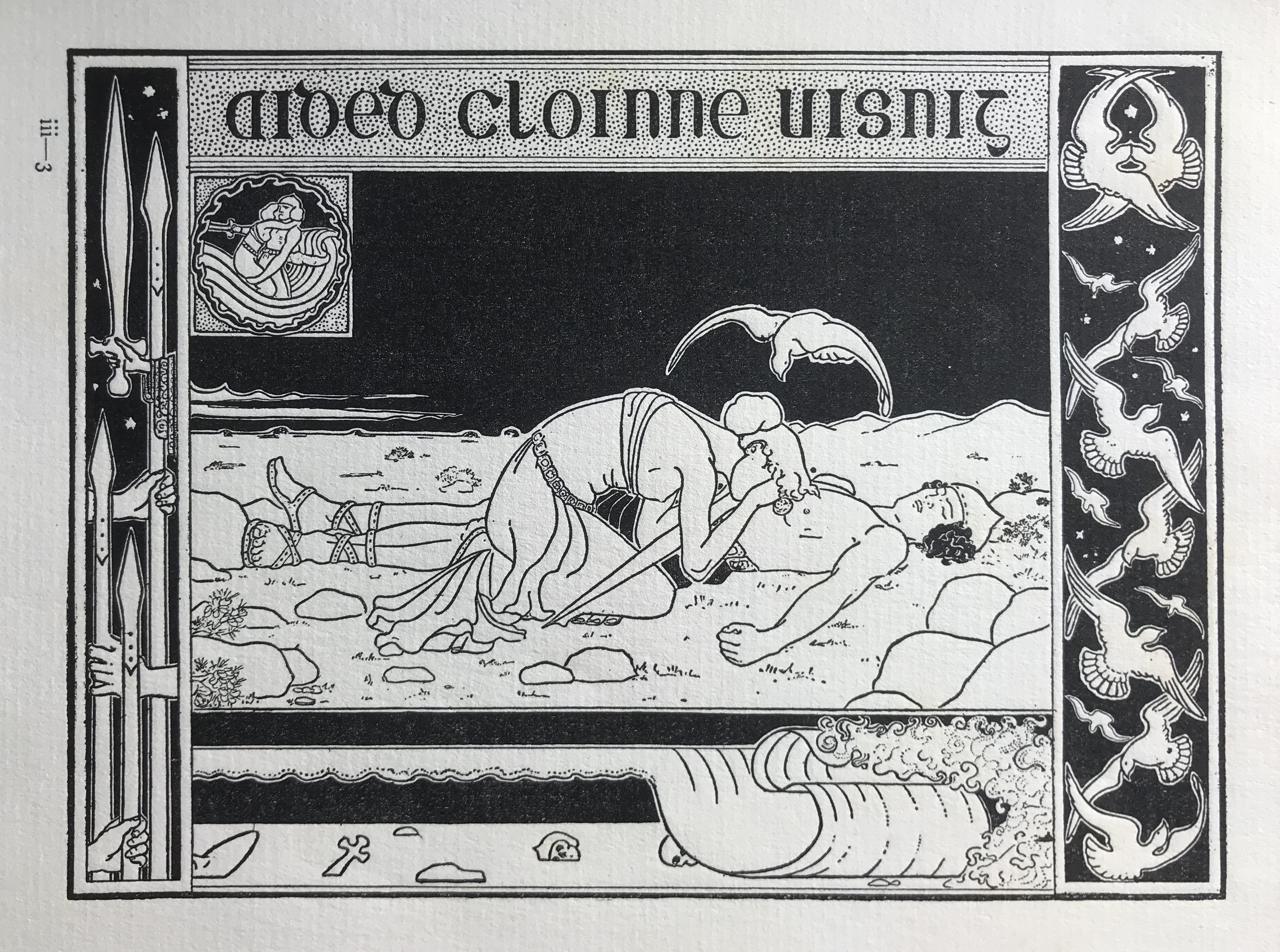
The Violent Death of the Children of Uisnigh, in The Dome, 1897

Gyles left Dublin for London in 1892, where she resumed studying art, firstly at Pedders, and then from 1893 at the Slade School of Fine Art. While in London she mixed with writers, including Oscar Wilde, who rated her work highly. By 1896, Gyles had established a studio at 86, Charlotte Street, Fitzroy Square, and was a friend of the art critic Gertrude Elizabeth Blood and the artist Mabel Dearmer. Gyles's poem Dew-time was published in the Pall Mall Magazine in October 1894. She also illustrated the poem, which was influenced by George Russell. In June 1896, her drawing The Offering of Pan appeared in The Commonweal, and in 1897 she illustrated T. W. Rolleston's Deirdre: the Feis Ceoil Prize Cantata. Around this time she and Yeats became interested in the Hermetic Order of the Golden Dawn, the cabbalistic iconography of which influenced her design of the cover of Yeats's book The Secret Rose (1897). She also designed the cover of his Poems (1899) and The Wind among the Reeds (1899) and created a cover design for Matthew Russell's The Idylls of Killowen (1898).

Yeats wrote of Gyles

Miss Althea Gyles may come to be one of the most important of the little group of Irish poets who seek to express indirectly through myths and symbols, or directly in little lyrics full of prayers and lamentations, the desire of the soul for spiritual beauty and happiness. She has done, besides the lyric I quote, which is charming in form and substance, a small number of poems full of original symbolism and spiritual ardour, though as yet lacking in rhythmical subtlety. Her drawings and book covers, in which precise symbolism never interferes with the beauty of design, are as yet her most satisfactory expression of herself.

Both Yeats and Gyles were acquaintances of Aleister Crowley, with whom Gyles had a romantic affair. Their experiences with magic and astral vision are chronicled by Crowley as his fictional characters, with Crowley as Count Swanoff, Gyles as Hypatia Gay, and Yeats as Will Bute. In 1899, Gyles illustrated Wilde's The Harlot's House, which was published by Leonard Smithers. Gyles became involved with Smithers, which eventually caused Yeats to distance himself from her. Later in 1899, she designed the covers for Ernest Dowson's Decorations, which featured a stylised rose that Yeats described as her "central symbol." For the top board of The Night (1900), by John White-Rodyng, she pictured four swirling birds pecking at a heart between a sun and a moon, with stars. By mid-September 1900, Arthur Symons discovered her in an empty room at 15, Granby Place, Hampstead Road, "without a thing in the place, except five books (one a presentation copy from Oscar Wilde) and one or two fantastic gold ornaments which she used to wear; chloral by her side, and the bed strewn with MSS." Gyles had left her library with Yeats, to save it from the bailiffs. Symons sold Gyles's poem For a Sepulchre to the Saturday Review. She was recovering in the Royal Hospital for Diseases of the Chest, in the City Road, when Smithers went bankrupt. In November 1900 she offered Smithers £6 towards Wilde's funeral, which he refused.

At the time of the 1901 United Kingdom census, Gyles was a visitor in the household of Helen Croker in Bournemouth and described herself as “Artist Sculptor”, single, aged 34.

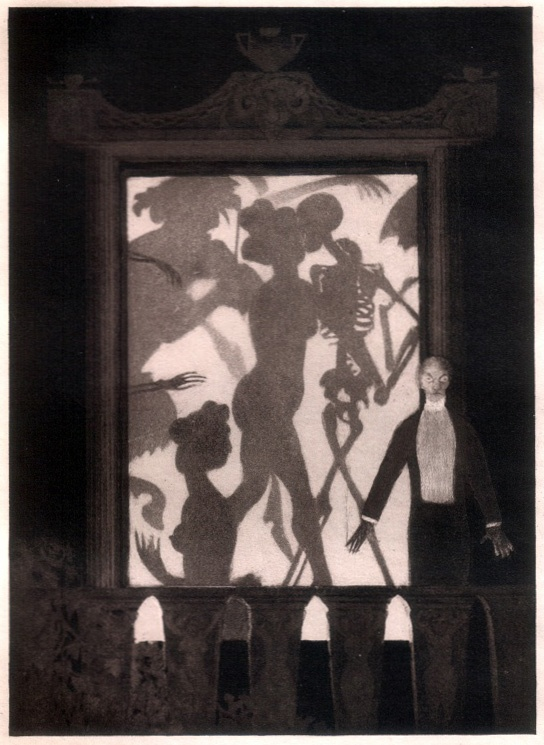
An illustration by Gyles from The Harlot's House (1904)

Symons described Smithers as "a drunken brute whom no one could stand", who had "left her as soon as he had alienated her other friends." The breakdown of Smithers and Gyles's relationship led to a collapse in her health, from which she never recovered completely, and her work as a productive designer was effectively over. Her only surviving work is the rejected frontispiece for Yeats's The Wind Among the Reeds, which in the event was re-used for The Shadowy Waters (1900), and is held in the British Library. The spine design for The Secret Rose was reused in the 1902 edition, but it is unknown whether Gyles was involved in this redesign. In 1903, her front and rear cover designs for The Wind Among the Reeds were redrawn, but it is unlikely she redrew them. Subsequently, Yeats refused a number of her book spine designs.

Gyles published verse occasionally in the Saturday Review, the Candid Friend, The Kensington, The Venture, The Academy, Orpheus, and The Vineyard. Her financial difficulties continued, and she refused help from her family. Gyles's friend Cecil French described her as "a noble difficult being who invariably became the despair of those who had helped her." Although she had compiled a volume of her verse, it remained a transcript, due to her inability to proof it, with her claiming "the effort would kill her; nor was anyone else allowed to correct the proofs." The transcripts are held in Arthur Henry Bullen's archive. Compton and Faith Mackenzie visited her at her home in Paradise Walk, Chelsea, describing her living conditions as having "an atmosphere of squalid poverty", leading to the couple inviting her to Cornwall in May 1908.

In 1908, Gyles was living at 2 Oakley Crescent, Chelsea, with Francis John Stamford and Minnie Brook.

One of Gyles's unfinished projects was an alphabet she was designing, The alphabet of the wonderful wood, around 1906. Eleanor Farjeon described her as "quite exquisitely gifted, as a writer and an artist; with the sort of temperament that stood in her own light", but added that she was "fascinating and exhausting." In 1914 she published Letters to Children about Drawing, Painting, and Something More, using the name "John Meade".

== Later life ==
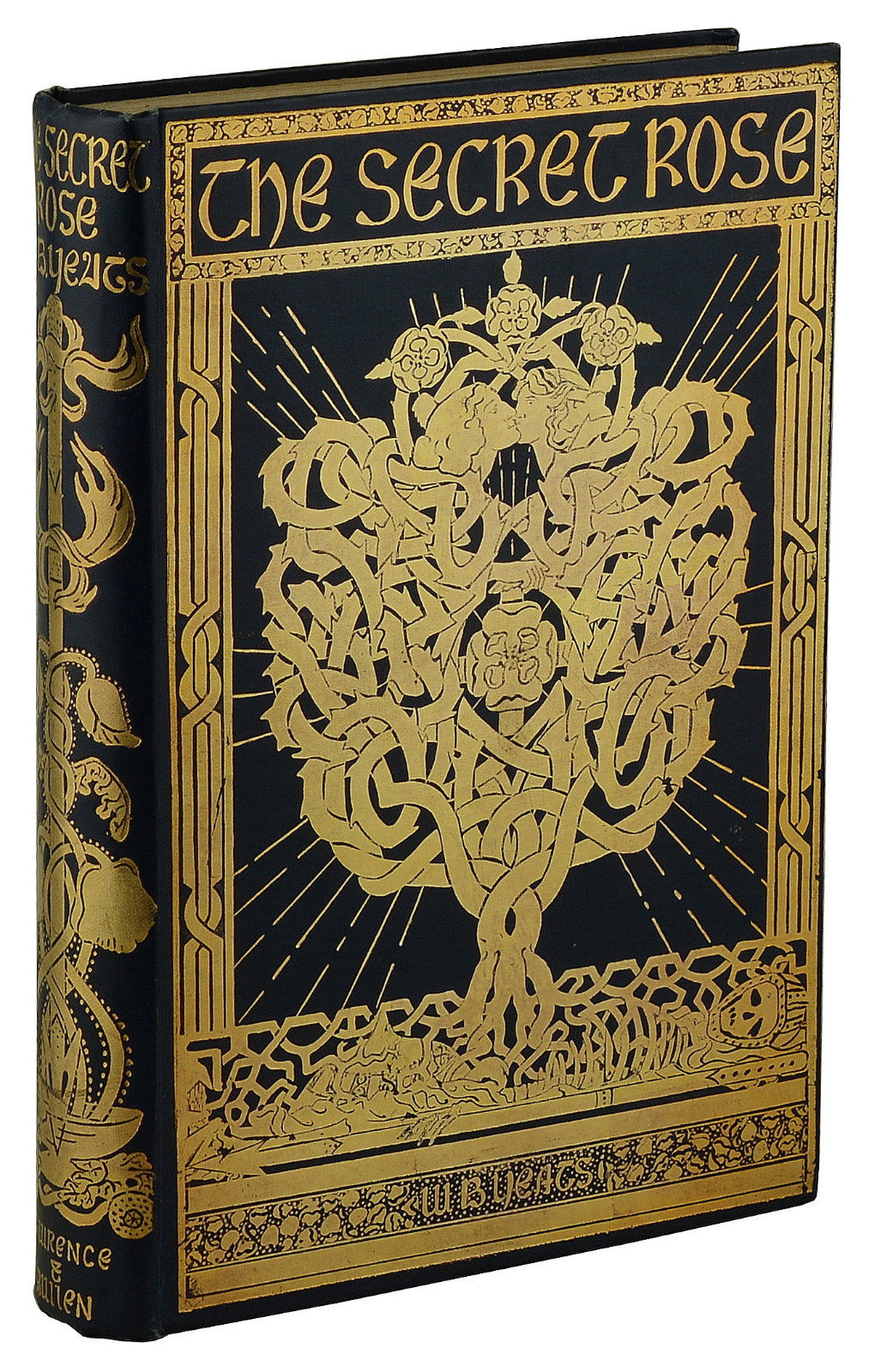
The Secret Rose, 1897, cover by Althea Gyles

Although Gyles continued to work, at writing and painting, she also drifted and had poor health. She gravitated towards a variety of movements and interests, which included horoscope writing, Buddhism, anti-vivisection, and vegetarianism, while being supported by dissatisfied patrons such as Clifford Bax, who considered her a parasite. The publisher Grant Richards encouraged her to write her memoirs of the 1890s. As a result, she wrote a novel, Pilgrimage, which Richards rejected in February 1921, although he continued to request a memoir until early 1924. She wrote to Farjeon in the 1930s, while living in awful conditions in a Brixton basement, with a big mongrel dog. The last address recorded for her was 19, Tredown Road, Lewisham, at which time her room was empty except for a chaise longue, a few items of bric-à-brac, and her manuscripts. Gyles died in a nursing home at 69, Crystal Palace Park Road, Beckenham, Kent, on 23 January 1949.

In Faith Compton Mackenzie's novel Tatting (1957), a character called Ariadne Berden is based on Gyles.

Photographs of Gyles with Constance Markievicz were discovered in 2007. Her manuscripts are now in the collections of the University of Reading.
