= Leo Bible =

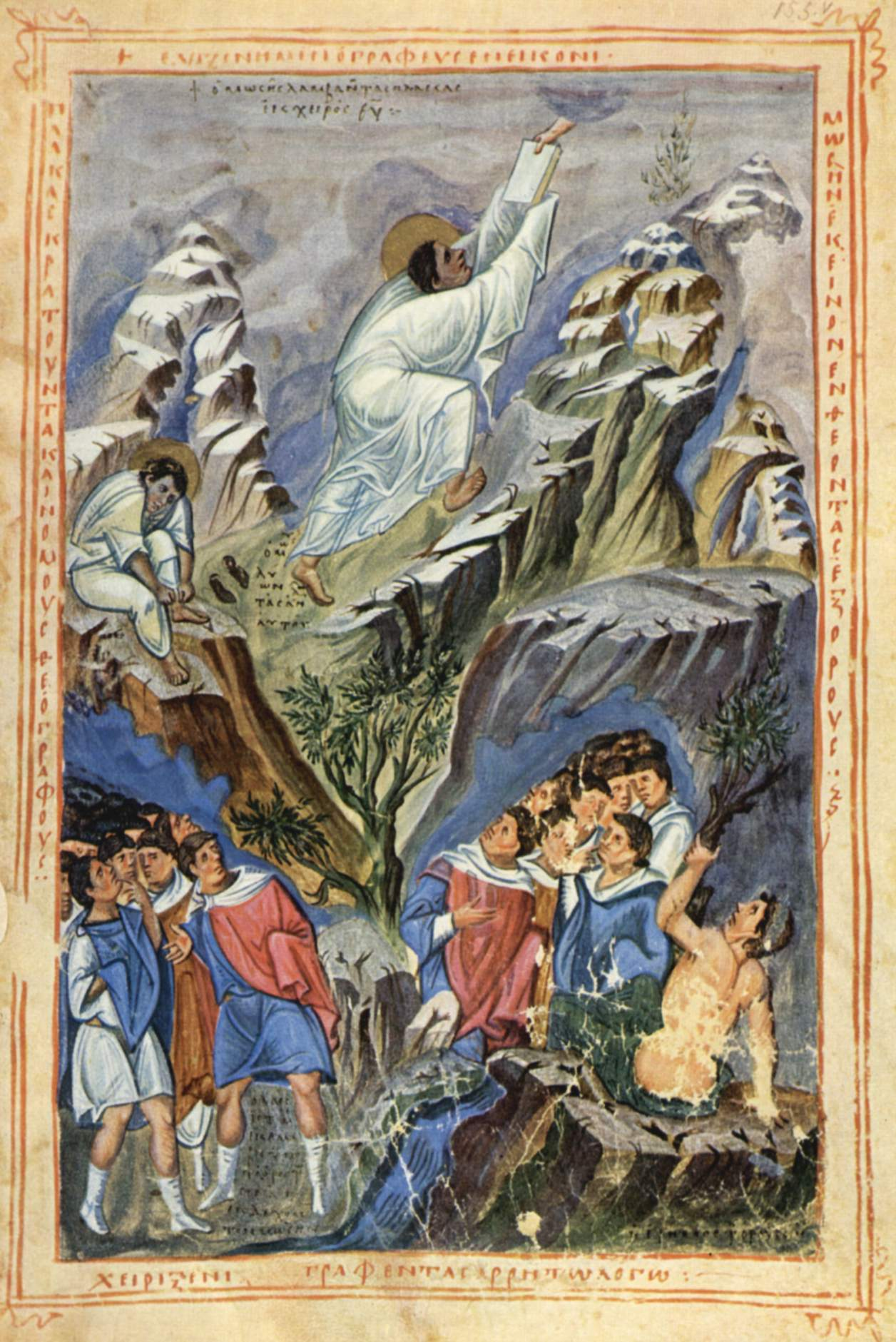
Leo Bible, scene: Moses receives the tablets of the law on Mount Sinai, BAV Reg. gr. 1, Fol. 155v

The Leo Bible (Rome, Vatican, Bib. Apostolica, MS. Reg. gr. 1) is a Byzantine illuminated manuscript dated to the mid 10th century, making it one of the earliest surviving Byzantine Bibles. Though only one volume survives, a preface and an intact contents page tell us that the Bible originally contained both the Hebrew Bible and the New Testament. Due to its association with the Macedonian Renaissance it is often grouped along with the stylistically similar Paris Psalter and Joshua Roll. A prefatory poem indicates that the volume was commissioned by one Leo Patrikios, and so it is also known as the Bible of Leo the Patrician (Bibel des Patricius Leo).

The manuscript is in the collection of the Vatican Library

== Appearance ==
The size of the Bible (410mm-270mm) is unusually large. It contains books Genesis through Psalms prefaced by 18 full-page miniatures rendered in a colorful, ‘painterly’ fashion that were inserted on separate leaves, suggesting that they were perhaps added after the initial completion of the text. The miniatures are rendered largely in figural and architectural forms that reflect the Macedonian Renaissance’s interest in classicism. However, the visual content as well as the verse inscriptions, presumed to be written by Leo, often eschew traditional Biblical narratives and tend to place a large emphasis on Moses, as well as offer uncommon iconography such as images of Judith and Holofernes. Recent scholarship suggests that the inscriptions were intended to be read as exegesis.

== Patronage and dating ==
In addition to its Biblical illuminations, the Leo Bible offers two ‘dedication’ images that offer clues as to nature of its commission. One image represents a long haired, beardless man presenting the book to the Virgin Mary, who then refers it to Christ. An inscription identifies the man as, “Leo, patritian, praepositus, sakellarios,” referring to his position as an imperial treasurer (or sakellarios). It is presumed from his appearance in the miniature that Leo was a eunuch, a status historically compatible with this profession.

The second image depicts St. Nicholas with two figures kneeling at his feet, identified in the inscription as Constantine the protospatharios, Leo’s brother and founder of the St. Nicholas monastery to which the volume was donated, and Makar, the abbot of the monastery. These allusions to the Bible’s creation are reinforced by the inscription accompanying Leo's dedication miniature, which states that Leo offered the book to the St. Nicholas monastery, “in remission for [his] sins."

Though originally attributed to the exegete Leo Magistros, Byzantinist Cyril Mango reasons that due to his lack of ever holding of the sakellarios position in addition to being married with children and therefore not being a eunuch, Magistros cannot be the Leo in question. Mango suggests instead that the donor is the same Leo sakellarios that appears as the addressee of a series of surviving Byzantine letters dating from 925 to 944, now kept in the British Museum. Mango asserts that evidence found within the letters suggests that the Bible was made around 940, a claim which has largely been accepted in Byzantinist scholarship.
