= The Sphinx (poem) =

Poem by Oscar Wilde

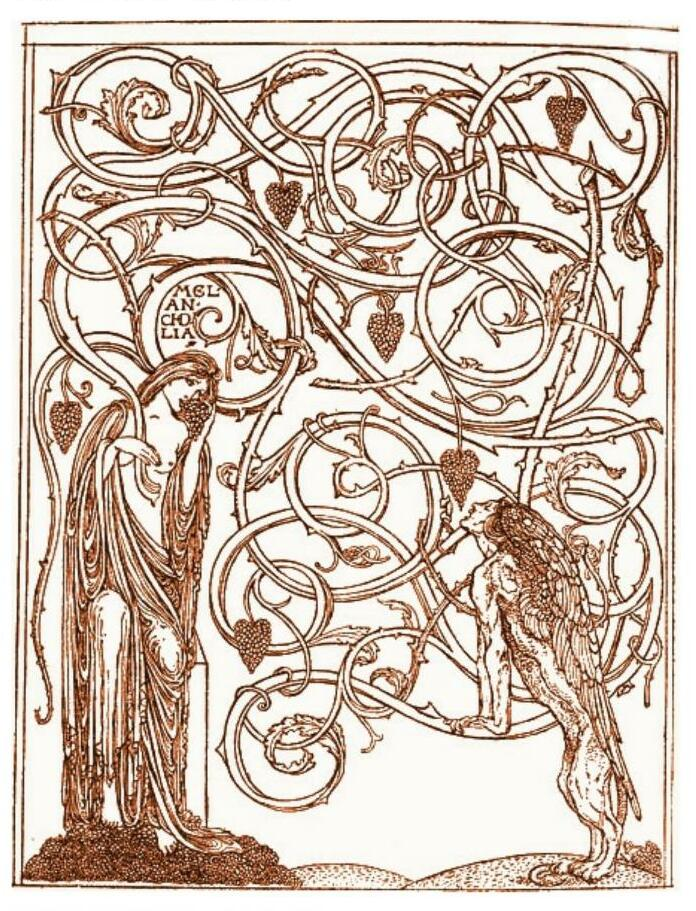
The title-page of the first edition of The Sphinx, with decorations by Charles Ricketts

The Sphinx is a 174-line poem by Oscar Wilde, written from the point of view of a young man who questions the Sphinx in lurid detail on the history of her sexual adventures, before finally renouncing her attractions and turning to his crucifix. It was written over a period of twenty years, stretching from Wilde's years as an Oxford student up to the poem's publication in an édition de luxe in 1894. The Sphinx drew on a wide range of sources, both ancient and modern, but particularly on various works of the French Decadent movement. Though at first coldly received by critics it is now generally recognized as Wilde's finest Decadent poem, and has been described as "unrivalled: a quintessential piece of fin-de-siècle art".

== Synopsis ==
The poem begins with the narrator describing the figure of a sphinx which stands "in a dim corner of my room". He then addresses her, "Come forth you exquisite grotesque! half woman and half animal!", and asks to stroke her. He contrasts her immense antiquity with his own "twenty summers", and begins to enumerate scenes of Classical history and Egyptian mythology, asking her if she witnessed them. He next turns to the question "Who were your lovers? who were they who wrestled for you in the dust?" He suggests various Egyptian animals, mythical beasts, men, women and gods, before announcing "Nay, I know / Great Ammon was your bedfellow!" He details the beginning of their sexual liaison, and describes Ammon's personal beauty and splendour, before reflecting that that splendour has all come to ruin. He bids the sphinx return to Egypt to find and honour Ammon's remains; yet Ammon is not dead, and neither are any of her other divine lovers. In Egypt she could resume any of her former passions with god or beast. The narrator dismisses her with disgust both for her and for himself: "You make my creed a barren sham, you wake foul dreams of sensual life". Finally, he asks to be left to his crucifix with its figure of Christ, who "weeps for every soul who dies, and weeps for every soul in vain".

== Composition ==
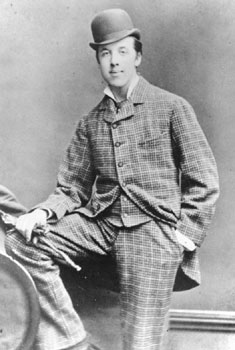
Oscar Wilde in his student years, when he began writing The Sphinx

The writing of The Sphinx was a long and complicated process, lasting almost twenty years and producing eleven surviving groups of manuscripts. Wilde began working on it in 1874, the year he went up to Oxford, possibly in the summer of that year when he was on holiday in Paris with his parents. In 1883, again in Paris, he returned to the poem and produced a version which included thirteen stanzas not found in the published poem. By the 1890s Wilde, needing money and wanting to present himself as something more than a fiction-writer and journalist, brought his poem into its final form, ready for publication.

== Publication ==
The Sphinx was published on 11 June 1894 by Elkin Mathews and John Lane in an edition of just 200 copies along with a large-paper edition limited to 25 copies. It was printed in black, green, and red, and boasted illustrations by Charles Ricketts, who also designed the vellum and gold binding. It has been described as "the most exquisite of all Wilde's first editions...so beautiful that, read in any other format, it seems to lose half of its power". Wilde dedicated the book to his friend Marcel Schwob, and remarked that "My first idea was to print only three copies: one for myself, one for the British Museum, and one for Heaven. I had some doubts about the British Museum."

== Verse form ==
The Sphinx was originally written in the four-line stanza, rhyming ABBA, used by Tennyson in his In Memoriam and by Wilde himself in very many of his poems. Later, by eliminating half of the line-breaks, he reduced the four eight-syllable lines of each stanza to two sixteen-syllable lines, thereby turning end rhymes into internal rhymes. In this form, as finally published, it is 174 lines in length.

== Sources ==
The prime influence on The Sphinx was the French Decadent movement, particularly Huysmans' À rebours, the cat sonnets in Baudelaire's Les Fleurs du mal, and the poems of Maurice Rollinat. In particular, the poem's fascination with monsters, statues, and ambiguous sexuality draws on Flaubert's Tentation de Saint Antoine and on Gautier's Mademoiselle de Maupin and Émaux et camées; Flaubert also provided Wilde with much of his exotic vocabulary. Other important influences include Swinburne's "Dolores", with its "imputation of ageless profligacy"; Rossetti's "The Burden of Nineveh", itself inspired by the British Museum's acquisition of a sculptured god from Nineveh; and Shelley's "Ozymandias", recalling Wilde's "giant granite hand still clenched in impotent despair". The ending of Wilde's poem, in which the sphinx is seen as an evil presence and dismissed, echoes the ending of Poe's "The Raven", which may also have suggested some of The Sphinx's complex prosodic features. Wilde's "snake-tressed Fury" may be taken from Dante's Inferno. He did not make use of Egyptological scholarship, preferring, as a classicist, to take his view of Egypt from writers like Herodotus and Tacitus. Several books of the Bible provided Wilde with details, including Exodus, 2 Kings, Job, and Matthew.

The influence on The Sphinx of various art objects has also been traced. One example is Gustave Moreau's painting Oedipus and the Sphinx, in which, as described by Giles Whiteley, "the Sphinx is grasping onto the half naked body of Oedipus and gazing coquettishly into his eyes, repeating physically the coupling of Hermaphroditus and Salmacis". Wilde's lines

Sing to me of the Jewish maid who wandered with the Holy Child,
And how you led them through the wild, and how they slept beneath your shade.

suggest Luc-Olivier Merson's painting "Repose on the Flight into Egypt", with its depiction of the Virgin and Child resting between the Sphinx's paws. It is also clear that Wilde had seen the British Museum's collection of Egyptian antiquities and recalled them to mind while writing his poem.

== Criticism ==
Contemporary reviews of The Sphinx were few and, on the whole, unenthusiastic, criticizing its sensationalism and artificiality. W. E. Henley, writing in The Pall Mall Gazette, vented his dislike of the Decadent movement in a particularly contemptuous notice. The Athenaeum found the poem's "lewd imaginings" and "reckless riot of self-indulgence" distasteful, but conceded its ingenuity and technical proficiency. The Pall Mall Budget praised Ricketts' illustrations, and characterized the poem itself as "weird, sometimes repulsive, but all the same stately and impressive". The disappointing reception of The Sphinx provoked George Bernard Shaw to write to one reviewer, "The critic's first duty is to admit, with absolute respect, the right of every man to his own style. Wilde's wit and his fine literary workmanship are points of great value."

In the years after Wilde's death the poem's merits were reconsidered. In 1907 Guy Thorne wrote that "In the realm of the fantastic, it has no equal...It has all the fantastic unreality of Chinese dragons, and therefore can in no way be harmful...Whilst we are alternately fascinated and repelled by the subject, we are lost in admiration of the decorative treatment of the theme". An anonymous writer in The Academy in 1909 considered it "perhaps Wilde's most complete and satisfactory poetical work, for here he was hampered neither by the insincerity which sacrifices everything to style on the one hand, nor, on the other hand, by the crude brutality of real and horrible life breaking like a violent unresolved discord into the harmony of his delicate yet stately music." In the same year The Globe declared it "among the most remarkable works ever penned by human hand...If such lines have not the haunting, magical touch of the true poet, we know not where to look for it in all English literature."

One dissenting opinion came from Arthur Symons, who wrote that The Sphinx "offers no subtlety, no heat of an Egyptian desert, no thrill in anything but the words and cadences...[It] can delude the mind through the ears to listen, when the lines are read out, to a flow of loud and bright words which are as meaningless as the monotonous Eastern music of drum and gong is to the Western ear." In 1946 Wilde's biographer Hesketh Pearson took a similar view: "No doubt The Sphinx could pass as poetry in an age that had forgotten how to write it and mistook word-patterns for the real thing...This kind of thing has about it the interest of the cross-word puzzle, for those who find cross-word puzzles interesting, and the reader is kept wondering what quaint word the author will come across when next he dips into the dictionary." This criticism of the poem is still made, with Tully Atkinson in 2003 noting that much of The Sphinx is "nonsense poetry of the purest verbal music of rhythm and rhyme...just humorous wordplay of phantasmagoria", while Isobel Murray has remarked that some phrases "defy explanation, because they evolved accidentally in composition".

The title-character of The Sphinx, like the title-character of Wilde's Salome, has been seen as a femme fatale, the murderess of those she desires, even a necrophiliac, who is finally defeated by the ascetic Christianity of the man she has tried to fascinate. Both can be seen as morbid sexual fantasies, of which the object is even more androgynous and demonic in the case of the Sphinx.

The poem's ending, in which the narrator becomes disgusted with the Sphinx and turns to his crucifix, has been seen as problematic. Some critics, such as Ruth Robbins and Wilde's editor Anne Varty, have suspected him of a "confusion of religious sentiment with secular sensuality" in his invocation of Christ on the Cross. Another common criticism was first made by one of the original reviewers of the poem, who asserted that "Mr. Wilde's crucifix is no less an artistic property than his nenuphars and monoliths"; likewise Anne Varty thought that the dismissal of the Sphinx comes too late to carry conviction, and the critic Norbert Kohl suggested that Wilde had "taken fright at his own daring and...run back at the last moment to the safety of Victorian moral convention". The final line, which asserts that Christ "weeps for every soul that dies, and weeps for every soul in vain", shows that the narrator, even in his rejection of Classical paganism, still has doubts about the doctrine of the Atonement. Tully Atkinson sees in this a portrayal of the compromised religious faith of the proto-Modern man, which "while imperfect in him, offers a sublimity greater than himself and the world".

== Legacy ==
The composer Henry C. ff. Castleman's False Sphinx, published as one of his Two Songs (1913), is a setting of the last two stanzas of The Sphinx. In 1925 the Soviet composer Alexander Mosolov set a Russian translation of the poem, under the title Sfinks, as a cantata for tenor, choir and orchestra. It was his diploma work as a student at the Moscow Conservatory, and is now lost. Granville Bantock made a song-cycle of the poem in 1941, scored for baritone or contralto and orchestra. The saxophonist and jazz composer Trish Clowes included a setting of The Sphinx, with vocals by Kathleen Willison, on her 2012 album And in the Night-Time She Is There.

Jacob Epstein's memorial over the grave of Oscar Wilde in the Père Lachaise Cemetery in Paris takes the form of a "flying demon-angel", to use his own words, based on the description of the god Ammon in Wilde's poem, and includes a sphinx whispering into the main figure's ear.

The poem is read by the title character in the 1945 film The Picture of Dorian Gray, based on Wilde's novel of the same name. Its presence in the film is an anachronism, however, as it is set in 1886, eight years before the poem was published.
