= Émaux et Camées =

Émaux et Camées (Enamels and Cameos) is a collection of poetry by the French poet Théophile Gautier.

Originally published in 1852 with 18 poems, Émaux et camées, the final edition (1872) contains 48 poems. Whereas Gautier's earlier work was more concerned with romantic aestheticism, the formalism of this last collection is a point of reference for the arrival of Parnassianism.

== Partial Contents ==
- Préface
- Affinités secrètes
- Le Poème de la Femme
- Études de mains
- Variations sur le Carnaval de Venise
- Symphonie en Blanc Majeur
- Coquetterie posthume
- Diamant du cœur
- Premier Sourire du Printemps
- Contralto
- Caerulei oculi
- Rondalla
- L'Aveugle
- Lied
- Fantaisies d'hiver
- La Source
- Bûchers et tombeaux
- Le Souper des armures
- La Montre
- Les Nereides
- Les Accroche-cœurs
- La Rose-thé
- Carmen
- Ce que disent les hirondelles. Chanson d'automne
- Noël
- Les Joujoux de la morte
- Après le feuilleton
- Le Château du Souvenir
- Camélia et Paquerette
- La Fellah
- La Mansarde
- La Nue
- Le Merle
- La Fleur qui fait le printemps
- Dernier Vœu
- Plaintive Tourterelle
- La Bonne Soirée
- L'Art
