= Nun (biblical figure) =

Man in the Bible

Nun /ˈnʊn/ (Hebrew: נוּן, romanized: Nūn, 'Perpetuity'), in the Hebrew Bible, was a man from the Tribe of Ephraim, grandson of Ammihud, son of Elishama, and father of Joshua (1 Chronicles 7:26–27).

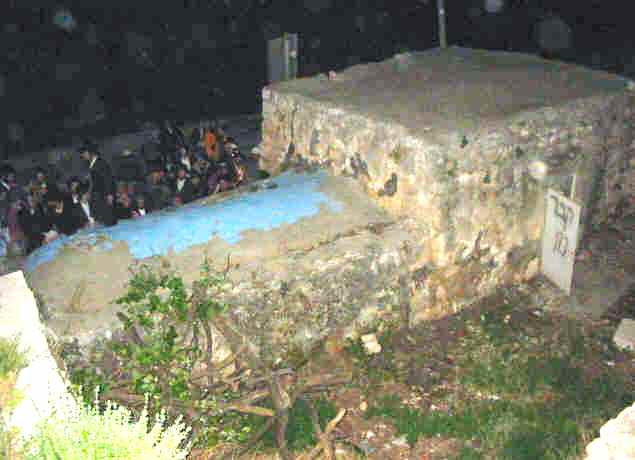
Nun's grave, Kifl Haris, traditionally identified with Timnat Serah

== Biblical context ==
Nun grew up in and may have lived his entire life in the Israelites' Egyptian captivity, where the Egyptians "made life bitter for them with harsh labor at mortar and bricks and with all sorts of tasks in the field" (Exodus 1:14). In Aramaic, "nun" means "fish". Thus the Midrash tells: "[T]he son of him whose name was as the name of a fish would lead them [the Israelites] into the land" (Genesis Rabba 97:3). In ancient Egypt (where Joshua “son of Nun” was born) Nun referred to the primordial watery abyss out of which the Pharaonic solar deity (‘Ra’) arose.

== Traditional tomb ==
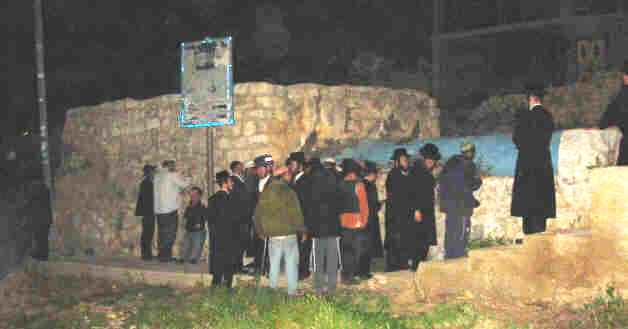
Nun's grave

A Jewish tradition places Nun's tomb near that of his son Joshua who, according to Joshua 24:30, is buried in Timnat Serah whereas in Judges 2:9 it is mentioned as Timnath-heres. The similarly named Israeli village of Kifl Hares, located northwest of Ariel in Samaria (Northern West Bank), is now home to both tombs.
