= Joshua Roll =

Byzantine illuminated manuscript

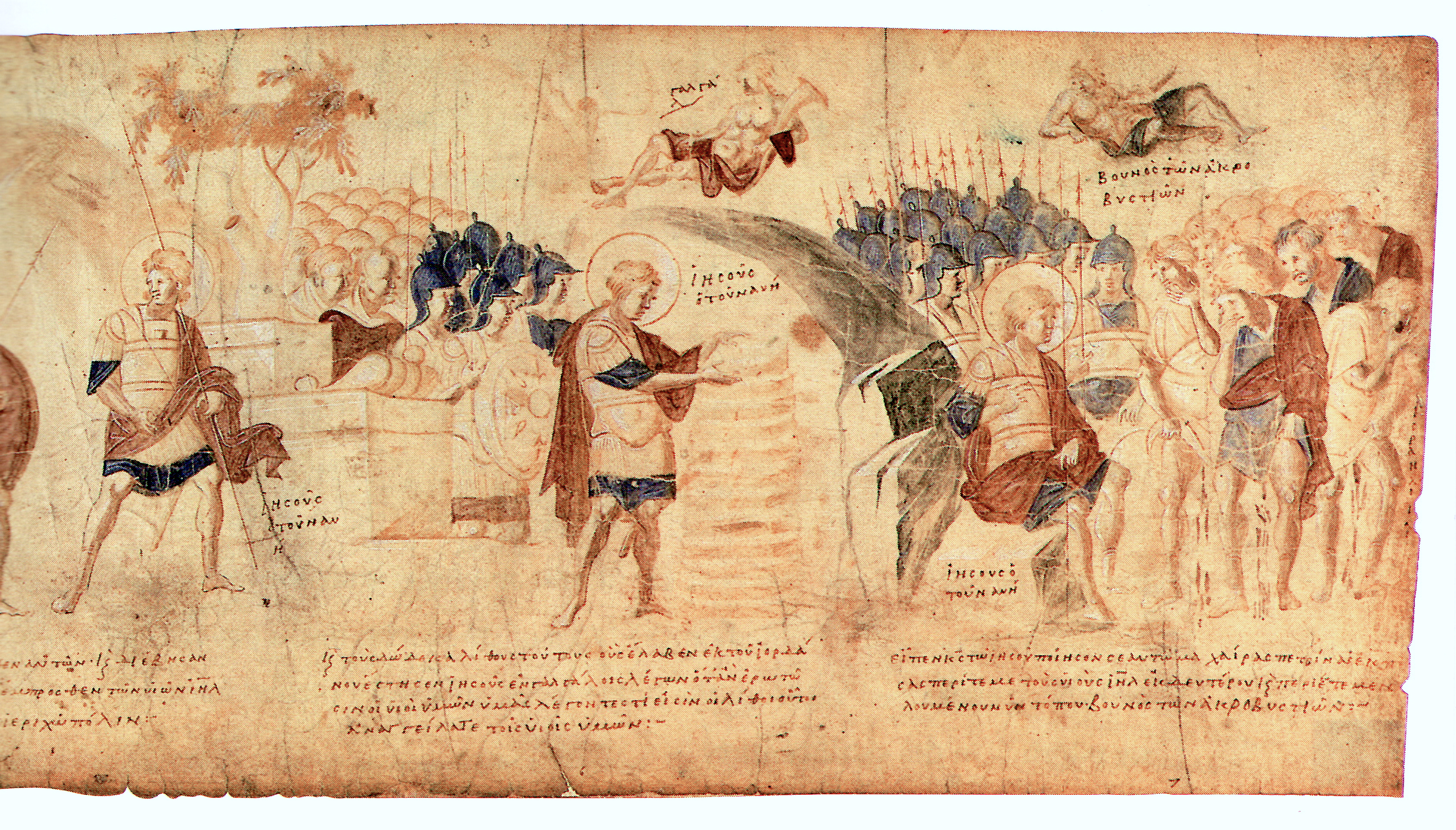
Sheet 3 of the Joshua Roll; Joshua and the Israelites

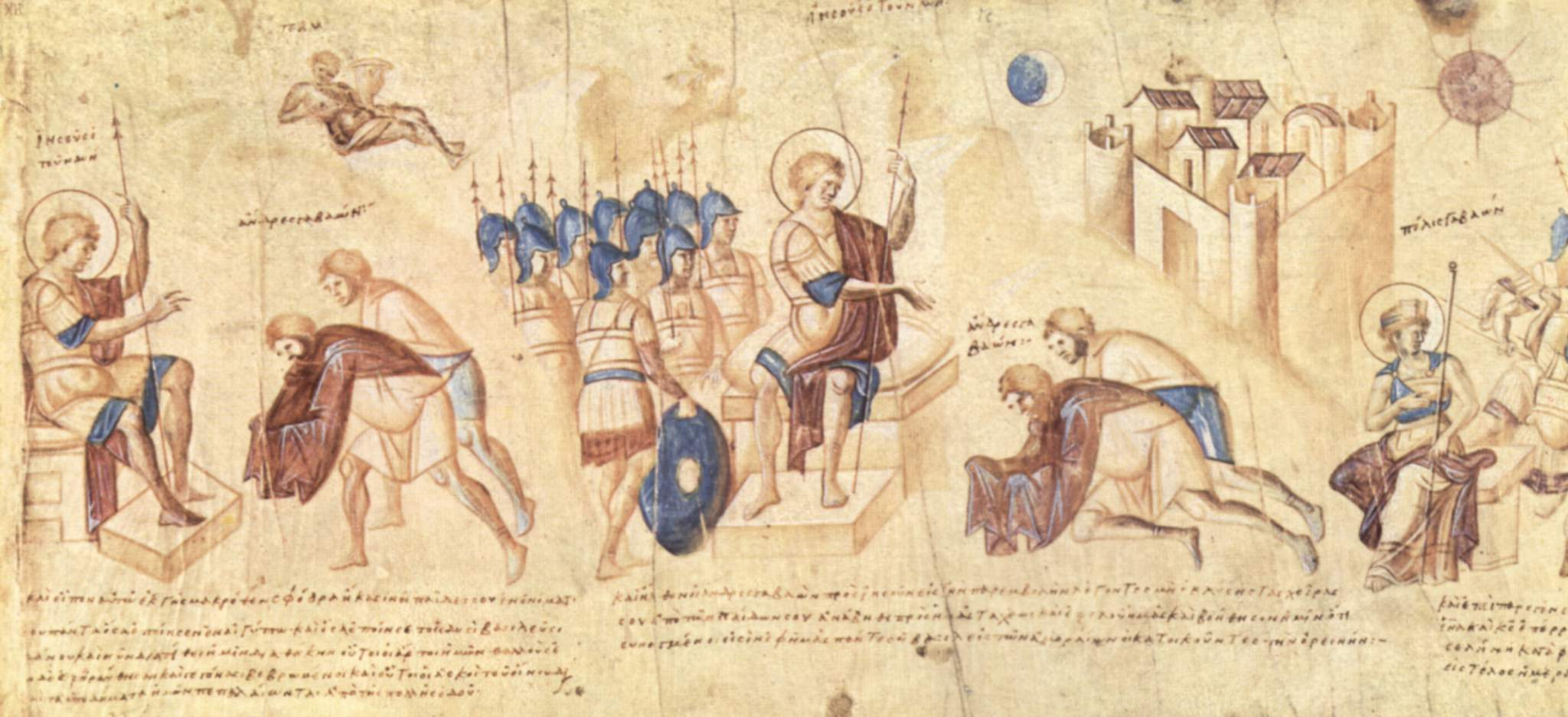
Portion of the Joshua Roll; scenes before the battle at Gibeon – the moon and sun are seen at the right.

The Joshua Roll is a Byzantine illuminated manuscript of highly unusual format, probably of the 10th century Macedonian Renaissance, believed to have been created by artists of the imperial workshops in Constantinople, and now in the Vatican Library.

== Form and content ==
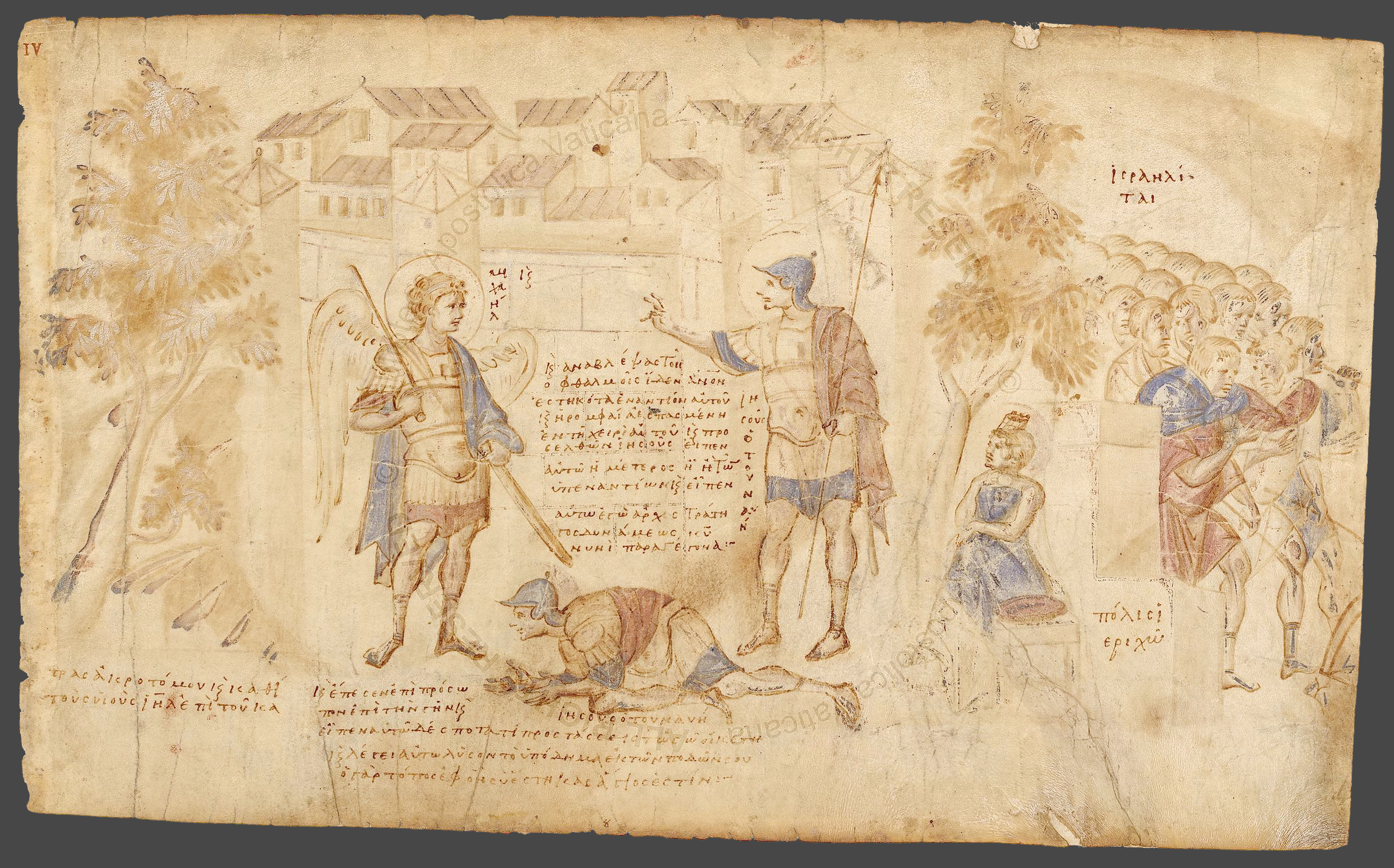
Joshua and the Angel, Joshua Roll, Sheet 12, Rome, 10th century. Height, 12 3/4 in. (32.4 cm). Biblioteca Apostolica Vaticana.

The Roll is in the form of a continuous horizontal scroll or rotulus, common in Chinese art but unique in surviving examples of medieval Christian art. It is made of several joined pieces of sheep vellum, is 31 cm high and about 10 metres long, and may be incomplete, as it starts with Chapter II and ends with Chapter X. The Roll covers the early part of the Old Testament Book of Joshua using a reduced version of the Septuagint text; it includes Joshua's main military successes, ending with conquered kings paying him homage. At roughly this time, the Byzantine empire was enjoying military success in its campaigns in the Holy Land. It was originally painted in grisaille, by several artists, with partial coloring added later in a separate stage. The lettering is in majuscule and minuscule forms.

Sheet 12 of the Joshua Roll provides an example of many of the artistic trends and choices made by its creator that can be found throughout the roll. This sheet depicts the scene of Joshua and the Angel, where an angel appears before Joshua in a commander's uniform. Most notable is Joshua’s appearance in this sheet not once but twice: standing and prostrate. The roll aims to tell a continuous narrative, and as such, figures like Joshua appear multiple times throughout the roll to accurately depict the script they accompany. However, based on the curving and squeezing of the script between and around scenes, the miniatures took clear precedent. Rather than being consistently placed throughout the roll, the writing curves around the paintings instead of the images conforming to the space allotted to them by pre-existing script.

This is evident in Sheet 12 of the roll and many others. The passages provide excerpts and additions to the Book of Joshua, as opposed to copying the full text, in order to better suit the illuminations. The style of the illuminations are relatively realistic in the anatomy and proportions of the figures, and there are loose attempts to add elements such as trees and cityscapes to create a sense of time and space. These elements, as well as the poses and garb of the figures, take clear inspiration from classical Roman art. Another classical element is the inclusion of personifications. In Sheet 12, for example, the city of Jericho is personified by the seated woman to the right of Joshua. Female personifications of cities are found throughout the Joshua Roll, often wearing headpieces that look like small cities or buildings.

== Style ==
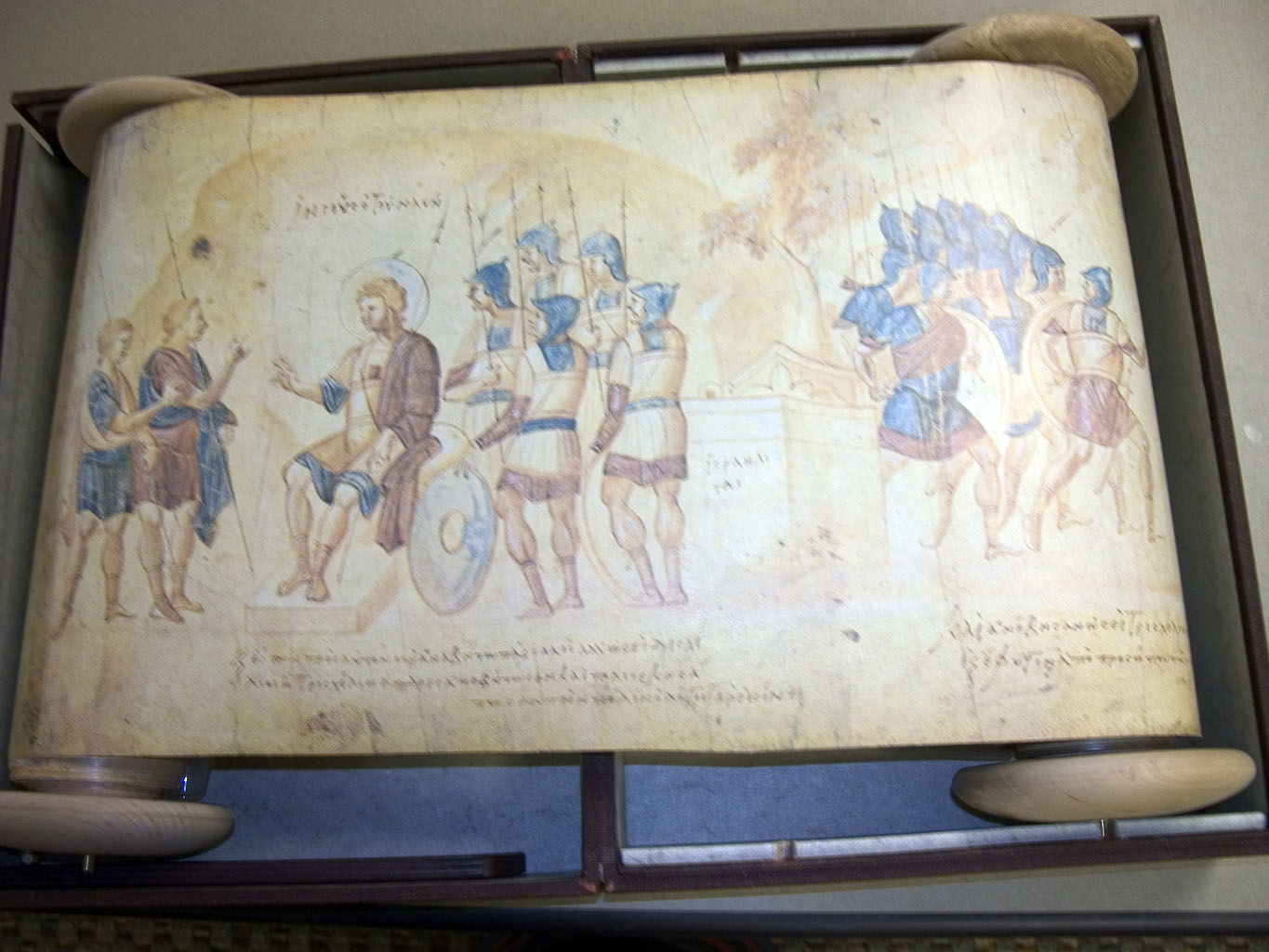
A facsimile mounted on its rollers

Like the Paris Psalter, with which it is usually discussed, it is heavily classicising in style, though the extent to which this represents a revival or copying from a much earlier model is the subject of much debate. Its origins have been much debated by art historians, and the roll is considered to be "one of the most important and difficult problems of Byzantine art." The roll itself is usually acknowledged to be of the 10th century AD, but the images are felt by most art historians to derive from one or more earlier works, perhaps going back as far as Late Antiquity. The subject produced a sharp disagreement between Kurt Weitzmann, who thought the form of the roll was a classicising invention of the Macedonian Renaissance, and Meyer Schapiro, who, whilst agreeing with Weitzmann on a 10th-century date, held to the more traditional view that painted rotuli existed in Late Antiquity, and that the roll was essentially copied from such a work, perhaps through intermediaries.

The images are clearly closely related to later manuscripts of the Octateuch or first eight books of the Old Testament, but where and when the compositions for the cycle originated is controversial.

Steven Wander, professor at the University of Connecticut, claims the images are slanted at ten degrees, in a continuous frieze along the ten meters of the roll. He suggests this may be because the roll was a copy of the actual preparatory sketches or working drawings for a real column, possibly to scale, like the Ottonian bronze Easter column (Latin: colonna) made for the bishop Bernward of Hildesheim, the Bernward Column in St Michael's Church.

== See also ==
- Castelseprio – Frescoes in a related style
- Leo Bible
- Macedonian Renaissance
- Utrecht Psalter

== General and cited references ==
- Walther, Ingo F. and Norbert Wolf. Codices Illustres: The world's most famous illuminated manuscripts, 400 to 1600. Köln, TASCHEN, 2005
