= Judges 18 =

Book of Judges, chapter 18

- ← chapter 17 chapter 19 →
- The pages containing the Book of Judges in Leningrad Codex (1008 CE)
- Book: Book of Judges
- Hebrew Bible part: Nevi'im
- Order in the Hebrew part: 2
- Category: Former Prophets
- Christian Bible part: Old Testament (Heptateuch)
- Order in the Christian part: 7

Judges 18 is the eighteenth chapter of the Book of Judges in the Old Testament or the Hebrew Bible. According to Jewish tradition the book was attributed to the prophet Samuel, but modern scholars view it as part of the Deuteronomistic History, which spans in the books of Deuteronomy to 2 Kings, attributed to nationalistic and devotedly Yahwistic writers during the time of the reformer Judean king Josiah in 7th century BCE. This chapter records the activities of the tribe of Dan, and belongs to a section comprising Judges 17 to 21.

== Text ==
This chapter was originally written in the Hebrew language. It is divided into 31 verses.

=== Textual witnesses ===
Some early manuscripts containing the text of this chapter in Hebrew are of the Masoretic Text tradition, which includes the Codex Cairensis (895), Aleppo Codex (10th century), and Codex Leningradensis (1008).

Extant ancient manuscripts of a translation into Koine Greek known as the Septuagint (originally was made in the last few centuries BCE) include Codex Vaticanus (B; $\mathfrak{G}$^{B}; 4th century) and Codex Alexandrinus (A; $\mathfrak{G}$^{A}; 5th century). (Note: The whole book of Judges is missing from the extant Codex Sinaiticus.)

== Analysis ==
=== Double Introduction and Double Conclusion ===
Chapters 17 to 21 contain the "Double Conclusion" of the Book of Judges and form a type of inclusio together with their counterpart, the "Double Introduction", in chapters 1 to 3:6 as in the following structure of the whole book:

A. Foreign wars of subjugation with the ḥērem being applied (1:1–2:5)

B. Difficulties with foreign religious idols (2:6–3:6)

Main part: the "cycles" section(3:7–16:31)

B'. Difficulties with domestic religious idols (17:1–18:31)

A'. Domestic wars with the ḥērem being applied (19:1–21:25)

There are similar parallels between the double introduction and the double conclusion as the following:

Introduction 1 (1:1–2:5)	Conclusion 2 (19:1–21:25)
The Israelites asked the LORD, saying, "Who will be the first to go up and fight for us against the Canaanites?"; The LORD answered, "Judah is to go...." (1:1–2)	The Israelites ... inquired of God ... "Who of us shall go first to fight against the Benjaminites?"; The LORD replied, "Judah...." (20:18)
The story of how Othniel got his wife (1:11–15)	The story of how the remainder of the Benjaminites got their wives (21:1–25)
The Benjaminites fail to drive out the Jebusites from Jebus (1:21)	A Levite carefully avoiding the Jebusites in Jebus suffers terrible outrage in Gibeah of Benjamin (19:1–30)
Bochim: God's covenant; Israel's unlawful covenants with the Canaanites; Israel weeping before the angel (messenger) of YHWH (1:1–2)	Bethel: the ark of the covenant of God; Israel weeps and fasts before the LORD (20:26–29)
Introduction 2 (2:6–3:6)	Conclusion 1 (17:1–18:31)
The degeneration of the generations after the death of Joshua (2:6–19); God leaves certain nations "to test the Israelites to see whether they would obey the LORD's commands, which he had given... through Moses" (2:20–3:4)	A mother dedicates silver to the Lord for her son to make an idol; That son makes one of his own sons a priest in his idolatrous shrine, then replaces him with a Levite. That Levite is Moses' grandson. He and his sons become priests at Dan's shrine

The entire double conclusion is connected by the four-time repetition of a unique statement: twice in full at the beginning and the end of the double conclusion and twice in the center of the section as follows:

A. In those days there was no king...

Every man did what right in his own eyes (17:6)

B. In those days there was no king... (18:1)
B'. In those days there was no king... (19:1)

A'. In those days there was no king...

Every man did what right in his own eyes (21:25)

It also contains internal links:

Conclusion 1 (17:1–18:31): A Levite in Judah moving to the hill country of Ephraim and then on to Dan.
Conclusion 2 (19:1–21:25): A Levite in Ephraim looking for his concubine in Bethlehem in Judah.

Both sections end with a reference to Shiloh.

=== The Bethlehem Trilogy ===
Three sections of the Hebrew Bible (Old Testament)—Judges 17–18, Judges 19–21, Ruth 1–4—form a trilogy with a link to the city Bethlehem of Judah and characterized by the repetitive unique statement:

"In those days there was no king in Israel; everyone did what was right in his own eyes"
(Judges 17:6; 18:1; 19:1; 21:25; cf. Ruth 1:1)

as in the following chart:

Judges 17–18	Judges 19–20	Ruth 1–4
A Levite of Bethlehem (17:7)	A Levite of Ephraim who took as his maiden a concubine from Bethlehem	A movement from a Moabite to David in Bethlehem (4:17-22)
Left to seek employment (17:7, 9)	Received his concubine from Bethlehem to which she had fled	A man left Bethlehem, but unlike the other two stories does not ultimately deface the town, but enhances its name
Came to a young man of Ephraim (Micah) (17:1-5, 8)	Returned to Ephraim by way of Gibeah of Benjamin	Bethlehem became the subtle setting for the birthplace of King David
Served as a private chaplain in Micah’s illicit chapel (17:10-13)	Set upon by evil men who brutalized her and left her for dead	
Hired by the tribe of Dan as a priest and relocated in Laish (N. Galilee)	Her husband related the event to all of Israel (cut up)	
Established a cult center which continually caused God’s people to stumble	They attacked the tribe of Benjamin almost annihilating it	
The Levite was Jonathan the son of Gershom and the grandson of Moses (18:30)	Repopulated Benjamin with women from Shiloh and Jabesh Gilead for the 600 surviving men of Benjamin	
	Jabesh-Gilead was (probably) the home of Saul’s ancestors [thus his interest in it]	
	Reflects badly on Benjamin and by implication Saul—Saul’s ancestors humiliated and disgraced a Bethlehemite	
	Bethlehem suffered at the hands of Benjaminites	

=== The founding story of Dan ===
Chapters 17–18 record a Danite founding narrative that gives insight into Israelite early religious lives, and the ideology of war as background to the establishment of Dan as a city. Reading the entire section in the light of Deuteronomy 12:1–13:1, there are several thematic elements and concerns in common, although Judges 17:1–18:31 usually portrays them antithetically.

Theme	Deuteronomy 12:1–13:1	Judges 17:1–18:31
Cult sites on hills	to be destroyed (12:2)	constructed (17:3-4)
Idols	to be cut down (12:3a)	manufactured (17:3–4)
Ideal of central shrine	repeatedly endorsed (12:4–7, 11, 13–14, 17–18, 26–27)	repeatedly and ironically ignored (17:2b–5, 13; 18:31b)
What is right in ... own eyes	prohibited (12:8)	practiced (17:6b)
Support of Levites	at central shrine (12:12, 18, 19)	at private shrines (17:7–13; 18:19–20, 30b)
YHWH to let live in safety	future Israel (12:10b)	not Dan but Laish (18:7b, 10a, 27a)
YHWH to extend territory	future Israel (12:20a)	not Dan but Laish (18:7b, 10a, 28)

== The Danite spies (18:1–13) ==
This chapter starts with the report of a Danite clan in search of a new homeland, sending out a reconnaissance mission (verse 2; cf. Numbers 13; Joshua 2; Judges 6:10–14). While receiving hospitality in Micah's household, the Danite spies met the Levite at Micah's shrine and could have recognized the priest's southern accent or dialect (verse 3). A request for an oracle or a sign before battle is a typical feature of traditional Israelite war accounts (verse 5, 6; cf. Judges 4:5, 8 on Deborah and Judges 6:13 on Gideon). The Danite spies identified the town Laish in far north with military vulnerability as a target to conquer.

=== Verse 1 ===
In those days there was no king in Israel: and in those days the tribe of the Danites sought them an inheritance to dwell in; for unto that day all their inheritance had not fallen unto them among the tribes of Israel.

- "Unto that day": the Danites first tried to settle on the low land (Shephelah) between the coast and the Judaean hills (Judges 1:34), but they were pushed back into the hills, so they had to dwell between Zorah and Eshtaol in the west of Judah territory as stated in this chapter and in the story of Samson. The migration to the sources of the Jordan River in the North as recorded in this chapter (cf. Joshua 19:47) apparently was completed at the time of Deborah as implied in Judges 5:17, so the present narrative happened in an early period of the Judges.

=== Verse 12 ===
Then they went up and encamped in Kirjath Jearim in Judah. (Therefore they call that place Mahaneh Dan to this day. There it is, west of Kirjath Jearim.)

- "Kiriath Jearim": meaning "Town of Forests", a town about 8 miles (13 km) northwest of Jerusalem, now "Tell el-Azhar" or "Kiryat-el-enab".
- "Mahaneh Dan": literally, "Camp of Dan". This cannot be the same as "Mahaneh Dan" between Zorah and Eshtaol in Judges 13:25, because the two places are located about 7 miles (11 km) from each other, which was the distance traveled for one day.

== The Danites take Micah's idols and the Levites with them (18:14–26) ==
This passage has an "aura of banditry" that is also found in the accounts of David's early career, such as his encounters with the priest at Nob (1 Samuel 21:1–9) and with Nabal (1 Samuel 25:2–38), as the armed Danites would take what they need or desire against any resistance and even manage to make their intentions seem inevitable and logical (cf. verses 19, 23–25). When Micah confronted the Danites to protest the taking away of his idols along with the Levite and his family, the Danites responded self-righteously ('wonderfully disingenuous') with "What's it to you?" or "What troubles you that you call up [a force against us]?" (verse 22), basically putting the guilt to the robbed person if a bloodbath would happen. Like Laban (Jacob's father-in-law; cf. Genesis 31), Micah, who was "not above cheating his own mother", knew he had been bested and returned home empty-handed (verse 26).

== The Danites settle in Laish (18:27–31) ==
The conquest of Laish by the Danites is reported using the language of biblical "ban" in Deuteronomy and Joshua ("putting to the sword and burning") but here the intention is quite different (cf. Judges 18:7–10). The use of the word pesel ("idol" or "graven image") in verses 30–31 as in Judges 17:3, 4; 18:14, indicates the disapproval of the idolatry of the Danites (and Micah), as there is clear comparison to the 'God's house' which was then in the sanctuary at Shiloh.

=== Verse 30 ===
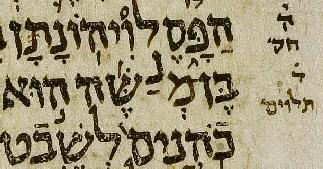
The superscripted נַ in Judges 18:30 on the name "Manasseh" in the Aleppo Codex

And the children of Dan set up the graven image: and Jonathan, the son of Gershom, the son of Manasseh, he and his sons were priests to the tribe of Dan until the day of the captivity of the land.

- "Jonathan": the name of the "young Levite" in chapters 17 and 18 is only revealed here as a complete surprise, as the scandal of Dan's idolatry now also brings dishonor on the revered name of the priest's ancestors.
- "Manasseh": This name is written in Masoretic Text with a "raised nun" between letters mem and shin of mšh ("Moses") to be read as mnšh ("Manasseh"), likely not to be mentioned "Moses" as written to avoid publicly dishonoring Moses' name, as also admitted by Jewish rabbis. Vulgate and some Septuagint manuscripts have the name "Moses" here, whereas other Septuagint manuscripts have "Manasses". If this is the case, the hereditary priesthood of Dan is said to belong to the line of Moses rather than the line of Aaron. Jonathan could be Moses' actual grandson, since he is contemporary with Phinehas (Judges 20:28).
- "The captivity of the land": is identified with the deportation of Dan's population to Assyria by Tiglath-pileser III in 734 BCE (2 Kings 15:29). This follows a different timeline to verse 31 that Micah's Idol remained in that place until the fall of Shiloh in the 11th century BCE (at the time of Eli and Samuel), which would eventually be replaced by a golden calf in the beginning of Jeroboam's reign (c. 930 BCE).

== See also ==
- Bethrehob
- Ephod
- Idol
- Kohen
- Levites
- Micah's Idol
- Mount Ephraim
- Teraphim
- Tribe of Dan
- Related Bible parts: Joshua 19, Judges 17, 2 Kings 15

== Sources ==
- Chisholm, Robert B. Jr. (2009). "The Chronology of the Book of Judges: A Linguistic Clue to Solving a Pesky Problem" (PDF). Journal of the Evangelical Theological Society. 52 (2): 247–255. Archived from the original (PDF) on 2022-11-08.
- Coogan, Michael David (2007). Coogan, Michael David; Brettler, Marc Zvi; Newsom, Carol Ann; Perkins, Pheme (eds.). The New Oxford Annotated Bible with the Apocryphal/Deuterocanonical Books: New Revised Standard Version, Issue 48 (Augmented 3rd ed.). Oxford University Press. ISBN 978-0195288810.
- Fitzmyer, Joseph A. (2008). A Guide to the Dead Sea Scrolls and Related Literature. Grand Rapids, MI: William B. Eerdmans Publishing Company. ISBN 9780802862419.
- Halley, Henry H. (1965). Halley's Bible Handbook: an abbreviated Bible commentary (24th (revised) ed.). Zondervan Publishing House. ISBN 0-310-25720-4.
- Hayes, Christine (2015). Introduction to the Bible. Yale University Press. ISBN 978-0300188271.
- Niditch, Susan (2007). "10. Judges". In Barton, John; Muddiman, John (eds.). The Oxford Bible Commentary (first (paperback) ed.). Oxford University Press. pp. 176–191. ISBN 978-0199277186.
- Ulrich, Eugene, ed. (2010). The Biblical Qumran Scrolls: Transcriptions and Textual Variants. Brill.
- Webb, Barry G. (2012). The Book of Judges. New International Commentary on the Old Testament. Eerdmans Publishing Company. ISBN 9780802826282.
- Würthwein, Ernst (1995). The Text of the Old Testament. Translated by Rhodes, Erroll F. Grand Rapids, MI: Wm. B. Eerdmans. ISBN 0-8028-0788-7.
- Younger, K. Lawson (2002). Judges and Ruth. The NIV Application Commentary. Zondervan. ISBN 978-0310206361.
