= Judges 20 =

Book of Judges, chapter 20

- ← chapter 19 chapter 21 →
- The pages containing the Book of Judges in Leningrad Codex (1008 CE).
- Book: Book of Judges
- Hebrew Bible part: Nevi'im
- Order in the Hebrew part: 2
- Category: Former Prophets
- Christian Bible part: Old Testament (Heptateuch)
- Order in the Christian part: 7

Judges 20 is the twentieth chapter of the Book of Judges in the Old Testament or the Hebrew Bible. According to Jewish tradition the book was attributed to the prophet Samuel, but modern scholars view it as part of the Deuteronomistic History, which spans in the books of Deuteronomy to 2 Kings, attributed to nationalistic and devotedly Yahwistic writers during the time of the reformer Judean king Josiah in 7th century BCE. This chapter records the war between the tribe of Benjamin and the other eleven tribes of Israel, belonging to a section comprising Judges 17 to 21.

== Text ==
This chapter was originally written in the Hebrew language. It is divided into 48 verses.

=== Textual witnesses ===
Some early manuscripts containing the text of this chapter in Hebrew are of the Masoretic Text tradition, which includes the Codex Cairensis (895), Aleppo Codex (10th century), and Codex Leningradensis (1008).

Extant ancient manuscripts of a translation into Koine Greek known as the Septuagint (originally was made in the last few centuries BCE) include Codex Vaticanus (B; $\mathfrak{G}$^{B}; 4th century) and Codex Alexandrinus (A; $\mathfrak{G}$^{A}; 5th century). (Note: The whole book of Judges is missing from the extant Codex Sinaiticus.)

== Analysis ==
=== Double Introduction and Double Conclusion ===
Chapters 17 to 21 contain the "Double Conclusion" of the Book of Judges and form a type of inclusio together with their counterpart, the "Double Introduction", in chapters 1 to 3:6 as in the following structure of the whole book:

A. Foreign wars of subjugation with the ḥērem being applied (1:1–2:5)

B. Difficulties with foreign religious idols (2:6–3:6)

Main part: the "cycles" section(3:7–16:31)

B'. Difficulties with domestic religious idols (17:1–18:31)

A'. Domestic wars with the ḥērem being applied (19:1–21:25)

There are similar parallels between the double introduction and the double conclusion as the following:

Introduction 1 (1:1–2:5)	Conclusion 2 (19:1–21:25)
The Israelites asked the LORD, saying, "Who will be the first to go up and fight for us against the Canaanites?"; The LORD answered, "Judah is to go…." (1:1–2)	The Israelites ... inquired of God ... "Who of us shall go first to fight against the Benjaminites?"; The LORD replied, "Judah…." (20:18)
The story of how Othniel got his wife (1:11–15)	The story of how the remainder of the Benjaminites got their wives (21:1–25)
The Benjaminites fail to drive out the Jebusites from Jebus (1:21)	A Levite carefully avoiding the Jebusites in Jebus suffers terrible outrage in Gibeah of Benjamin (19:1–30)
Bochim: God's covenant; Israel's unlawful covenants with the Canaanites; Israel weeping before the angel (messenger) of YHWH (1:1–2)	Bethel: the ark of the covenant of God; Israel weeps and fasts before the LORD (20:26–29)
Introduction 2 (2:6–3:6)	Conclusion 1 (17:1–18:31)
The degeneration of the generations after the death of Joshua (2:6–19); God leaves certain nations "to test the Israelites to see whether they would obey the LORD's commands, which he had given… through Moses" (2:20–3:4)	A mother dedicates silver to the Lord for her son to make an idol; That son makes one of his own sons a priest in his idolatrous shrine, then replaces him with a Levite. That Levite is Moses' grandson. He and his sons become priests at Dan's shrine

The entire double conclusion is connected by the four-time repetition of a unique statement: twice in full at the beginning and the end of the double conclusion and twice in the center of the section as follows:

A. In those days there was no king…

Every man did what right in his own eyes (17:6)

B. In those days there was no king… (18:1)
B'. In those days there was no king… (19:1)

A'. In those days there was no king…

Every man did what right in his own eyes (21:25)

It also contains internal links:

Conclusion 1 (17:1–18:31): A Levite in Judah moving to the hill country of Ephraim and then on to Dan.
Conclusion 2 (19:1–21:25): A Levite in Ephraim looking for his concubine in Bethlehem in Judah.

Both sections end with a reference to Shiloh.

=== The Bethlehem Trilogy ===
Three sections of the Hebrew Bible (Old Testament) — Judges 17–18, Judges 19–21, Ruth 1–4 — form a trilogy with a link to the city Bethlehem of Judah and characterized by the repetitive unique statement:

"In those days there was no king in Israel; everyone did what was right in his own eyes"
(Judges 17:6; 18:1; 19:1; 21:25; cf. Ruth 1:1)

as in the following chart:

Judges 17–18	Judges 19–20	Ruth 1–4
A Levite of Bethlehem (17:7)	A Levite of Ephraim who took as his maiden a concubine from Bethlehem	A movement from a Moabite to David in Bethlehem (4:17-22)
Left to seek employment (17:7, 9)	Received his concubine from Bethlehem to which she had fled	A man left Bethlehem, but unlike the other two stories does not ultimately deface the town, but enhances its name
Came to a young man of Ephraim (Micah) (17:1-5, 8)	Returned to Ephraim by way of Gibeah of Benjamin	Bethlehem became the subtle setting for the birthplace of King David
Served as a private chaplain in Micah's illicit chapel (17:10-13)	Set upon by evil men who brutalized her and left her for dead	
Hired by the tribe of Dan as a priest and relocated in Laish (N. Galilee)	Her husband related the event to all of Israel (cut up)	
Established a cult center which continually caused God's people to stumble	They attacked the tribe of Benjamin almost annihilating it	
The Levite was Jonathan the son of Gershom and the grandson of Moses (18:30)	Repopulated Benjamin with women from Shiloh and Jabesh Gilead for the 600 surviving men of Benjamin	
	Jabesh-Gilead was (probably) the home of Saul's ancestors [thus his interest in it]	
	Reflects badly on Benjamin and by implication Saul—Saul's ancestors humiliated and disgraced a Bethlehemite	
	Bethlehem suffered at the hands of Benjaminites	

=== Chapters 19 to 21 ===
The section comprising Judges 19:1-21:25 has a chiastic structure of five episodes as follows:

A. The Rape of the Concubine (19:1–30)

B. ḥērem ("holy war") of Benjamin (20:1–48)

C. Problem: The Oaths-Benjamin Threatened with Extinction (21:1–5)

B'. ḥērem ("holy war") of Jabesh Gilead (21:6–14)

A'. The Rape of the Daughters of Shiloh (21:15–25)

The rape of the daughters of Shiloh is the ironic counterpoint to the rape of the Levite's concubine, with the "daughter" motif linking the two stories (Judges 19:24 and Judges 21:21), and the women becoming 'doorways leading into and out of war, sources of contention and reconciliation'.

== Preparation for war (20:1–11) ==
This chapter records the detailed process of a civil war that pits the pan-Israelite unity against a tribal unity. It also wrestles with the execution of a 'ban" (Hebrew: herem; "holy war") whether Israel should eliminate a whole tribe to root out evil in its own midst as required in Deuteronomy 13:12-18. As stated in Deuteronomy 13:14, an investigation must first be undertaken before the Israel confederation can declare war against alleged miscreants (verses 3–7; cf. 'base fellows' in Deuteronomy 13:13). The tribe of Benjamin did not send any representative to the gathering, although they have heard about the event (verse 3). The Levite was called to testify about the crime committed against his concubine, but as a sole witness he heightened the evil deed of the Gibeahites, while omitting his cowardly sacrifice of her. There was a unity of the tribes ("as one man" in verses 1, 8, 11) and a single-mindedness in rooting out the evil in their midst, that vengeance was to be directed to the entire city of Gibeah, because of the evildoers in their midst, just as the action against a breaker of covenant would be extended to their families and townsmen (cf. Deuteronomy 13:15–16; Joshua 7:24–25).

=== Verse 1 ===
Then all the children of Israel went out, and the congregation was gathered together as one man, from Dan even to Beersheba, with the land of Gilead, unto the LORD in Mizpeh.

- "From Dan … to Beersheba": Dan was located in the far north of the land, while Beersheba was in the far south, so the phrase denotes all the Israel territory of the land of Canaan.
- "The land of Gilead" was located on the eastern side of the Jordan River ("Trans-Jordan").
- "Mizpeh": the name of several Israelite towns; this most likely refers to Mizpah in Benjamin (Joshua 18:26), identified with modern "Tell-en-Nasbeh", about 13 kilometres (8.1 mi) north of Jerusalem.

== Benjaminite War (20:12–48) ==
The war between the tribe of Benjamin against the other tribes of Israel consists of three battles with similar structure of reports in this chapter. The focus is on how the people of Israel would gradually humble themselves before YHWH (after two losses), so that the goals of Israel and YHWH would coincide (a huge victory against the Benjaminites).

The head count of the fighting men both from the Benjaminites and the other tribes of Israel in verses 15-17 can be compared to the last count in Numbers 26 as follows:

Men able to go to war	Numbers 26	Judges 20
Benjamin	45,600	26,700
The other 11 tribes combined	556,130	400,000
All Israel	601,730	426,700

Assuming that the ratio between the number of men able to go to war and the total population remains relatively constant, the count indicates a decline of almost 30 percent in Israel's population since they entered the land of Canaan, so 'despite the victories under Joshua, Israel has not prospered since its arrival in Canaan' (cf. Deuteronomy 28:29).

The battle report structure, especially for the first battle in chapter 20, is similar to that in chapter 1 as follows:

The battle in Judges 1

- Preinquiry Actions
  - (None)
- Israelites Inquiry
  - "Who will be the first to go up [lb] and fight for us against the Canaanites?" (1:1)
- Yahweh's Response
  - "Judah is to go; I have given the land into their hands" (1:2)
- Result
  - Men of Judah make a deal with the Simeonites but victories come over the bulk of Canaanites (except in the 'mq) (1:3-20)

The battles in Judges 20
First battle

- Preinquiry Actions
  - Make plans against Gibeah and threaten city (20:8-13a)
- Israelites Inquiry
  - "Who of us shall go (lb) first to fight against the Benjaminites?" (20:18a)
- Yahweh's Response
  - "Judah shall go first" (but no promise of victory) (20:18b)
- Result
  - Israelites attack Gibeah en masse, are defeated severely by Benjaminites (20:19-21)

Second battle

- Preinquiry Actions
  - Israelites encourage one another and again take up their positions (20:22)
  - Israelites weep before Yahweh (20:23a)
- Israelites Inquiry
  - "Shall we go up (lb) again to battle against the Benjaminites, our brothers?" (20:23a^{2})
- Yahweh's Response
  - "Go up against them" (20:23b) - no promise of victory
- Result
  - Israelites attack en masse, are defeated severely by Benjaminites (though not quite as badly) (20:24-25)

Third battle

- Preinquiry Actions
  - Israelites—all the people—weep fast, and present sacrifices (20:26)
- Israelites Inquiry
  - Inquiry through Phinehas, the high priest, "Shall we go up [lb] again to battle with Benjamin our brother or not?" (20:28a^{2})
- Yahweh's Response
  - "Go, for tomorrow I will give them into your hands" (20:28b)
- Result
  - Israelites set ambush and herem ("ban"; killing all people, burning all towns) Benjaminites—except for 600 men (20:47, the same number as the Danites in 18:11).

The battle accounts appear to end, but because 600 Benjaminites escape, the finale of the battle is not technically a full imposition of the ban, which, in the Books of Deuteronomy and Joshua, is described as the killing of all human enemies.

=== Verses 26–28 ===
^{26}Then all the children of Israel, and all the people, went up, and came unto the house of God, and wept, and sat there before the LORD, and fasted that day until even, and offered burnt offerings and peace offerings before the LORD.
^{27}And the children of Israel enquired of the LORD, (for the ark of the covenant of God was there in those days,
^{28}And Phinehas, the son of Eleazar, the son of Aaron, stood before it in those days,) saying,

Shall I yet again go out to battle against the children of Benjamin my brother, or shall I cease?

And the Lord said,

Go up; for to morrow I will deliver them into thine hand.

- "House of God": the first assumption of the place is "Bethel" (also in verse 18; Hebrew: בית אל, beit-el; Greek Septuagint Βαιθὴλ, as well as Syriac, Arabic and Chaldee versions), but Vulgate has in verse 18 "house of God, which is in Silo" (Latin: demure Dei, hoc est, in Silo), which is in accordance to Joshua 18:1 where the tabernacle of the congregation was formally pitched at Shiloh and Joshua 22:12 that Phinehas the son of Eleazar was the high priest there (cf 1 Samuel 1:3; 1 Samuel 2:14; 1 Samuel 3:21; 1 Samuel 4:3, and Psalm 78:60 where Shiloh was described as the place of the tabernacle until its capture by the Philistines), whereas there is no hint anywhere of the city of Bethel or any other place having been the location of the ark before being captured by the Philistines.
- "Phinehas": mentioned in Numbers 25:7–13; Joshua 22.

== See also ==
- Aaron
- Baaltamar
- Battle of Gibeah
- Beersheba
- Belial
- Children of Israel
- Civil war
- Dan
- Eleazar
- Gibeah
- Gilead
- Land of Israel
- Levite
- Mizpah
- Phinehas
- Rock of Rimmon
- Sling
- Tribe of Benjamin
- Tribe of Judah
- Related Bible parts: Deuteronomy 13, Joshua 7, Judges 19, Judges 21

== Sources ==
- Chisholm, Robert B. Jr. (2009). "The Chronology of the Book of Judges: A Linguistic Clue to Solving a Pesky Problem" (PDF). Journal of the Evangelical Theological Society. 52 (2): 247–255. Archived from the original (PDF) on 2022-11-08.
- Coogan, Michael David (2007). Coogan, Michael David; Brettler, Marc Zvi; Newsom, Carol Ann; Perkins, Pheme (eds.). The New Oxford Annotated Bible with the Apocryphal/Deuterocanonical Books: New Revised Standard Version, Issue 48 (Augmented 3rd ed.). Oxford University Press. ISBN 978-0195288810.
- Halley, Henry H. (1965). Halley's Bible Handbook: an abbreviated Bible commentary (24th (revised) ed.). Zondervan Publishing House. ISBN 0-310-25720-4.
- Hayes, Christine (2015). Introduction to the Bible. Yale University Press. ISBN 978-0300188271.
- Niditch, Susan (2007). "10. Judges". In Barton, John; Muddiman, John (eds.). The Oxford Bible Commentary (first (paperback) ed.). Oxford University Press. pp. 176–191. ISBN 978-0199277186.
- Webb, Barry G. (2012). The Book of Judges. New International Commentary on the Old Testament. Eerdmans Publishing Company. ISBN 9780802826282.
- Würthwein, Ernst (1995). The Text of the Old Testament. Translated by Rhodes, Erroll F. Grand Rapids, MI: Wm. B. Eerdmans. ISBN 0-8028-0788-7.
- Younger, K. Lawson (2002). Judges and Ruth. The NIV Application Commentary. Zondervan. ISBN 978-0310206361.
