= Judges 17 =

Book of Judges, chapter 17

- ← chapter 16 chapter 18 →
- The pages containing the Book of Judges in Leningrad Codex (1008 CE).
- Book: Book of Judges
- Hebrew Bible part: Nevi'im
- Order in the Hebrew part: 2
- Category: Former Prophets
- Christian Bible part: Old Testament (Heptateuch)
- Order in the Christian part: 7

Judges 17 is the seventeenth chapter of the Book of Judges in the Old Testament or the Hebrew Bible. According to Jewish tradition the book was attributed to the prophet Samuel, but modern scholars view it as part of the Deuteronomistic History, which spans in the books of Deuteronomy to 2 Kings, attributed to nationalistic and devotedly Yahwistic writers during the time of the reformer Judean king Josiah in 7th century BCE. This chapter records the activities of Micah of Ephraim and belongs to a section comprising Judges 17 to 21.

== Text ==
This chapter was originally written in the Hebrew language. It is divided into 13 verses.

=== Textual witnesses ===
Some early manuscripts containing the text of this chapter in Hebrew are of the Masoretic Text tradition, which includes the Codex Cairensis (895), Aleppo Codex (10th century), and Codex Leningradensis (1008).

Extant ancient manuscripts of a translation into Koine Greek known as the Septuagint (originally was made in the last few centuries BCE) include Codex Vaticanus (B; $\mathfrak{G}$^{B}; 4th century) and Codex Alexandrinus (A; $\mathfrak{G}$^{A}; 5th century). (Note: The whole book of Judges is missing from the extant Codex Sinaiticus.)

== Analysis ==
=== Double Introduction and Double Conclusion ===
Chapters 17 to 21 contain the "Double Conclusion" of the Book of Judges and form a type of inclusio together with their counterpart, the "Double Introduction", in chapters 1 to 3:6 as in the following structure of the whole book:

A. Foreign wars of subjugation with the ḥērem being applied (1:1–2:5)

B. Difficulties with foreign religious idols (2:6–3:6)

Main part: the "cycles" section(3:7–16:31)

B'. Difficulties with domestic religious idols (17:1–18:31)

A'. Domestic wars with the ḥērem being applied (19:1–21:25)

There are similar parallels between the double introduction and the double conclusion as the following:

Introduction 1 (1:1–2:5)	Conclusion 2 (19:1–21:25)
The Israelites asked the LORD, saying, "Who will be the first to go up and fight for us against the Canaanites?"; The LORD answered, "Judah is to go…." (1:1–2)	The Israelites … inquired of God … "Who of us shall go first to fight against the Benjaminites?"; The LORD replied, "Judah…." (20:18)
The story of how Othniel got his wife (1:11–15)	The story of how the remainder of the Benjaminites got their wives (21:1–25)
The Benjaminites fail to drive out the Jebusites from Jebus (1:21)	A Levite carefully avoiding the Jebusites in Jebus suffers terrible outrage in Gibeah of Benjamin (19:1–30)
Bochim: God's covenant; Israel's unlawful covenants with the Canaanites; Israel weeping before the angel (messenger) of YHWH (1:1–2)	Bethel: the ark of the covenant of God; Israel weeps and fasts before the LORD (20:26–29)
Introduction 2 (2:6–3:6)	Conclusion 1 (17:1–18:31)
The degeneration of the generations after the death of Joshua (2:6–19); God leaves certain nations "to test the Israelites to see whether they would obey the LORD's commands, which he had given… through Moses" (2:20–3:4)	A mother dedicates silver to the Lord for her son to make an idol; That son makes one of his own sons a priest in his idolatrous shrine, then replaces him with a Levite. That Levite is Moses' grandson. He and his sons become priests at Dan's shrine

The entire double conclusion is connected by the four-time repetition of a unique statement: twice in full at the beginning and the end of the double conclusion and twice in the center of the section as follows:

A. In those days there was no king…

Every man did what right in his own eyes (17:6)

B. In those days there was no king… (18:1)
B'. In those days there was no king… (19:1)

A'. In those days there was no king…

Every man did what right in his own eyes (21:25)

It also contains internal links:

Conclusion 1 (17:1–18:31): A Levite in Judah moving to the hill country of Ephraim and then on to Dan.
Conclusion 2 (19:1–21:25): A Levite in Ephraim looking for his concubine in Bethlehem in Judah.

Both sections end with a reference to Shiloh.

=== The Bethlehem Trilogy ===
Three sections of the Hebrew Bible (Old Testament) — Judges 17–18, Judges 19–21, Ruth 1–4 — form a trilogy with a link to the city Bethlehem of Judah and characterized by the repetitive unique statement:

"In those days there was no king in Israel; everyone did what was right in his own eyes"
(Judges 17:6; 18:1; 19:1; 21:25; cf. Ruth 1:1)

as in the following chart:

Judges 17–18	Judges 19–20	Ruth 1–4
A Levite of Bethlehem (17:7)	A Levite of Ephraim who took as his maiden a concubine from Bethlehem	A movement from a Moabite to David in Bethlehem (4:17-22)
Left to seek employment (17:7, 9)	Received his concubine from Bethlehem to which she had fled	A man left Bethlehem, but unlike the other two stories does not ultimately deface the town, but enhances its name
Came to a young man of Ephraim (Micah) (17:1-5, 8)	Returned to Ephraim by way of Gibeah of Benjamin	Bethlehem became the subtle setting for the birthplace of King David
Served as a private chaplain in Micah’s illicit chapel (17:10-13)	Set upon by evil men who brutalized her and left her for dead	
Hired by the tribe of Dan as a priest and relocated in Laish (N. Galilee)	Her husband related the event to all of Israel (cut up)	
Established a cult center which continually caused God’s people to stumble	They attacked the tribe of Benjamin almost annihilating it	
The Levite was Jonathan the son of Gershom and the grandson of Moses (18:30)	Repopulated Benjamin with women from Shiloh and Jabesh Gilead for the 600 surviving men of Benjamin	
	Jabesh-Gilead was (probably) the home of Saul’s ancestors [thus his interest in it]	
	Reflects badly on Benjamin and by implication Saul—Saul’s ancestors humiliated and disgraced a Bethlehemite	
	Bethlehem suffered at the hands of Benjaminites	

=== The founding myth of Dan ===
Chapters 17–18 record a Danite founding myth that gives insight into Israelite early religious lives, and the ideology of war as background to the establishment of Dan as a city. Reading the entire section in the light of Deuteronomy 12:1–13:1, there are several thematic elements and concerns in common, although Judges 17:1–18:31 usually portrays them antithetically.

== Micah's idols (17:1–6) ==
The section starts with a confession of a guilty son named Micah, who had stolen his mother's money, but now returned it to her. The mother was not angry, but instead praised God for her son's remorse and asked him to dedicate the money to YHWH by making a "a carved statue" (Hebrew: pesel) and "a cast metal icon" (Hebrew massemka), which were used as symbols of a deity's indwelling presence (cf. Micah's words to the Danites in Judges 18:24). Micah completed his private shrine with a 'divinatory ephod' (cf Gideon's in Judges 8:27) and teraphim (cf. Genesis 31:30, 34-5), then installed one of his own sons to serve as priest.

=== Verse 2 ===
And he said to his mother, "The eleven hundred shekels of silver that were taken from you, and on which you put a curse, even saying it in my ears—here is the silver with me; I took it."
And his mother said, "May you be blessed by the Lord, my son!"

- "Eleven hundred shekels of silver": About 28 pounds, or 13 kilograms. This is exactly the amount of money offered to Delilah to betray Samson from each of the five Philistine lord's (Judges 16:5). There is no support that Delilah could be Micah's mother (different nation, different time period), so the phrase "1100 shekels of silver" serves only as a literary link between the two stories.

== Micah and the Levite (17:7–13) ==
This section shows the venerable status of Levites in Israel (cf. 1 Samuel 1:1; 1 Chronicles 6:26), so the presence of a levitical priest would lend a special recognition to a shrine, 'granting its owner prestige and divine blessing'.

=== Verses 7–8 ===
^{7}And there was a young man out of Bethlehemjudah of the family of Judah, who was a Levite, and he sojourned there.
^{8} And the man departed out of the city from Bethlehemjudah to sojourn where he could find a place: and he came to mount Ephraim to the house of Micah, as he journeyed.

- "Out of Bethlehemjudah": Among the cities of Judah, Bethlehem is not a Levitical town (Joshua 21:9–16), and Judges 18:30 states that this Levite is actually a descendant of Gershom, the son of Moses (Exodus 2:22; 6:18–20), so he is a member of the Kohathite clan, which are allotted ten towns from the families of the tribe of Ephraim, of the tribe of Dan and of the (cis-Jordan) half-tribe of Manasseh (Joshua 21:5, 20–26). Therefore, this Levite should not have been living in Bethlehem in Judah and probably did not get enough support, so he had to find a place somewhere else.

== See also ==
- Jonathan
- Levites
- Mount Ephraim
- Tribe of Ephraim
- Related Bible parts: Judges 18

== Sources ==
- Chisholm, Robert B. Jr. (2009). "The Chronology of the Book of Judges: A Linguistic Clue to Solving a Pesky Problem" (PDF). Journal of the Evangelical Theological Society. 52 (2): 247–255. Archived from the original (PDF) on 2022-11-08.
- Coogan, Michael David (2007). Coogan, Michael David; Brettler, Marc Zvi; Newsom, Carol Ann; Perkins, Pheme (eds.). The New Oxford Annotated Bible with the Apocryphal/Deuterocanonical Books: New Revised Standard Version, Issue 48 (Augmented 3rd ed.). Oxford University Press. ISBN 978-0195288810.
- Halley, Henry H. (1965). Halley's Bible Handbook: an abbreviated Bible commentary (24th (revised) ed.). Zondervan Publishing House. ISBN 0-310-25720-4.
- Hayes, Christine (2015). Introduction to the Bible. Yale University Press. ISBN 978-0300188271.
- Niditch, Susan (2007). "10. Judges". In Barton, John; Muddiman, John (eds.). The Oxford Bible Commentary (first (paperback) ed.). Oxford University Press. pp. 176–191. ISBN 978-0199277186.
- Webb, Barry G. (2012). The Book of Judges. New International Commentary on the Old Testament. Eerdmans Publishing Company. ISBN 9780802826282.
- Würthwein, Ernst (1995). The Text of the Old Testament. Translated by Rhodes, Erroll F. Grand Rapids, MI: Wm. B. Eerdmans. ISBN 0-8028-0788-7.
- Younger, K. Lawson (2002). Judges and Ruth. The NIV Application Commentary. Zondervan. ISBN 978-0310206361.
