= Judges 19 =

Book of Judges, chapter 19

- ← chapter 18 chapter 20 →
- The pages containing the Book of Judges in Leningrad Codex (1008 CE)
- Book: Book of Judges
- Hebrew Bible part: Nevi'im
- Order in the Hebrew part: 2
- Category: Former Prophets
- Christian Bible part: Old Testament (Heptateuch)
- Order in the Christian part: 7

Judges 19 is the nineteenth chapter of the Book of Judges in the Old Testament or the Hebrew Bible. According to Jewish tradition, the book was attributed to the prophet Samuel; modern scholars view it as part of the Deuteronomistic History, which spans in the books of Deuteronomy to 2 Kings, attributed to nationalistic and devotedly Yahwistic writers during the time of the reformer Judean king Josiah in 7th century BCE. This chapter records the activities of a Levite from Ephraim and his concubine, belonging to a section comprising Judges 17 to 21.

== Text ==
This chapter was originally written in the Hebrew language. It is divided into 30 verses.

=== Textual witnesses ===
Some early manuscripts containing the text of this chapter in Hebrew are of the Masoretic Text tradition, which includes the Codex Cairensis (895), Aleppo Codex (10th century), and Codex Leningradensis (1008). Fragments containing parts of this chapter in Hebrew were found among the Dead Sea Scrolls including 4Q50 (4QJudg^{b}; 30 BCE – 68 CE) with extant verses 5–7.

Extant ancient manuscripts of a translation into Koine Greek known as the Septuagint (originally was made in the last few centuries BCE) include Codex Vaticanus (B; $\mathfrak{G}$^{B}; 4th century) and Codex Alexandrinus (A; $\mathfrak{G}$^{A}; 5th century). (Note: The whole book of Judges is missing from the extant Codex Sinaiticus.)

== Analysis ==
=== Double Introduction and Double Conclusion ===
Chapters 17 to 21 contain the "Double Conclusion" of the Book of Judges and form a type of inclusio together with their counterpart, the "Double Introduction", in chapters 1 to 3:6 as in the following structure of the whole book:
A. Foreign wars of subjugation with the ḥērem being applied (1:1–2:5)
B. Difficulties with foreign religious idols (2:6–3:6)
Main part: the "cycles" section(3:7–16:31)
B'. Difficulties with domestic religious idols (17:1–18:31)
A'. Domestic wars with the ḥērem being applied (19:1–21:25)

There are similar parallels between the double introduction and the double conclusion as the following:

Introduction 1 (1:1–2:5)	Conclusion 2 (19:1–21:25)
The Israelites asked the LORD, saying, "Who will be the first to go up and fight for us against the Canaanites?"; The LORD answered, "Judah is to go..." (1:1–2)	The Israelites ... inquired of God ...; "Who of us shall go first to fight against the Benjaminites?"; The LORD replied, "Judah ..." (20:18)
The story of how Othniel got his wife (1:11–15)	The story of how the remainder of the Benjaminites got their wives (21:1–25)
The Benjaminites fail to drive out the Jebusites from Jebus (1:21)	A Levite carefully avoiding the Jebusites in Jebus suffers terrible outrage in Gibeah of Benjamin (19:1–30)
Bochim: God's covenant; Israel's unlawful covenants with the Canaanites; Israel weeping before the angel (messenger) of YHWH (1:1–2)	Bethel: the ark of the covenant of God; Israel weeps and fasts before the LORD (20:26–29)
Introduction 2 (2:6–3:6)	Conclusion 1 (17:1–18:31)
The degeneration of the generations after the death of Joshua (2:6–19); God leaves certain nations "to test the Israelites to see whether they would obey the LORD's commands, which he had given... through Moses" (2:20–3:4)	A mother dedicates silver to the Lord for her son to make an idol; That son makes one of his own sons a priest in his idolatrous shrine, then replaces him with a Levite. That Levite is Moses' grandson. He and his sons become priests at Dan's shrine

The entire double conclusion is connected by the four-time repetition of a unique statement: twice in full at the beginning and the end of the double conclusion and twice in the center of the section as follows:
A. In those days there was no king...
Every man did what right in his own eyes (17:6)
B. In those days there was no king... (18:1)
B'. In those days there was no king... (19:1)
A'. In those days there was no king...
Every man did what right in his own eyes (21:25)

It also contains internal links:
Conclusion 1 (17:1–18:31): A Levite in Judah moving to the hill country of Ephraim and then on to Dan.
Conclusion 2 (19:1–21:25): A Levite in Ephraim looking for his concubine in Bethlehem in Judah.

Both sections end with a reference to Shiloh.

=== The Bethlehem Trilogy ===
Three sections of the Hebrew Bible (Old Testament)—Judges 17–18, Judges 19–21, Ruth 1–4—form a trilogy with a link to the city Bethlehem of Judah and characterized by the repetitive unique statement:

In those days there was no king in Israel; everyone did what was right in his own eyes

— Judges 17:6; 18:1; 19:1; 21:25; cf. Ruth 1:1

as in the following chart:

Judges 17–18	Judges 19–20	Ruth 1–4
A Levite of Bethlehem (17:7)	A Levite of Ephraim who took as his maiden a concubine from Bethlehem	A movement from a Moabite to David in Bethlehem (4:17-22)
Left to seek employment (17:7, 9)	Received his concubine from Bethlehem to which she had fled	A man left Bethlehem, but unlike the other two stories does not ultimately deface the town, but enhances its name
Came to a young man of Ephraim (Micah) (17:1-5, 8)	Returned to Ephraim by way of Gibeah of Benjamin	Bethlehem became the subtle setting for the birthplace of King David
Served as a private chaplain in Micah's illicit chapel (17:10-13)	Set upon by evil men who brutalized her and left her for dead	
Hired by the tribe of Dan as a priest and relocated in Laish (N. Galilee)	Her husband related the event to all of Israel (cut up)	
Established a cult center which continually caused God's people to stumble	They attacked the tribe of Benjamin almost annihilating it	
The Levite was Jonathan the son of Gershom and the grandson of Moses (18:30)	Repopulated Benjamin with women from Shiloh and Jabesh Gilead for the 600 surviving men of Benjamin	
	Jabesh-Gilead was (probably) the home of Saul's ancestors [thus his interest in it]	
	Reflects badly on Benjamin and by implication Saul—Saul's ancestors humiliated and disgraced a Bethlehemite	
	Bethlehem suffered at the hands of Benjaminites	

=== Chapters 19 to 21 ===
The section comprising Judges 19:1-21:25 has a chiastic structure of five episodes as follows:
A. The Rape of the Concubine (19:1–30)
B. ḥērem ("holy war") of Benjamin (20:1–48)
C. Problem: The Oaths-Benjamin Threatened with Extinction (21:1–5)
B'. ḥērem ("holy war") of Jabesh Gilead (21:6–14)
A'. The Rape of the Daughters of Shiloh (21:15–25)

The rape of the daughters of Shiloh is the ironic counterpoint to the rape of the Levite's concubine, with the "daughter" motif linking the two stories (Judges 19:24 and Judges 21:21), and the women becoming "doorways leading into and out of war, sources of contention and reconciliation".

== The Levite's concubine (19:1–10) ==
The setting of the story, like in chapters 17–18, the travels of Levites who often relied on the "local support and hospitality, having no patrilineal holdings of their own". A particular Levite who resided in the mountains of Ephraim married a "concubine" (a lower status than "wife") from Bethlehem in Judah. The woman left him after "she played the harlot towards him" (according to the Hebrew text; that is "being disloyal but not necessarily adulterous") or NRSV renders: "she became angry with him" (according to other manuscript traditions), going back to her father's house in Bethlehem. After four months the Levite traveled, accompanied by one servant and two donkeys, to visit and hope to win her back (verse 3; cf. Genesis 34:3). The woman brought into her house and his father-in-law received the Levite with full hospitality, even to persuade the guest to stay for four nights, a generosity that is emphasized by repetition in verses 4, 6, 8 and 5, 7, 8, 9. Finally, on the fifth morning the Levite left with his concubine and his servant, heading back north to the mountains of Ephraim (verse 10).

=== Verse 1 ===
And it came to pass in those days, when there was no king in Israel, that there was a certain Levite staying in the remote mountains of Ephraim. He took for himself a concubine from Bethlehem in Judah.

- "A certain Levite": in Hebrew, literally, "a man, a Levite".

== Gibeah's crime (19:11–30) ==
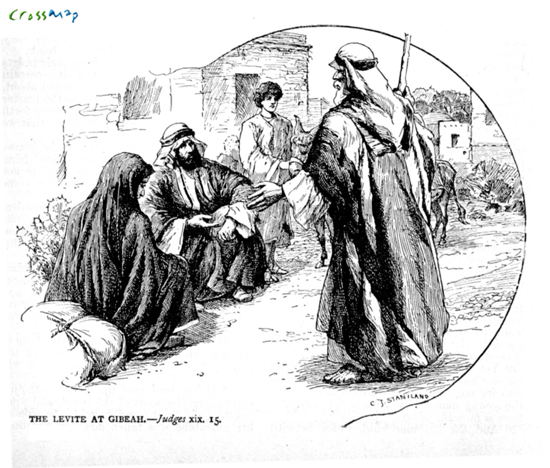
"The Levite attempts to find lodging in Gibeah", by Charles Joseph Staniland (~1900)

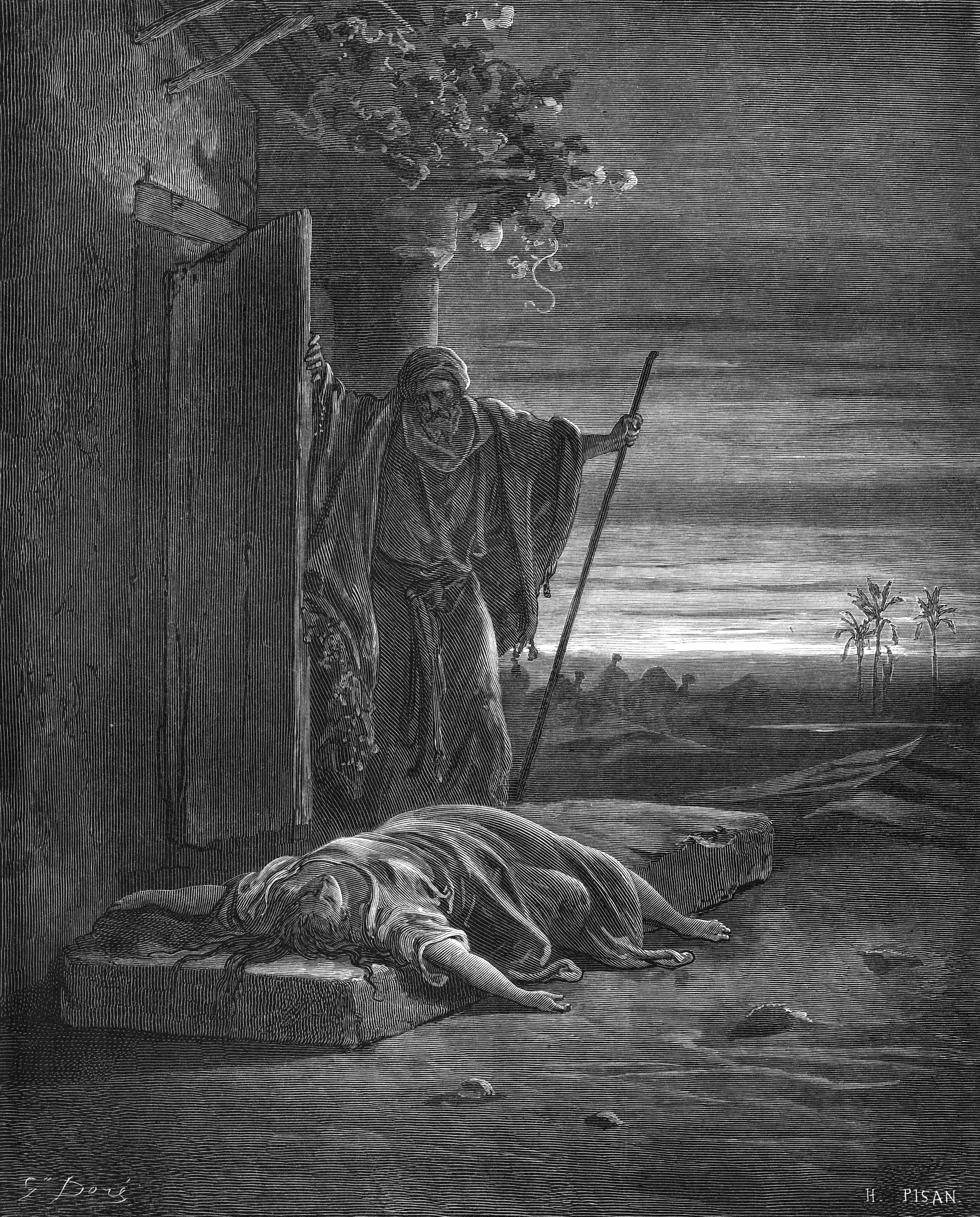
"The Levite discovers his concubine on the doorstep", by Gustave Doré, circa 1880

As the first day of travel reaching the sunset, the Levite refused his servant's advice to stop in Jebus (later: Jerusalem), a non-Israelite town, but instead suggesting they stay at a town 'of the people Israel', Gibeah of Benjamin, ironically where the outrage would take place (verses 11–15). In Gibeah, the group did not receive the expected hospitality; they were ignored for a long time in the open square, until an elderly man finally invited them to his house (verses 16–21).

Recalling a similar story about Lot in Sodom (Genesis 19), some "sons of Belial" ('base fellows', 'miscreants') came surrounding the house and demanded that the strangers be sent out to them so they might 'know them', a biblical euphemism for sexual intercourse (verses 22–26). As Lot had done (Genesis 19:8), the host attempted to appease the wild men outside by offering them his "virgin daughters" (cf. Genesis 19:8) and the Levite's concubine, but the people outside decline the offer. The Levite then acted, throwing his concubine outside to the vicious mob and locking the door (verse 25–28; cf. Judges 20:6; in contrast to a divine intervention in Genesis 19:11).

At the break of day, the victimized woman was let go, collapsing at the doorway. Later in the morning, the Levite opened the doors, ready to travel, finding the woman lying down in front of the door and giving crass and brusque orders to her to get up (verse 28). When the woman did not respond, the Levites simply placed her unconscious body on a donkey and continued the journey together. Upon returning home, the Levite cut the woman's body into twelve parts and sent each part to the twelve tribes of Israel, while asking for justice (verses 29–30, cf. 1 Samuel 11:5–8).

=== Verse 30 ===
And so it was that all who saw it said, "No such deed has been done or seen from the day that the children of Israel came up from the land of Egypt until this day. Consider it, confer, and speak up!"
- "Until this day": in the Greek Septuagint text of Codex Alexandrinus, this phrase is replaced by the following additional words:
  And he instructed the men whom he sent out, 'Thus you will say to every male Israelite: "There has never been anything like this from the day the Israelites left Egypt till the present day." '

== See also ==
- Belial
- Children of Israel
- Concubinage
- Jebusites
- Land of Israel
- Levite
- Mount Ephraim
- Ramathaim-Zophim
- Tribe of Benjamin
- Related chapters in books of the Bible:
  - Genesis 19
  - Judges 20
  - Judges 21

== Sources ==
- Chisholm, Robert B. Jr. (2009). "The Chronology of the Book of Judges: A Linguistic Clue to Solving a Pesky Problem" (PDF). Journal of the Evangelical Theological Society. 52 (2): 247–255. Archived from the original (PDF) on 2022-11-08.
- Coogan, Michael David (2007). Coogan, Michael David; Brettler, Marc Zvi; Newsom, Carol Ann; Perkins, Pheme (eds.). The New Oxford Annotated Bible with the Apocryphal/Deuterocanonical Books: New Revised Standard Version, Issue 48 (Augmented 3rd ed.). Oxford University Press. ISBN 978-0-19-528881-0.
- Fitzmyer, Joseph A. (2008). A Guide to the Dead Sea Scrolls and Related Literature. Grand Rapids, MI: William B. Eerdmans Publishing Company. ISBN 978-0-8028-6241-9.
- Halley, Henry H. (1965). Halley's Bible Handbook: an abbreviated Bible commentary (24th (revised) ed.). Zondervan Publishing House. ISBN 0-310-25720-4.
- Hayes, Christine (2015). Introduction to the Bible. Yale University Press. ISBN 978-0-300-18827-1.
- Niditch, Susan (2007). "10. Judges". In Barton, John; Muddiman, John (eds.). The Oxford Bible Commentary (first (paperback) ed.). Oxford University Press. pp. 176–191. ISBN 978-0-19-927718-6.
- Ulrich, Eugene, ed. (2010). The Biblical Qumran Scrolls: Transcriptions and Textual Variants. Brill.
- Webb, Barry G. (2012). The Book of Judges. New International Commentary on the Old Testament. Eerdmans Publishing Company. ISBN 978-0-8028-2628-2.
- Würthwein, Ernst (1995). The Text of the Old Testament. Translated by Rhodes, Erroll F. Grand Rapids, MI: Wm. B. Eerdmans. ISBN 0-8028-0788-7.
- Younger, K. Lawson (2002). Judges and Ruth. The NIV Application Commentary. Zondervan. ISBN 978-0-310-20636-1.
