= Judges 21 =

Book of Judges, chapter 21

- ← chapter 20 Ruth 1 →
- The pages containing the Book of Judges in Leningrad Codex (1008 CE).
- Book: Book of Judges
- Hebrew Bible part: Nevi'im
- Order in the Hebrew part: 2
- Category: Former Prophets
- Christian Bible part: Old Testament (Heptateuch)
- Order in the Christian part: 7

Judges 21 is the twenty-first (and final) chapter of the Book of Judges in the Old Testament or the Hebrew Bible. According to Jewish tradition the book was attributed to the prophet Samuel, but modern scholars view it as part of the Deuteronomistic History, which spans in the books of Deuteronomy to 2 Kings, attributed to nationalistic and devotedly Yahwistic writers during the time of the reformer Judean king Josiah in the 7th century BCE. This chapter records the war between the tribe of Benjamin and the other eleven tribes of Israel, belonging to a section comprising Judges 17 to 21.

== Text ==
This chapter was originally written in the Hebrew language. It is divided into 25 verses.

=== Textual witnesses ===
Some early manuscripts containing the text of this chapter in Hebrew are of the Masoretic Text tradition, which includes the Codex Cairensis (895), Aleppo Codex (10th century), and Codex Leningradensis (1008). Fragments containing parts of this chapter in Hebrew were found among the Dead Sea Scrolls including 4Q50 (4QJudg^{b}; 30 BCE–68 CE) with extant verses 12–25.

Extant ancient manuscripts of a translation into Koine Greek known as the Septuagint (originally was made in the last few centuries BCE) include Codex Vaticanus (B; $\mathfrak{G}$^{B}; 4th century) and Codex Alexandrinus (A; $\mathfrak{G}$^{A}; 5th century). (Note: The whole book of Judges is missing from the extant Codex Sinaiticus.)

== Analysis ==
=== Double Introduction and Double Conclusion ===
Chapters 17 to 21 contain the "Double Conclusion" of the Book of Judges and form a type of inclusio together with their counterpart, the "Double Introduction", in chapters 1 to 3:6 as in the following structure of the whole book:

A. Foreign wars of subjugation with the ḥērem being applied (1:1–2:5)

B. Difficulties with foreign religious idols (2:6–3:6)

Main part: the "cycles" section (3:7–16:31)

B'. Difficulties with domestic religious idols (17:1–18:31)

A'. Domestic wars with the ḥērem being applied (19:1–21:25)

There are similar parallels between the double introduction and the double conclusion as the following:

Introduction 1 (1:1–2:5)	Conclusion 2 (19:1–21:25)
The Israelites asked the LORD, saying, "Who will be the first to go up and fight for us against the Canaanites?"; The LORD answered, "Judah is to go…." (1:1–2)	The Israelites ... inquired of God ... "Who of us shall go first to fight against the Benjaminites?"; The LORD replied, "Judah…." (20:18)
The story of how Othniel got his wife (1:11–15)	The story of how the remainder of the Benjaminites got their wives (21:1–25)
The Benjaminites fail to drive out the Jebusites from Jebus (1:21)	A Levite carefully avoiding the Jebusites in Jebus suffers terrible outrage in Gibeah of Benjamin (19:1–30)
Bochim: God's covenant; Israel's unlawful covenants with the Canaanites; Israel weeping before the angel (messenger) of YHWH (1:1–2)	Bethel: the ark of the covenant of God; Israel weeps and fasts before the LORD (20:26–29)
Introduction 2 (2:6–3:6)	Conclusion 1 (17:1–18:31)
The degeneration of the generations after the death of Joshua (2:6–19); God leaves certain nations "to test the Israelites to see whether they would obey the LORD's commands, which he had given… through Moses" (2:20–3:4)	A mother dedicates silver to the Lord for her son to make an idol; That son makes one of his own sons a priest in his idolatrous shrine, then replaces him with a Levite. That Levite is Moses' grandson. He and his sons become priests at Dan's shrine

The entire double conclusion is connected by the four-time repetition of a unique statement: twice in full at the beginning and the end of the double conclusion and twice in the center of the section as follows:

A. In those days there was no king…

Every man did what right in his own eyes (17:6)

B. In those days there was no king… (18:1)
B'. In those days there was no king… (19:1)

A'. In those days there was no king…

Every man did what right in his own eyes (21:25)

It also contains internal links:

Conclusion 1 (17:1–18:31): A Levite in Judah moving to the hill country of Ephraim and then on to Dan.
Conclusion 2 (19:1–21:25): A Levite in Ephraim looking for his concubine in Bethlehem in Judah.

Both sections end with a reference to Shiloh.

=== The Bethlehem Trilogy ===
Three sections of the Hebrew Bible (Old Testament) — Judges 17–18, Judges 19–21, Ruth 1–4 — form a trilogy with a link to the city Bethlehem of Judah and characterized by the repetitive unique statement:

"In those days there was no king in Israel; everyone did what was right in his own eyes"
(Judges 17:6; 18:1; 19:1; 21:25; cf. Ruth 1:1)

as in the following chart:

Judges 17–18	Judges 19–20	Ruth 1–4
A Levite of Bethlehem (17:7)	A Levite of Ephraim who took as his maiden a concubine from Bethlehem	A movement from a Moabite to David in Bethlehem (4:17-22)
Left to seek employment (17:7, 9)	Received his concubine from Bethlehem to which she had fled	A man left Bethlehem, but unlike the other two stories does not ultimately deface the town, but enhances its name
Came to a young man of Ephraim (Micah) (17:1-5, 8)	Returned to Ephraim by way of Gibeah of Benjamin	Bethlehem became the subtle setting for the birthplace of King David
Served as a private chaplain in Micah's illicit chapel (17:10-13)	Set upon by evil men who brutalized her and left her for dead	
Hired by the tribe of Dan as a priest and relocated in Laish (N. Galilee)	Her husband related the event to all of Israel (cut up)	
Established a cult center which continually caused God's people to stumble	They attacked the tribe of Benjamin almost annihilating it	
The Levite was Jonathan the son of Gershom and the grandson of Moses (18:30)	Repopulated Benjamin with women from Shiloh and Jabesh Gilead for the 600 surviving men of Benjamin	
	Jabesh-Gilead was (probably) the home of Saul's ancestors [thus his interest in it]	
	Reflects badly on Benjamin and by implication Saul—Saul's ancestors humiliated and disgraced a Bethlehemite	
	Bethlehem suffered at the hands of Benjaminites	

=== Chapters 19 to 21 ===
The section comprising Judges 19:1-21:25 has a chiastic structure of five episodes as follows:

A. The Rape of the Concubine (19:1–30)

B. ḥērem ("holy war") of Benjamin (20:1–48)

C. Problem: The Oaths-Benjamin Threatened with Extinction (21:1–5)

B'. ḥērem ("holy war") of Jabesh Gilead (21:6–14)

A'. The Rape of the Daughters of Shiloh (21:15–25)

In particular, chapter 21 records how the Benjaminites were reintegrated into the pan-Israelite community, after they were nearly wiped out in the civil war except for the 600 men who hid in the Rock of Rimmon (last chapter). Paradoxically, the process requires another massacre against fellow Israelites and another violence of women. The rape of the daughters of Shiloh is the ironic counterpoint to the rape of the Levite's concubine, with the "daughter" motif linking the two stories (Judges 19:24 and Judges 21:21), and the women becoming 'doorways leading into and out of war, sources of contention and reconciliation'.

The structure of chapter 21 is as follows:

- The problem (21:1–4)
- An apparent solution (21:5–12)
- A further problem (21:13–18)
- The outcome (21:19–24)
- Closing refrain (21:25)

== A new problem and an apparent solution (21:1–14) ==
The war had just ended when a fresh complication appeared because the Israelites made an ill-considered oath in Mizpah (21:1; cf. 20:1) that they would not voluntarily give their daughter to the Benjaminites. During the war all the Benjaminite women have been slaughtered (20:47-48; 21:16) and because of the oath the six hundred male survivors must die childless, raising an obstacle to restore the brotherhood (21:6; cf. 20:23, 28). When the people's call to YHWH went unanswered (after they tried to put the blame on YHWH;21:3), they took actions that led to an added excessive slaughter. A search indicates that the inhabitants of Jabesh-gilead did not join the Israelites at Mizpah and the war, so hērem (holy war or "ban") was applied to that city, but with a purpose to capture their virgin women while killing the rest of the people (cf. Numbers 31), to supply brides for the surviving Benjaminites. However, only 400 virgins were available, thus not enough for the 600 men of Benjamin (verses 12, 14).

=== Verse 3 ===
And they said,

"O LORD, the God of Israel,
why has this happened in Israel,
that today there should be one tribe lacking in Israel?"

The threefold reference to "Israel" after calling YHWH ("LORD") indicates an 'oblique form of protest' to imply that this situation was God's responsibility, but God would not be drawn into it, so God remained silent.

== The rape of the daughters of Shiloh (21:15–25) ==
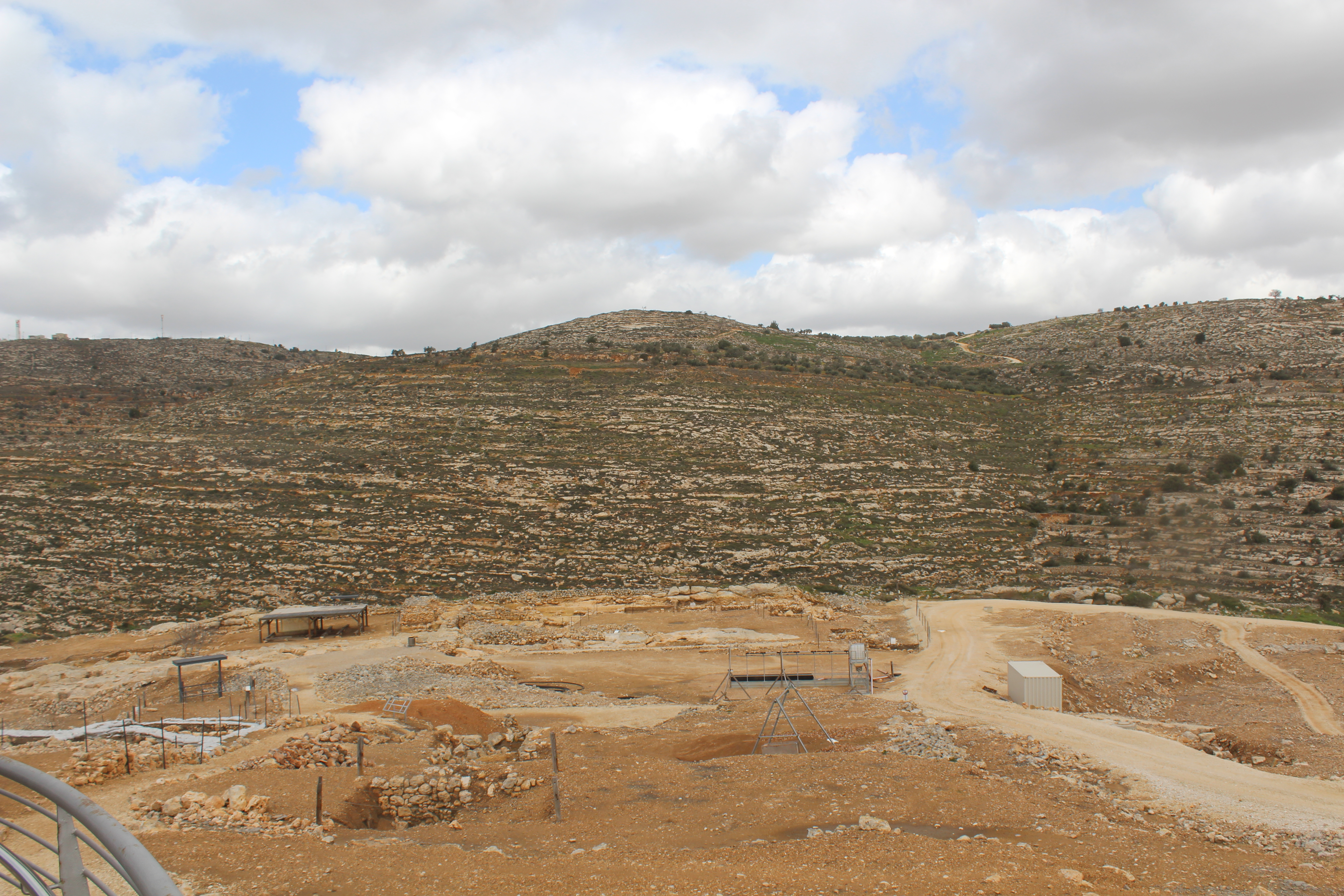
Presumed location and remains of the Tabernacle in ancient Shiloh, viewed from the Seer's Tower, Tel Shiloh. 2019

When the earlier solution did not adequately solve the problem (200 Benjaminite men were still without brides), another morally questionable plan was hatched. Still affected with the curse of the oath they have placed for whoever willingly help Benjamin as a tribe to survive (verse 18), the Israelites provided the Benjaminites an opportunity to 'engage in wife-stealing' of the young Israel virgins during their annual pilgrimage to Shiloh, linked to the story of Jephthah's daughter (Judges 11).

=== Verse 21 ===
and watch; and just when the daughters of Shiloh come out to perform their dances, then come out from the vineyards, and every man catch a wife for himself from the daughters of Shiloh; then go to the land of Benjamin.

- "To perform their dances": from Hebrew לחול במחלות, lā-khūl ba-mə-khō-lō-ṯ , "to dance in dances" (KJV).

=== Verse 25 ===
In those days there was no king in Israel: every man did that which was right in his own eyes.

This final occurrence of the refrain links the two parts of the coda (chapters 17–18 and 19–21) together. It could be seen as the final verdict of the book that the institution of judges is politically unsatisfactory, thus points forward to the Books of Samuel in which Samuel, as the last judge, anoints Saul to become the first king of Israel.

== See also ==
- Bethel
- Canaan
- Capital punishment
- Children of Israel
- Israelites
- Jabesh-Gilead
- Land of Israel
- Lebonah
- Levite
- Mizpah
- Phinehas
- Rock of Rimmon
- Shechem
- Shiloh
- Tribe of Benjamin
- Vineyard
- Related Bible parts: Judges 3, Judges 19, Judges 20

== Sources ==
- Chisholm, Robert B. Jr. (2009). "The Chronology of the Book of Judges: A Linguistic Clue to Solving a Pesky Problem" (PDF). Journal of the Evangelical Theological Society. 52 (2): 247–255. Archived from the original (PDF) on 2022-11-08.
- Coogan, Michael David (2007). Coogan, Michael David; Brettler, Marc Zvi; Newsom, Carol Ann; Perkins, Pheme (eds.). The New Oxford Annotated Bible with the Apocryphal/Deuterocanonical Books: New Revised Standard Version, Issue 48 (Augmented 3rd ed.). Oxford University Press. ISBN 978-0-19-528881-0.
- Fitzmyer, Joseph A. (2008). A Guide to the Dead Sea Scrolls and Related Literature. Grand Rapids, MI: William B. Eerdmans Publishing Company. ISBN 978-0-8028-6241-9.
- Halley, Henry H. (1965). Halley's Bible Handbook: an abbreviated Bible commentary (24th (revised) ed.). Zondervan Publishing House. ISBN 0-310-25720-4.
- Hayes, Christine (2015). Introduction to the Bible. Yale University Press. ISBN 978-0-300-18827-1.
- Niditch, Susan (2007). "10. Judges". In Barton, John; Muddiman, John (eds.). The Oxford Bible Commentary (first (paperback) ed.). Oxford University Press. pp. 176–191. ISBN 978-0-19-927718-6.
- Ulrich, Eugene, ed. (2010). The Biblical Qumran Scrolls: Transcriptions and Textual Variants. Brill.
- Webb, Barry G. (2012). The Book of Judges. New International Commentary on the Old Testament. Eerdmans Publishing Company. ISBN 978-0-8028-2628-2.
- Würthwein, Ernst (1995). The Text of the Old Testament. Translated by Rhodes, Erroll F. Grand Rapids, MI: Wm. B. Eerdmans. ISBN 0-8028-0788-7.
- Younger, K. Lawson (2002). Judges and Ruth. The NIV Application Commentary. Zondervan. ISBN 978-0-310-20636-1.
