= Micah's Idol =

Story in the Bible

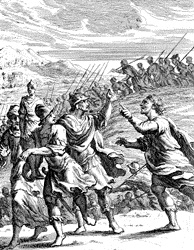
Micah and the Danites. Woodcut by Johann Christoph Weigel, 1695.

The narrative of Micah's Idol, recounted in Judges (chapters 17 and 18) concerns the Tribe of Dan, their conquest of Laish, and the sanctuary that was subsequently created there. Micah made a teraphim and other objects of piety, which were later installed at the founding of Dan city.

== Biblical account ==
The narrative, as it stands in Judges 17, states that a man named Micah, who lived in the region of the Tribe of Ephraim, possibly at Bethel, had stolen 1100 silver shekels from his mother, but when his mother cursed about it he returned them. The mother then consecrated the money to Yahweh for the purpose of creating a carved image and silver idol, and she gave 200 shekels to a silversmith who made them into a carved image and an idol. These were placed in a shrine in Micah's house, and he made an ephod and teraphim, and installed one of his sons as a priest. A young Levite, from Bethlehem in Judah, who lived near Micah (some translations render the underlying Hebrew term as sojourning, though it literally means resident alien) and was wandering the land, passed Micah's house, and so Micah asked him to be his priest, in return for 10 silver shekels a year, clothes, and food, to which the Levite agreed.

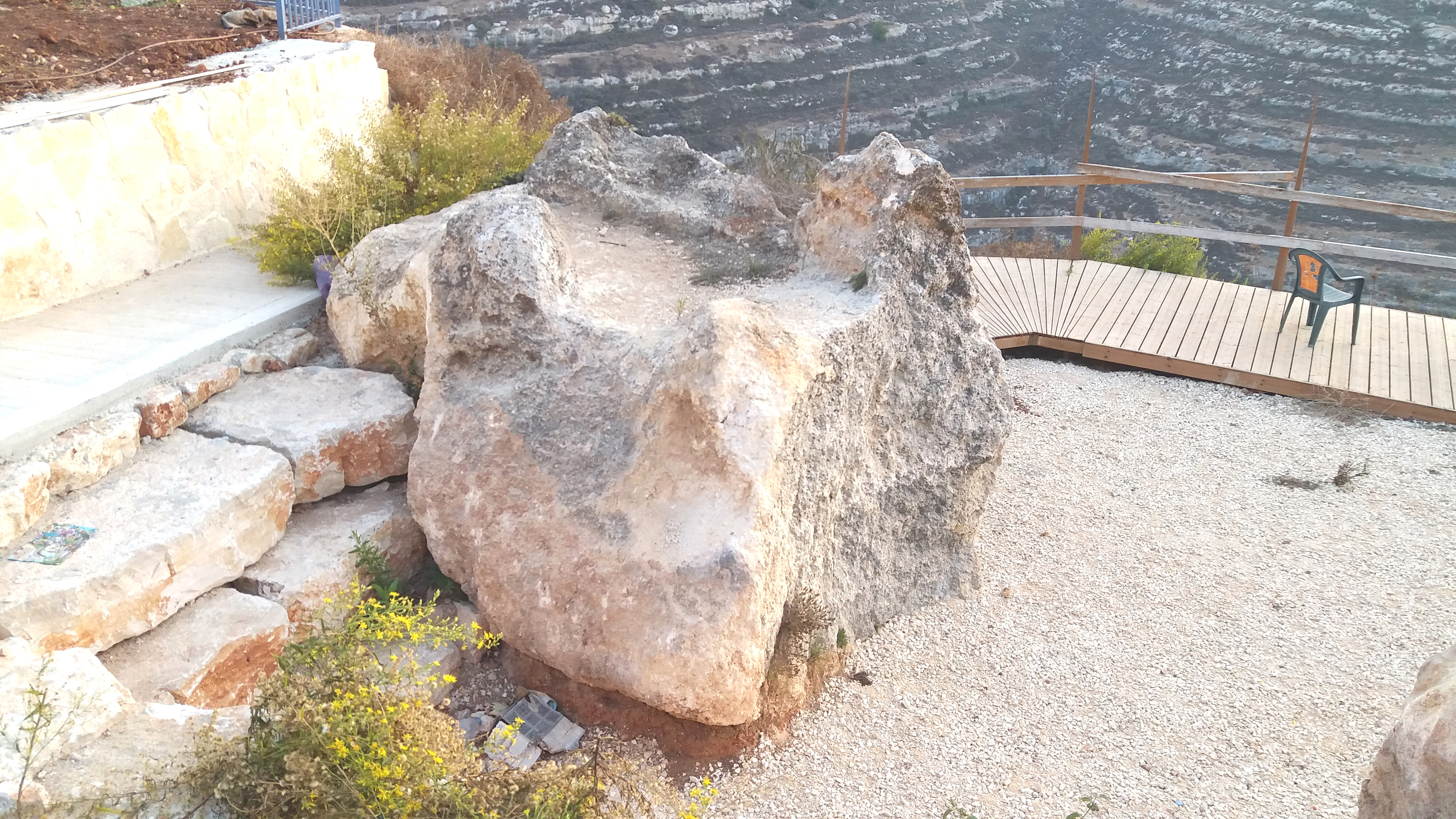
The altar of Micah. Located in the village of Givat Harel in Samaria.

The Tribe of Dan, who at this time were without territory, sent five warriors from Zorah and Eshtaol, representative of their clans, to scout out the land. In the text, when the scouts chanced upon Micah's house, they spent the night; when they chanced upon Micah's house, they recognised the Levite's voice (Biblical scholars believe this refers to recognition of his dialect or to priestly intonation), and asked him what he was doing there, so he explained. Upon return to the rest of the tribe of Dan, the scouts told them about Laish, an unmilitarised town in fertile land that was similar to the Sidonians', but was unallied as Sidon was far away. The Tribe of Dan consequently sent 600 warriors to attack Laish, and during their journey passed Micah's house, which the five scouts then told them about.

The five scouts then went into Micah's house, and stole the idol, ephod, teraphim, and carved image, and took them out of the house, while the 600 warriors were standing at the gate. The priest asked them what they were doing, but was persuaded to go with them as then he could be the priest of a whole tribe rather than just a house. When Micah discovered what had happened, he gathered his neighbours together and set off in pursuit of the warriors. When he reached them he was threatened with violence, so, realising he was outnumbered, gave up the pursuit and returned home empty-handed.

The warriors eventually reached Laish, which they put to the sword and burnt to the ground. The Tribe of Dan then rebuilt the town, named it Dan, installed the idols, and made Jonathan the son of Gershom, and his descendants, the priest. This is presumably the Levite who has featured in the story, but his name had been withheld. Gershom and his sons were priests until the captivity of the land and the idols remained in use as long as the house of God was at Shiloh. Scholars think that the captivity of the land refers to the Assyrian conquest of the Kingdom of Israel by Tiglath-pileser III in 733/732 BC, and that the house of God was at Shiloh refers to the time of Hezekiah's religious reform; an alternative possibility, however, supported by a minority of scholars, is that time of captivity of the land is a typographic error and should read time of captivity of the ark, referring to the battle of Eben-Ezer, and the Philistine capture of the Ark, and that the ceasing of the house of God being in Shiloh refers to this also.

== Textual analysis ==
The text has many doublets; Laish is described as peaceful, unmilitarised, and impractically allied to just the Sidonians in both and 18:7 and 18:27–28; it is stated that Israel had no king in both 17:6 and 18:1; the Levite begins to live with Micah in 17:11 and in 17:12. The text seemingly has contradictions. In 17:7 the Levite is a young man who lived in the neighborhood of Micah, while in the following verse he is a wandering Levite; in 18:19 the priest voluntarily goes with them, in 18:27 he is taken; in 18:30 the idols are used until the captivity of the land but in 18:31 it is until the house of God ceased to be in Shiloh. Critical scholars thus believe that the text probably was formed from two earlier spliced together narratives; the majority view being that the one of these spliced together narratives was Judges 17:1, 17:5, 17:8–11a, 17:12a, 17:13, 18:1, parts of 18:2, 18:3b, 18:4b–6, 18:8–10, parts of 18:11, 18:12, parts of 18:13, 18:14, 18:16, 18:18a, 18:19–29, and 18:31, and that the remaining verses are the other narrative.

Unsplicing these narratives, one finds that in the first narrative,

- Micah is from Ephraim, and has a shrine containing an ephod and teraphim
- Micah initially installs his son as priest
- the Levite is passing by and installed by Micah in exchange for wages, clothes, and food
- the five scouts are sent by the Tribe of Dan from Zorah and Eshatol, spend the night at Micah's house, and are blessed by the Levite
- the Levite is persuaded to join the warriors because he could then be a priest for a whole tribe
- Micah and his neighbours pursue the Danites but are dissuaded from fighting
- the Danites reach Laish, a fertile region, and weakly protected city, attack the population, and burn the city
- Laish is rebuilt and renamed Dan, and Micah's idols are used there until the house of God ceases to be in Shiloh.

In the second narrative,

- Micah stole money from his mother, and she consecrated them to Yahweh, and had a fraction of them turned into a carved image and silver idol
- The Levite lives nearby as a resident alien (the Hebrew word is however sometimes translated as sojourner, making this more similar to the first narrative)
- The Levite was like a son to Micah
- The five scouts, representative of their clans, pass Micah's house and recognise the voice of the Levite
- The scouts report back that Laish is surrounded by a fertile region, and is a weakly protected city, so the Danites decide to attack it
- The scouts take the idols from Micah while the Levite, who protests, is with the 600 warriors stood at the gate
- Once at Laish, the Tribe of Dan set up the idols, install Jonathan son of Gershom, and descendants, as priests, and this state of affairs continues until the captivity of the land

In addition, the first four verses (17:1–4) use a different form of the name Micah than the remainder of the text. Scholars think these verses have been subject to scribal corruption and are misplaced from their original order. The original order is probably that the mother first consecrated the silver to Yahweh, and only then did the son own up to the theft—the consecration of the silver likely being a ploy by the mother to get the son to own up to the theft (particularly as she only puts a fraction to the purpose it was consecrated for).

There is some debate between textual scholars as to the provenance of each narrative; among those who subscribe to Hexateuch-like theories there is even uncertainty as to whether the first narrative should be considered Elohist (or Elohist-like) or Jahwist (or Jahwist-like), and the origin of the second narrative is even more debated. Some archaeologists have suggested that the story might preserve memories of the destruction of a stratum at the site dated to c. 1000 BC. Textual scholars believe that the whole narrative is ultimately designed as a slur on the sanctuary at Dan, which became a significant sanctuary in the Kingdom of Israel, by a writer or writers who were opposed to the presence of idols there. It is notable that everyone except the people of Laish is portrayed negatively – Micah is a thief (at least in the second narrative), his mother consecrates 1100 shekels but only gives 200 of them for the purpose to which they were consecrated (again in the second narrative), the mother has molten and graven idols created (second narrative) – which violates the Mitzvot against this, the Tribe of Dan steal the idols, the Levite is disloyal (in the first narrative), and Dan brutally conquer and destroy the peaceful and unmilitarised city of Laish (in the first narrative).

== In rabbinic literature ==
Micah is variously identified in rabbinic literature; some Rabbis consider him to be identical with Sheba son of Bichri and others with Nebat, the father of Jeroboam. The rabbinical sources thus regard Micah as an appellation, and give it an etymology (not supported by modern linguists) where it means the crushed one, in reference to a haggadah narrative concerning the Biblical story of bricks without straw in the Moses cycle. In the haggadah narrative, the Israelites were so desperate to complete the task of making bricks, and simultaneously unable to do so, that they felt compelled to put their children in the brickwork where the bricks were lacking; Moses rescued one child, namely Micah, already crushed by the bricks above him, and restored him to life and health.

Classical rabbinical sources all report that Micah was among The Exodus, but some rabbinical sources state that it was believed that Micah took the idol with him from Egypt, while others argue that he only took the silver from which the idol was made. There is also a tradition that it was Micah who caused the golden calf to be made; in this tradition, Moses retrieved Joseph's coffin from the Nile by throwing a splinter with the words come up ox (comparing Joseph to an ox) into the river in the wilderness, and Micah retrieved the splinter after this, and threw it into the fire which Aaron had cast the gold into, causing a golden calf to come out.

Despite his clear idolatry, Micah was not treated as a completely negative figure, and was highly praised for his hospitality; in one rabbinical narrative, God prevents angels from casting down Micah's idol simply because of Micah's kindness. Sanhedrin 101b identified Micah with two other men:

"A Tanna taught: Nebat, Micah, and Sheba the son of Bichri are one and the same." The three interpreted signs and portents to mean that they would reign. "Three beheld but did not see."

Louis Ginzberg's classic The Legends of the Jews further mentions that Micah's mother was none other than Delilah, and that the Philistines bribed her with the 1,100 shekels for Samson's secret.

== See also ==
- Dan (ancient city)
