= Jonathan (Judges) =

Jonathan is a figure appearing in the account of Micah's Idol in the Book of Judges, in which he is appointed as the priest of a shrine; since the shrine contained an ephod and teraphim, Jonathan is referred to as an idol-worshipper by traditional Judaism. The text identifies Jonathan as the son of Gershom, son of Manasseh, but there is a scribal oddity in that the verse presents the name of Manasseh as מ^{נ}שה, with the "נ" superscripted, which does not occur elsewhere in the Bible; the correct reading may be Moses (Hebrew: משה, Moshe), and Rashi and other sages suspected as much, arguing that the name was changed to Manasseh to avoid scandalising Moses. Indeed, Gershom, Jonathan's father's name, was also the name of a son of Moses.

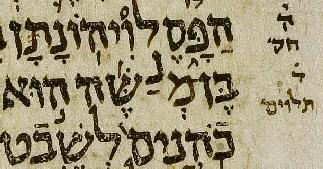
The superscripted נ in Judges 18:30
