= Baal-tamar =

Baal-tamar (“Lord of the Palm”) is a place of uncertain identification near Gibeah, mentioned the Book of Judges (Judges 20:33) in the account of the battle between the Tribe of Benjamin and the other tribes of Israel.

Eusebius (Onomastica Sacra, 238, § 75) knew Baaltamar under the name of "Beth-thamar"; but at the present day it can not be located.
