= Dan (ancient city) =

Ancient city in northern Israel

Laish, Tel Dan
- תל דן (Hebrew) تل القاضي (Arabic)
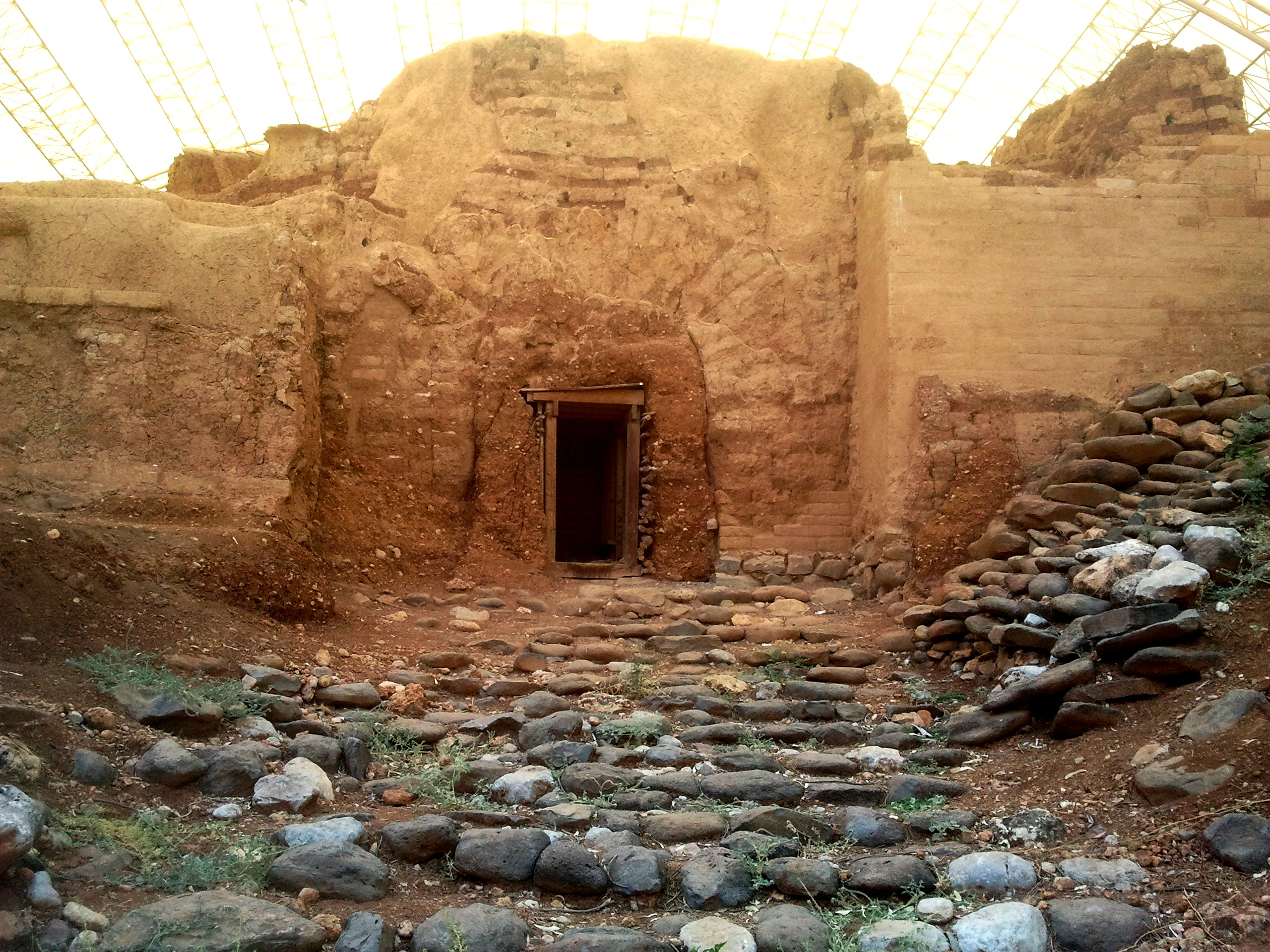
- Restored Bronze Age gate at Tel Dan

- Location within Israel Location within Eastern Mediterranean
- 33.249°N 35.652°E
- Type: conserved ruins
- Periods: Neolithic period, Bronze Age, Iron Age
- Cultures: Neolithic, Canaanite, Israelite
- Location: Israel

History
- Built: c. 4500 BC
- Abandoned: c. 733 BC

Site notes
- Public access: yes
- Website: Tel Dan Nature Reserve

Dan (Biblical Hebrew: דָּן), and older name Laish, is an ancient city mentioned in the Hebrew Bible, described as the northernmost city of the Kingdom of Israel, and belonging to the tribe of Dan, its namesake. It was later the site of a royal sanctuary built by Jeroboam.

The city is identified with a tell located in the Upper Galilee in northern Israel known as Tel Dan (תל דן) and Tel el-Qadi (Levantine Arabic: تل القاضي), literally 'Mound of the Judge', a popular translation of the Biblical name. The site was occupied continuously from the Early Bronze Age through the Iron Age II, the time of the Kingdom of Israel. While evidence suggests a period of abandonment during the Achaemenid Empire, it was later rebuilt as a Hellenistic city with a notable shrine.

== Identification and names ==
The Hebrew Bible states that prior to its conquest by the tribe of Dan the site was known as Laish with variant spellings (such as Lais) within the books of Joshua, Judges and Isaiah. In Joshua 19:47 it is called Leshem. Isaiah 10:30 has the alternative name Laishah "Lioness" in a number of translations. A Douai-Rheims translation of Judges 18:29 uses the spelling Lais.

A bilingual Koine Greek–Aramaic inscription found at the site, dating from the late 3rd or early 2nd century BCE, shows that during the Hellenistic period the site was still known by its ancient name, Dan.

Rabbinic works, and writers like Philostorgius, Theodoret, Benjamin of Tudela and Samuel ben Samson all incorrectly identified Dan or Laish with Banias. Eusebius of Caesarea more accurately places Dan-Laish in the vicinity of Banias at the fourth mile on the route to Tyre.

The Arab name of the archaeological site, Tell el-Qadi, means "the tell of the judge", offering a translation of the ancient Hebrew name. The 19th-century Swiss traveler Johann Ludwig Burckhardt (1784-1817) identified the source of the Jordan River having the name "Dhan" (Arabic: ضان, romanized: ẓān) in his travelogue, which was published posthumously in 1822. The American naval officer William F. Lynch was the first to identify Tell el-Qadi as the site of the ancient city of Dan in 1849. Three years later, Edward Robinson made the same identification, and this identification is now securely accepted.

Recent research has shown that the ancient name Dan also survived through continuous Arabic toponymy, including the hydronym Nahr al-Liddānī and the place-name Tall al-Qāḍī, attested in Ottoman tax registers, nineteenth-century maps, and local oral tradition. This evidence indicates sustained linguistic continuity rather than a purely interpretive or modern translation of the biblical name.

Tel Dan is the modern Israeli name for the site, based on the original Biblical name.

== Geography ==
Dan is situated in the Galilee Panhandle, a part of the Upper Galilee. To the west is the southern part of Mount Lebanon; to the east and north is Mount Hermon, marking the southern end of the Anti-Lebanon Mountains. Melting snow from the Mount Hermon mountain cluster provides the majority of the water of the Jordan River, and passes through Dan, making the immediate area highly fertile. The lush vegetation that results makes the area around Dan seem somewhat out of place in the otherwise arid region around it. Due to its location near the border with Syria and Lebanon in the far north of Mandatory Palestine, the site has a long and often bitterly contested modern history, most recently during the 1967 Six-Day War.

== Biblical narrative ==
=== Laish/Leshem ===
According to the Book of Judges, prior to the Tribe of Dan occupying the land, the town was known as Laish (Judges 18:7, 14, 27–29), meaning lion, or rather lioness. Joshua 19:47, although telling the same story as Judges 18, names the city as Leshem, which makes the researchers consider it as being the same place.

Laish was allied with Phoenicians from the city of Sidon. This might indicate they were also Phoenicians, who may or may not have been Canaanite. The alliance offered little practical benefit due to Laish's remoteness from Sidon and the intervening Anti-Lebanese range. The town was also isolated from Assyria and Aram by Mount Hermon; the Septuagint mentions that the town was unable to ally with the Aramaeans. The Masoretic Text does not mention the Aramaeans, but instead states that the town had no relationship with any man – textual scholars believe that this is a scribal error, with adam (man) being a mistake for Aram.

=== Israelite city of Dan ===
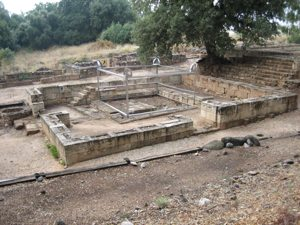
Israelite-period cultic precinct unearthed at Dan

According to the Book of Judges story of Micah's Idol, the Tribe of Dan did not at that point have any territory to their name (Judges 18:1), and so, after scouting out the land, eventually decided to attack Laish, as the land around it was fertile, and the town was demilitarised. The Bible describes the Tribe of Dan with 600 men brutally defeating the people of Laish and burning it to the ground, and then building their city in the same spot. The narrative states that Laish became known as Dan after the tribe. They then erected a sanctuary that housed the idol stolen from Micah, which was served by a priest who was Moses' grandson. The sanctuary later received one of the two golden calves of Jeroboam, and remained in use until the "time of captivity of the land" and the time that the "house of God" ceased to be in Shiloh. Scholars think that the former refers to the Assyrian conquest of the Kingdom of Israel by Tiglath-Pileser III in 733/732, and that the latter refers to the time of Hezekiah's religious reform; an alternative possibility, however, supported by a minority of scholars, is that "time of captivity of the land" is a scribal error and should read "time of captivity of the Ark", referring to the battle of Eben-Ezer, and the Philistine capture of the Ark, and that the ceasing of the "house of God" being in Shiloh refers to this also.

==== Golden calf worship ====
According to 2 Kings 10:29 and 2 Chronicles 13:8, Jeroboam erected two golden calves as gods in Bethel and Dan. Textual scholars believe that this is where the Elohist story of Aaron's golden calf originates due to opposition in some sections of Israelite society, including the Elohists, to the seeming idol-worship of Jeroboam. However, some Biblical scholars believe that Jeroboam was trying to outdo the Temple in Jerusalem, by creating a seat for God that spanned the entire Kingdom of Israel rather than just the small space above the Ark of the Covenant in Jerusalem. The Holy of Holies in the Jerusalem Temple of Judah was represented by a cherub on either side, so Jeroboam might have been using the calves to represent the sides of his sanctuary, implying his whole kingdom was equal in holiness to the Ark.

== Archaeology ==
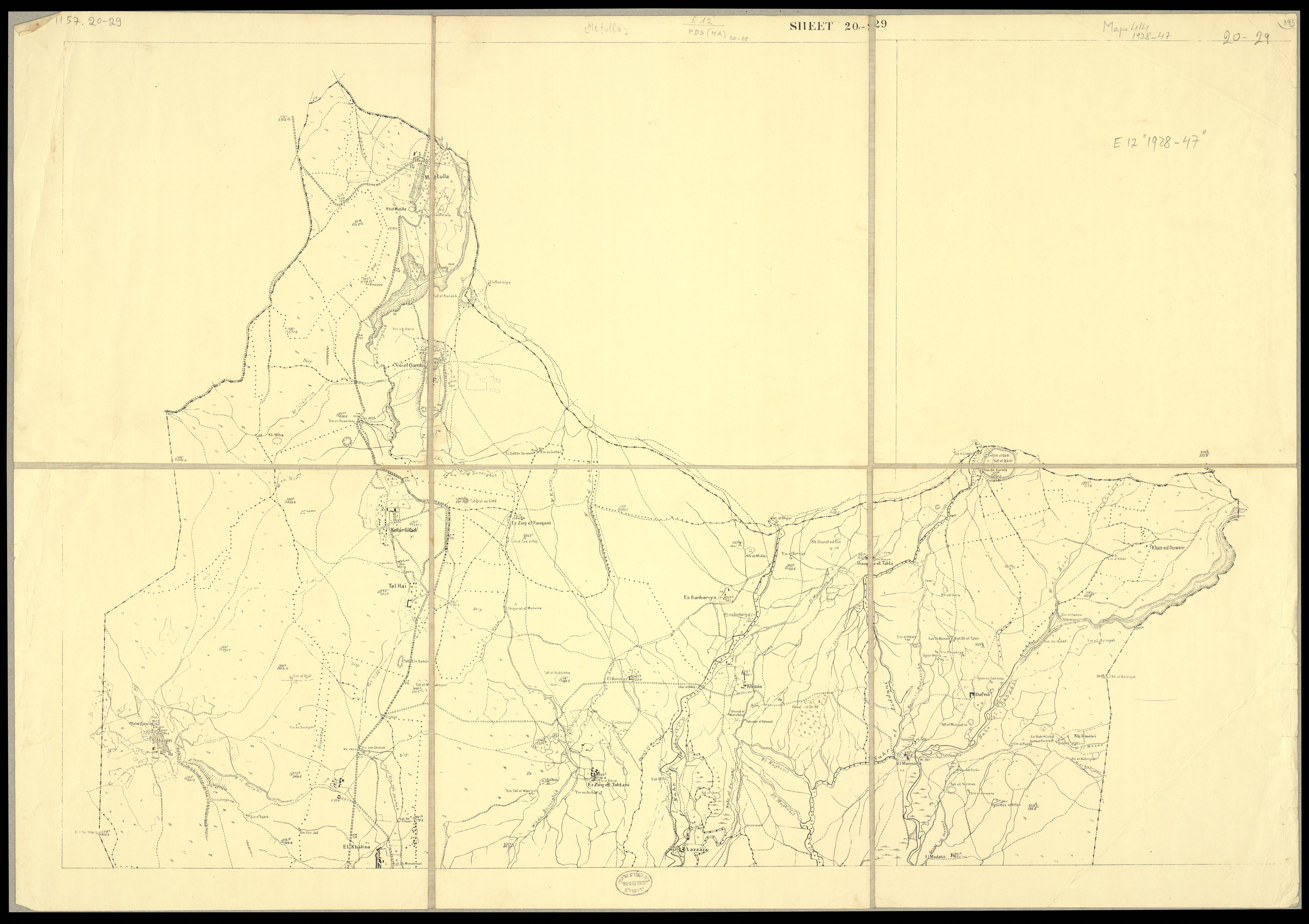
This map from the Survey of Palestine in the 1920s shows Tell el-Qadi on the top right, on the northern border of Mandatory Palestine.

According to the archaeological excavations at the site, the town was originally occupied in the Late Neolithic period (c. 4500 BCE), and at some time in the fourth millennium BCE it was abandoned for almost 1,000 years.

=== Early Bronze ===
Laish was a fortified settlement during the Early Bronze Age.

=== Middle Bronze ===
In Middle Bronze I, a settlement was established inside the existing EBA fortifications.

The Egyptians cursed Laish in execration texts written during the Middle Kingdom. It has been speculated that the repetition in such texts of formulas from older ones dating to the Old Kingdom (27th–22nd century BCE) seem to indicate that they reflected the historical reality of the Early Bronze Age, rather than that of the Middle Bronze Age.

The excavators of Tel Dan uncovered a city gate made of mud bricks on top of megalithic basalt blocks called orthostats, estimated to have been built during the Middle Bronze Age around 1750 BCE. As of 2009, its three constituent 'true' arches were the oldest complete and free-standing monumental arches made of mud-brick known in the world. Its popular name is Abraham's Gate, linked to the biblical report that Abraham travelled to Dan to rescue his nephew Lot. The gate was restored in the late 2000s and has become a popular tourist attraction.

Hazor was the regional power during the Middle Bronze II, subordinate to Qatna to the north and with trade routes to Mari in the Middle Euphrates.

Strata based on Ilan 1995:

- Stratum XII (MB I). Early XII (MB IA), late XII (MB IB).
- Stratum XI (MB II). MB IIA
- Stratum X (MB II). MB IIB
- Stratum IX (MB III). MB IIC

=== Late Bronze ===
==== Egyptian period ====
In the 15th century BCE, Tuthmosis III conquered Dan (called Laysha) along others (Egyptian hieroglyphs did not distinguish between L and R).

=== Iron Age I ===
During the Iron Age I, Egyptian withdrawal from Canaan led Laish (Dan) to become an independent entity allied with the Sidonians.

It remained independent until the 10th century BCE, when it was annexed by the Northern Kingdom of Israel or one of the Aramean kingdoms.

In Judges 18 it is told that there was no king in the land. The Tribe of Dan were seeking an inheritance for themselves, so they sent five of their clan leaders from Zorah and Eshtaol to spy out the land of Laish. The Danites then conquered Laish with an army of 600 men burning the city to the ground and rebuilding it as Dan.

=== Iron Age II ===
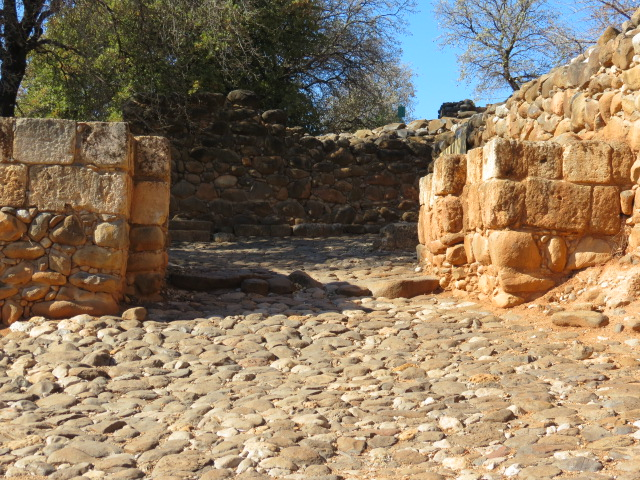
Israelite outer gate

In Iron II, the Northern Kingdom of Israel seem to have gained control over Dan.

According to William G. Dever, the city's population was approximately 3,000 people during the 9th and 8th centuries BCE.

==== Israelite city wall and gate ====
The Israelite gate was built at a different location than the Canaanite gate.

In 1992, as part of a conservation project to prepare the site for visitors, debris from the Assyrian destruction of the city by Tiglath-Pileser III was cleared from the area outside the city-gate complex. The clearance exposed a previously unknown ninth-century BCE gate forming an additional outer gate to that complex, approached across a stone-paved plaza on which stood a low stone platform. The fortifications were enlarged in the 8th century BCE under Jeroboam II before the city was destroyed by Tiglath-Pileser III. in 733/2 BCE. A hitherto unknown earlier gateway to the city was uncovered. The entrance complex led to a courtyard paved with stone with a low stone platform. In the 9th century BCE, the podium was enlarged, and major fortifications were built, a city wall with buttresses and a complex gate. The podium was enlarged further in the 8th century BCE by Jeroboam II, then destroyed by Tiglath-Pileser III.

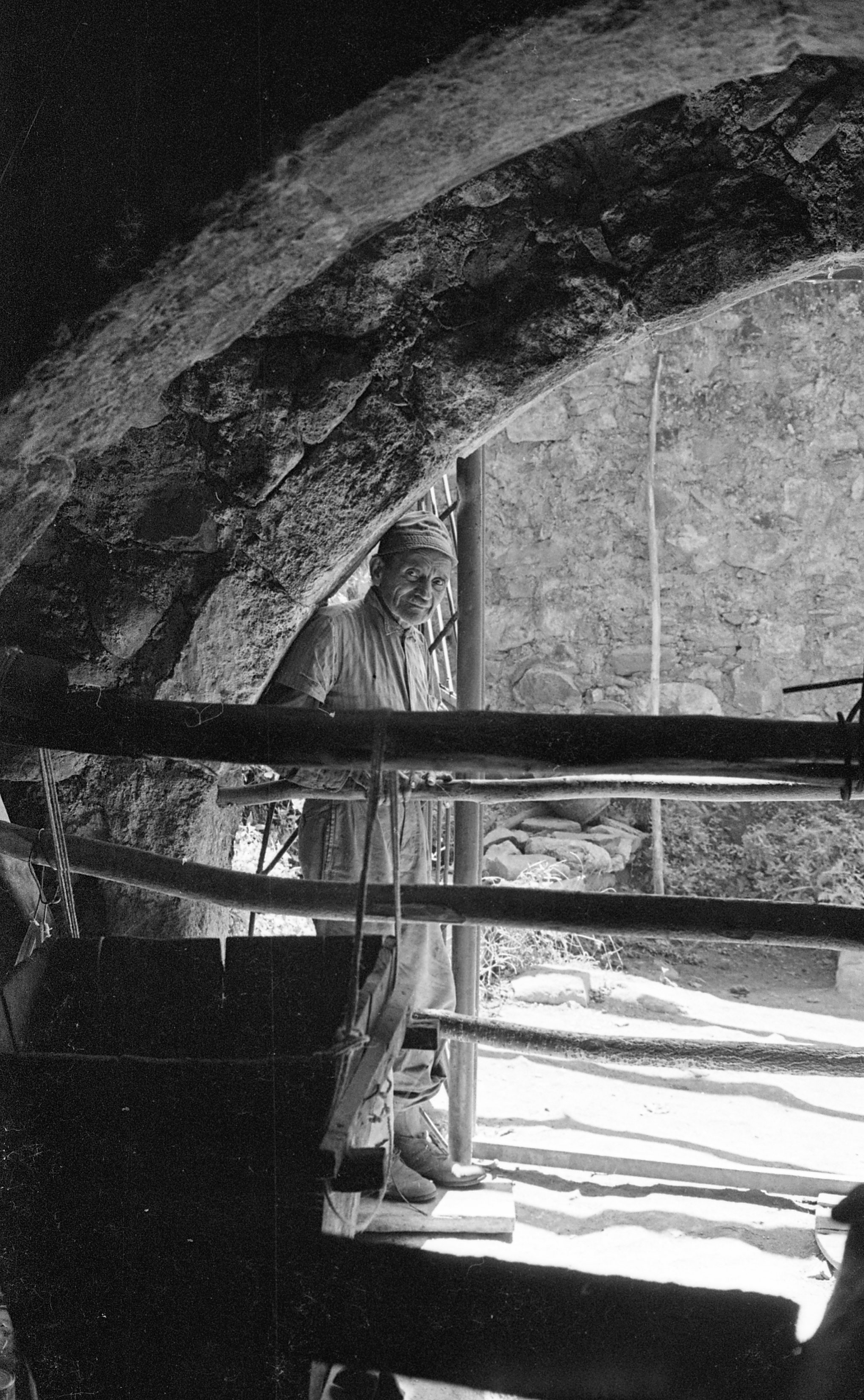
Tel Dan in 1969

==== Seat of king or judge ====
At the Israelite gate there is a raised square platform reached by two steps. Decorated stone sockets in the corners may have been created to hold canopy poles. It may have been the base of the king's seat, where he would sit in judgment.

==== Tel Dan stela ====
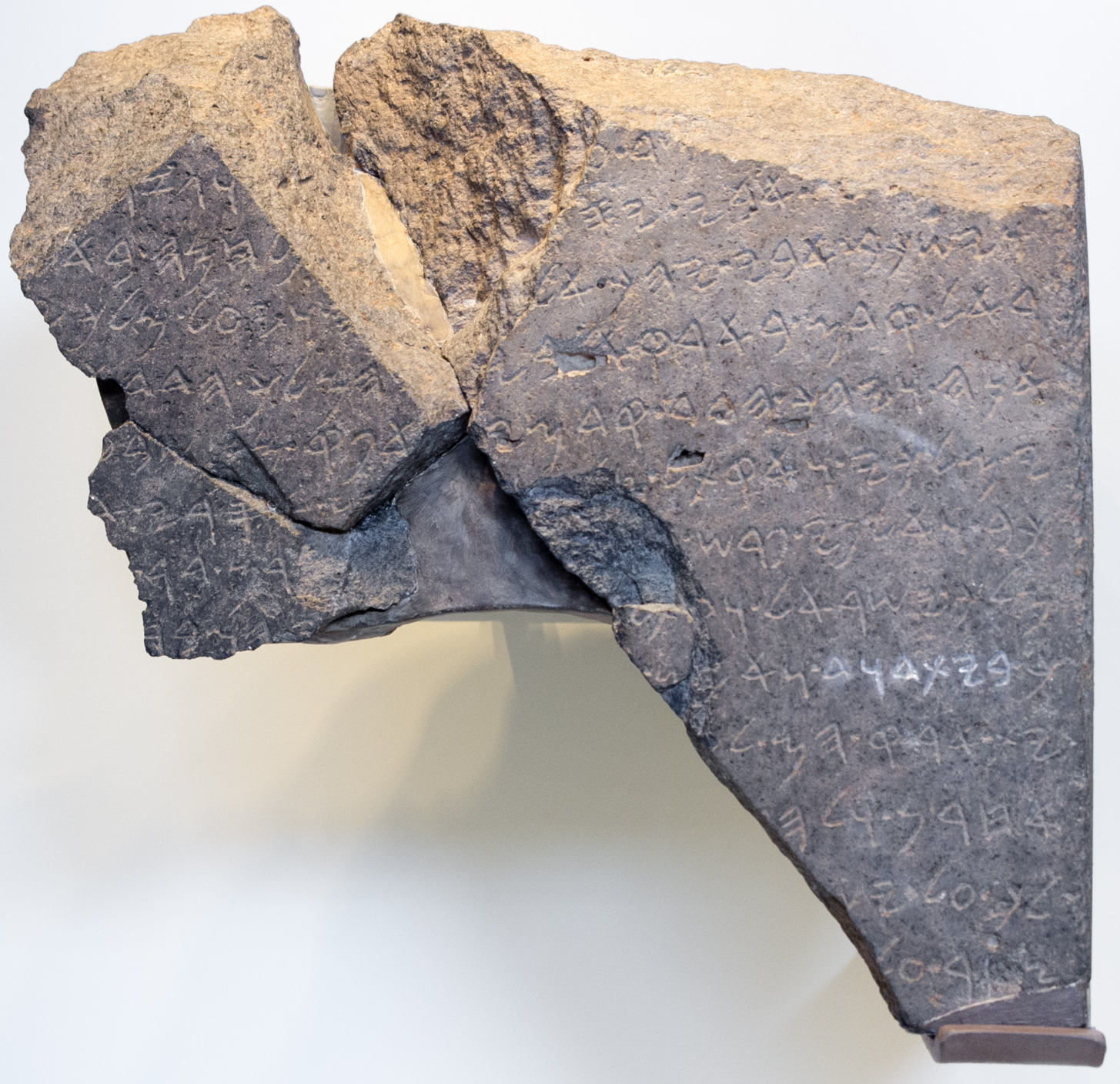
The Tel Dan stela. The Aramaic letters "BYTDWD", meaning "House of David", are highlighted.

Within the remains of the city wall, near the outer gate, parts of the stele were found. The basalt stone bears an Aramaic inscription referring to one of the kings of Damascus; the excavators of the site believe that the king it refers to is Hazael (c 840 BCE), though a minority argue that it instead refers to Ben-Hadad I (c 802 BCE). A small part of the inscription remains, with text containing the letters ביתדוד bytdwd, which most archaeologists agree means House of David.) In the line directly above, the text reads מלך ישראל mlk yšrʾl, i.e. "King of Israel". The paleo-Hebrew script in this era is vowel-less, which would make the inscription the first time that the name David has been found at an archaeological site dating before 500 BCE.

When found in 1993, the Dan stela was the first modern era artifact corroborating the biblical story of I Kings and substantiating a historical House of David beyond the biblical account. While it remains unclear whether the meaning "House of David" on the stela refers generally to a nation, also known as Judah, or to King David himself, scholars now understand that David and his son Solomom were not simply fictitious characters, as had been the school of thought prior to the discovery of the Tel Dan stela.

Dan suffered during the Aramaeans ' era of expansion because it was the closest city to them in the kingdom of Israel. The several incursions indicated by the Book of Kings suggest that Dan changed hands at least four times between the Kingdom of Israel and Aramaeans, around the time that Israel was ruled by Ahab and the Aramaeans by Ben Hadad I, and their successors. Around this time, the Tel Dan stela was created by the Aramaeans, during one of the periods of their control of Dan.

When the Neo-Assyrian Empire expanded southward, the kingdom of Israel initially became a vassal state, but after a rebellion, the Assyrians invaded and the town fell to Tiglath-Pileser III in 733/732 BCE.

==== Cultic area, altar ====
Excavations at the cultic area of Dan have revealed a religious compound with a large four-horned central altar and presenting a diverse amount of cult paraphernalia. These findings seem to be in line with the biblical account which portrays Dan as a major cultic center of the Kingdom of Israel from the reign of Jeroboam (1 Kings 12:28–30).

=== Later periods ===
During the Persian, Hellenistic, and Roman periods, remains indicate that cultic activities continued around the podium (also known as "the High Place"). One notable finds from the Hellenistic period is a bilingual dedicatory inscription (late 3rd to early 2nd century BCE) inscribed on a small limestone slab bearing three Greek lines and one Aramaic line, discovered beside the altar enclosure in the sanctuary. It reads, in essence: "To the god who is in dan, Zoilos made a vow" (Greek) and "[in] Dan, vow of Zilas to the god" (Aramaic). The formula attests that the site was still known as "Dan" in the Hellenistic period. While some have linked "the god who is in Dan" to Yahweh, the God of the Israelites, in continuation to the Israelite period activities, others argue that the formula reflects a common Phoenician practice of identifying deities by locale (e.g., "the god in X") rather than by personal name.

== Tel Dan Nature Reserve ==
The Tel Dan Nature Reserve was first declared on 39 hectares surrounding the Tel in 1974. Nine hectares were added to the reserve in 1989. The Dan River is one of the three water sources of the Jordan River which meet in the northern part of the Hula Valley. Notable points of interest include Paradise Springs, the Abraham or Canaanite Gate and the Israelite Gate.
