= Teraphim =

Hebrew term referring to household idols

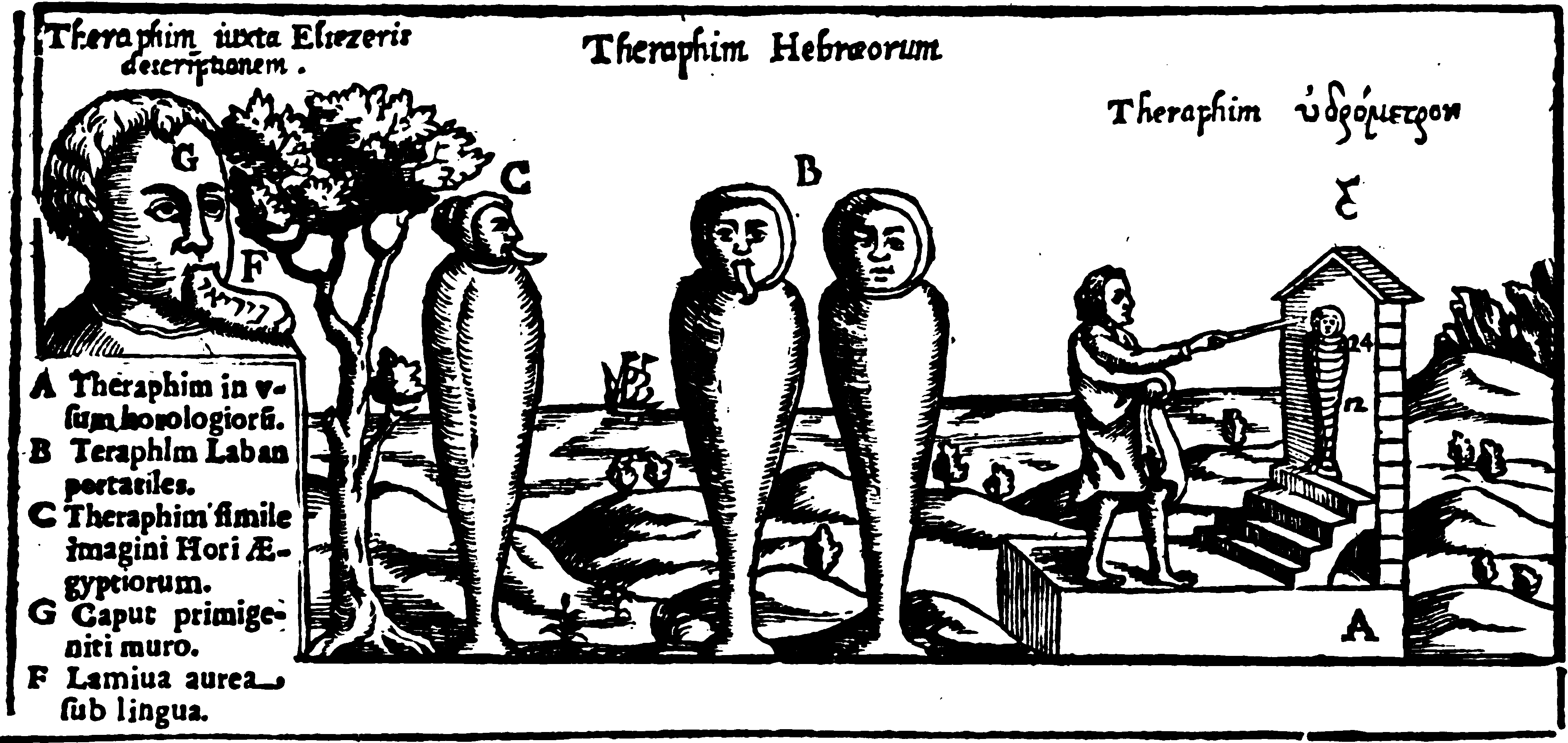
Teraphim depicted in the Oedipus Aegyptiacus (Athanasius Kircher, 1652)

Teraphim (Hebrew: תְּרָפִים, romanized: tərāfīm) is a word from the Hebrew Bible, found only in the plural, and of uncertain etymology. Despite being plural, teraphim may refer to singular objects. Teraphim is defined in classical rabbinical literature as "disgraceful things", but this is dismissed by modern etymologists. Many Bible translations into English translate it as idols or household god(s); its exact meaning in ancient times is unknown.

== Teraphim in the Hebrew Bible ==
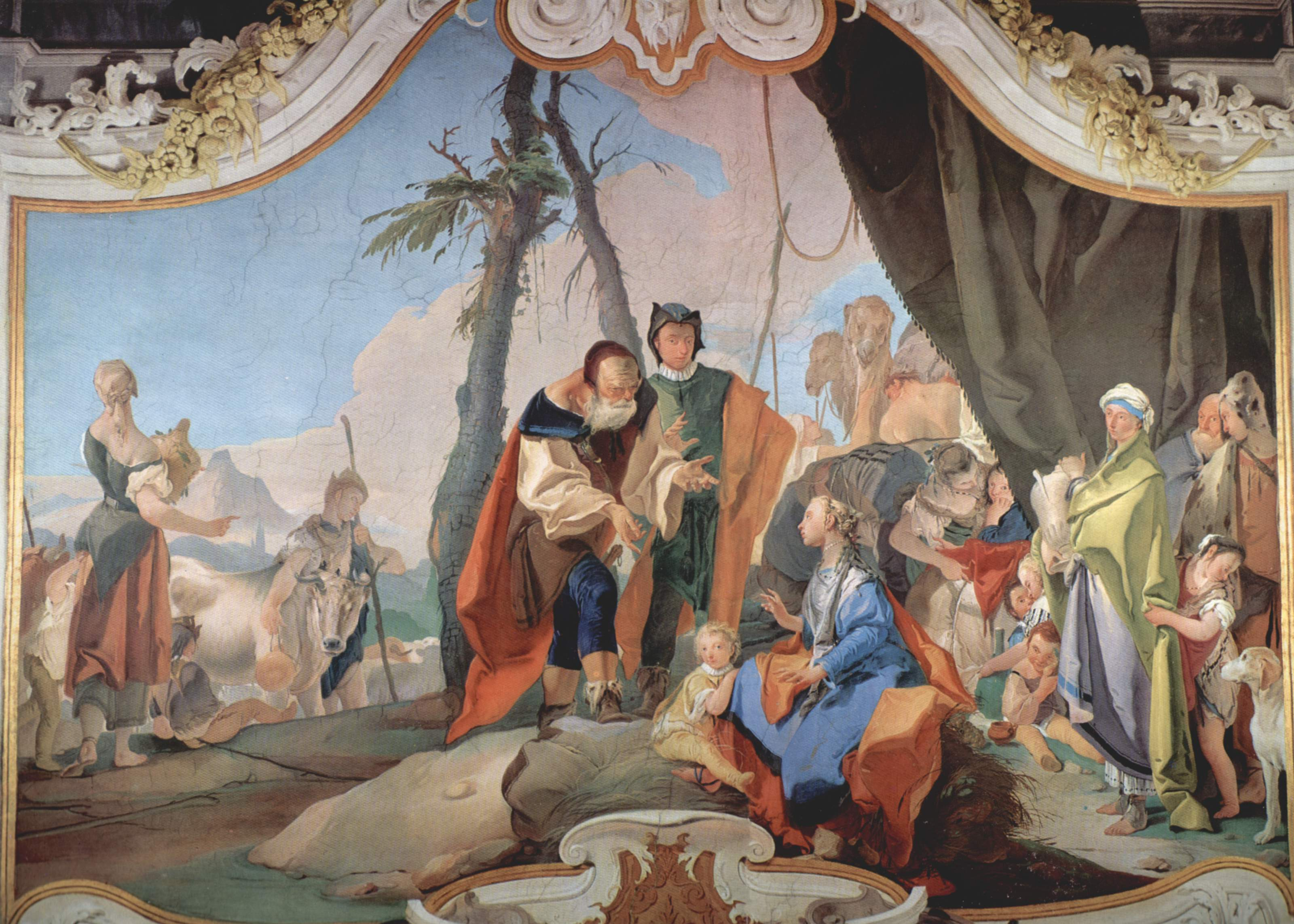
Fresco by Giovanni Battista Tiepolo of Rachel sitting on the teraphim.

There are three extended passages involving teraphim: during Rachel and Jacob's escape from Laban; with Michal's haphazard assistance of David fleeing Saul; and as the object of desire in the narrative of Micah's Idol. There are also a number of minor references to them as an element of culture or illicit religion. Polemic is wholly absent from the earlier stories.

=== Rachel ===
According to Genesis 31, when her husband Jacob escapes, Rachel takes the teraphim belonging to her father Laban and hides them on a camel's saddle. When Laban comes looking for them, she sits on them and claims that she cannot get up because she is "in the women's way", i.e., menstruating. From this it can be deduced that the teraphim were small, perhaps 30–35 cm (12–14 in).

Rachel doesn't state her reason for taking them. Some, citing the use of teraphim for divination in other Biblical passages, argue that Rachel either wanted to prevent Laban from divining the location of Jacob and herself as they fled, or she wanted to perform divination of her own. Rachel may also have intended to assert her independence from her father and her legal rights within the extended family; in ancient Middle Eastern custom, the possession of familial idols was an indicator of authority and property rights within a family.

=== Michal ===
In 1 Samuel 19, Michal helps her husband David escape from her father Saul. She lets David out through a window and then puts a teraphim in her bed to trick Saul's men, who believe it is David. This suggests that the teraphim is the size and shape of a man. Additionally, the passage refers to the teraphim, implying that teraphim were a fixture in every household. Van der Toorn claims that "there is no hint of indignation at the presence of teraphim in David's house".

However, teraphim are also referenced in 1 Samuel 15:23, in which Samuel rebukes Saul, telling him that "presumption is as iniquity and teraphim". Samuel asserts that rebellion and the use of teraphim are equally grave transgressions, thereby denouncing the latter as idolatry. Some argue that teraphim in this context refers to decorative statues, not to idolatrous ritual items.

=== Micah ===
See Micah's Idol

=== Other passages ===
Hosea 3:4 says that "the Israelites will live many days without king or prince, without sacrifice or sacred stones, without ephod or teraphim". As in the Micah story, the teraphim is closely associated with the ephod, and both are mentioned elsewhere in connection with divination; it is thus a possibility that cleromancy involved teraphim. Josiah's reform in 2 Kings 23:24 outlawed teraphim.

Zechariah 10:2 states,

For the teraphim spoke delusion,
The augurs predicted falsely;
And dreamers speak lies
And console with illusions.
That is why My people have strayed like a flock,
They suffer for lack of a shepherd.

In Ezekiel 21:21, Nebuchadrezzar uses various forms of divination to determine whether to attack Rabbah or the Kingdom of Judah first: "he shakes the arrows, he consults the images [teraphim], he looks at the liver".

== In post-biblical writing ==
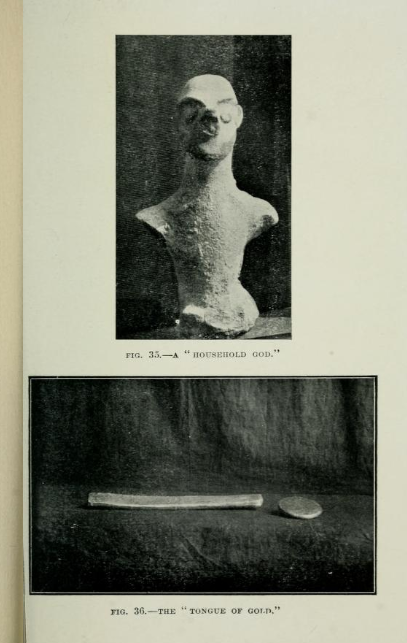
"Household god" by R A Stewart Macalister in Gezer.

Josephus mentions that there was a custom of carrying "housegods" on journeys to foreign lands, and it is thus possible that the use of teraphim continued in popular culture well into the Hellenistic period and even beyond.

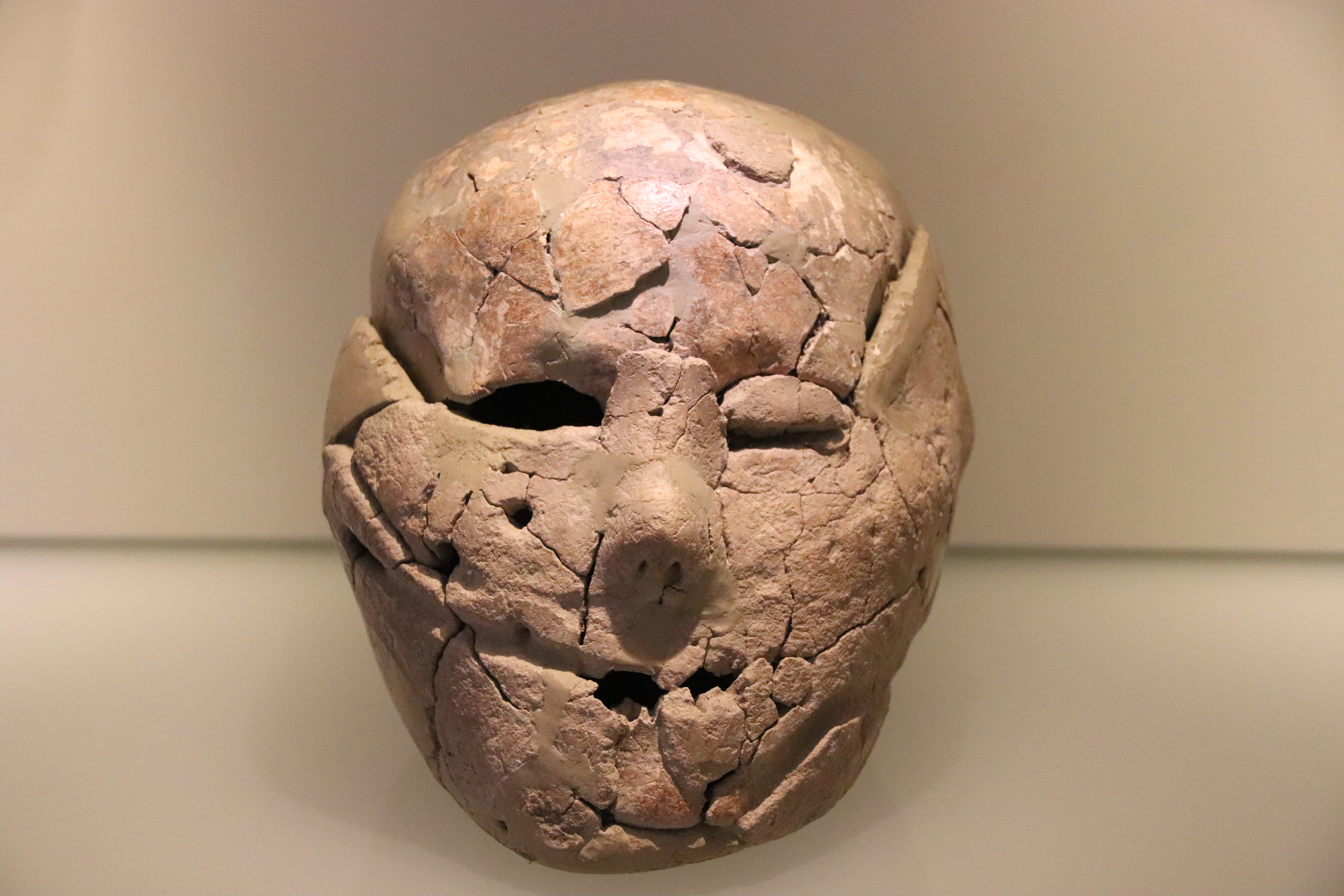
Plastered skull cultic object recovered from Baysamun.

The implied size of the teraphim, and Michal's successfully passing one off as David, has led to rabbinical conjecture that the teraphim were heads, possibly mummified. According to Targum Pseudo-Jonathan, teraphim were made from the heads of first-born men who had been slaughtered. Each head was shaved, salted, and spiced, and a golden plate with magic words engraved upon it was placed under the tongue. The head then was mounted on a wall. It was believed that the teraphim would talk. Similar descriptions are given in the writings of Eleazar of Worms and Tobiah ben Eliezer.

During the excavation of Jericho by Kathleen Kenyon, evidence of the use of plastered human skulls as cult objects was uncovered, lending credence to the rabbinical conjecture.

== Suggested meaning and use ==
Micah's usage of the teraphim as an idol, and Laban's regard of them as representing "his gods", are thought to indicate that teraphim were images of deities. Calling teraphim "elohim" is connected by some to Egyptian epigraphs which make a parallel construction of the phrase "our gods and dead". It is considered possible that teraphim originated as a fetish, possibly initially representative of ancestors, but gradually becoming oracular. Karel Van der Toorn argues that they were ancestor figurines rather than household deities, and that the "current interpretation of the teraphim as household deities suffers from a one-sided use of Mesopotamian material".

== Etymology ==
Ackerman suggests connection of the word teraphim to burial within the nachalah (נחלה) of the family, connecting threads including Bloch-Smith. "[T]he existence of the tomb constituted a physical claim to the patrimony, the נחלה".

Benno Landsberger and later, in 1968, Harry Hoffner advocated derivation from the Hittite tarpiš, 'the evil daemon'.

Casper Labuschagne claims that teraphim comes via cacophemic metathesis from the root פתר (p-t-r), 'to interpret'. Shiki-y-Michaels, in one element of an ambitious presentation, recaps some scholars' guesses: Speiser gives רפה (r-p-h), 'to be limp', also 'to sink, relax'; Albright suggests רפי (r-p-y), with the sense of 'slacken or sag'; and Pope argues רפפ (r-p-p), 'tremble'.

Labuschagne (in addition to the above) agreed with forebears who said the term teraphim was related to the Hebrew רופא (rophe), and that teraphim were healers. "Almost every characteristic that commentators have given to the teraphim (oracles, healers, gods) they have attributed to the rephaim ... who are deified ancestors" in various Semitic languages. Reducing two mysteries to one question, this solution is neat to the point of demanding caution.

== See also ==
- Di Penates
- Household deity
- Lares
- Mount Gerizim
- Plastered human skulls
- Ushabti
- Hekataion
