= Inclusio =

Literary bracketing device

In biblical studies, inclusio is a literary device similar to a refrain. It is also known as bracketing or an envelope structure or figure, and consists of the repetition of material at the beginning and end of a section of text.

The purpose of an inclusio may be structural - to alert the reader to a particularly important theme - or it may serve to show how the material within the inclusio relates to the inclusio itself. Campbell notes that the first occurrence of the repeated material may not appear to the reader as being the start of an inclusio: it is at the second occurrence the repetition might be identified: "it takes an attentive audience to keep them in mind".

== In the Hebrew Bible (the Old Testament) ==
Inclusio is one of a number of repetitive devices in Hebrew poetry, including parts of the Old Testament.

Particularly noteworthy are the many instances of inclusio in the Book of Jeremiah. A rather far-flung example of inclusio in the Book of Jeremiah can be found in its first section, chapters 1–24, which are enveloped both by a similar question in the first and last episode (1:11, 24:3), and by similar imagery—that of almond rods and baskets of figs. Inclusio may also be found between chapters 36 and 45, both of which mention Baruch ben Nerya, to whom Jeremiah's prophecies were entrusted. Bracketing can also be seen in The Lord's sayings in 1:10 and 24:6. Indeed, the whole book save for its last (52nd) chapter—which some claim was appended to it—can be thought of as inside the inclusio formed by 1:1 and 51:64, both of which mention the preaching of Jeremiah (דברי ירמיה), thus implying the lateness of chapter 52; although analyzing whether so trivial a measure has any meaning but that which appeases the eye is best left to the astute reader. None of this is to say that the shorter forms of inclusio—those in which the section enframed is quite shorter—are not found in the Book of Jeremiah. An example is found in Jeremiah 4:22, which reads:

כי אויל עמי אותי לא ידעו בנים סכלים המה ולא נבונים המה חכמים המה להרע ולהיטיב לא ידעו.

Translation:

For my people is foolish, they have not known me; they are sottish children, and they have none understanding: they are wise to do evil, but to do good they have no knowledge.

— KJV

The phrase "לא ידעו" (did not know) is found at the beginning and the end of The Lord's analysis of his people. English translations do not preserve this structure.

Inclusio also abounds in other books of the Bible. The first and last (29th) verses of Psalm 118, "הודו לה' כי-טוב כי לעולם חסדו", form an inclusio. Another, more disputed, example may be found in the Book of Ruth, where one finds a certain resemblance, if somewhat chiastic, between 1:1 and 1:22: in the former, Elimelekh leaves Bethlehem in favor of Moab, and in the latter Ruth and Naomi leave Moab in favor of Bethlehem. In the visions of the prophet Zechariah (Zechariah 1:8-6:8), an inclusio has been identified, as the whole world is at peace as the visions commence, and at the end the four spirits of heaven go out in all directions and peace is imposed on "the north country". Finally, it has been suggested that Genesis 2 contains inclusio, for the male is created at the start of the passage and the female at the end, providing textual evidence for the parallels between the two.

== In Rabbinic Literature ==
The rabbis of the Talmud were aware of occurrences of inclusio in the Bible, as shown by Rabbi Yohanan's comment in the Babylonian Talmud, Berakhot 10a that "Any psalm dear to David he opened with "Ashrei" ("happy is he) and closed with "Ashrei". Redactors of rabbinic documents frequently made use of inclusio to mark off the endpoints of literary units of different sizes and possibly to suggest conceptual connections between seemingly disparate statements. At the end of the Mishnah, tractate Kelim, Rabbi Yose explicitly notes the phenomenon: "Happy are you, Kelim, in that you opened with [statements regarding] impurity and departed with [statements regarding] purity." Tractate Berakhot, which opens with a discussion of the laws of reciting the Shema Yisrael ("Hear O Israel") passage from Deuteronomy 6:4-9, concludes with a homiletic interpretation of the second verse from this passage (v. 5), showing how the ritual recitation of the tractate's opening may serve as a source of spiritual instruction at the tractate's end. The Mishna in tractate Nazir is framed by allusions to two famous biblical Nazirites - Samson (Nazir 1:2) and Samuel (Nazir 9:5), representing respectively negative and positive exemplars of this institution.

Many chapters of Mishnah are also framed by inclusio. In the opening mishnah of Taanit, Rabbi Joshua notes that rain on the festival of Sukkot is "not a sign of blessing", and the closing mishnah of the chapter notes that rainfall after the month of Nisan is "a sign of curse". This characterization of rainfall as God's way of communicating His blessings and curses is a central theme of the chapter. Sometimes the inclusio is based on a wordplay. Ohalot Chapter 7 opens with a discussion of corpse impurity in a "nefesh atuma" ("solid monument") and closes with the statement that a baby whose head has emerged from the womb may not be killed to save the mother because "ayn dochin nefesh mipnei nefesh" ("one soul may not be set aside in favor of another"). The use of the word nefesh at the beginning and the end of the chapter in opposite meanings, symbolizing respectively death and life, emphasize the interconnection between the mysteries of birth and of death.

Examples of inclusio may be found in later rabbinic literature as well. Tosefta Makkot Chapter 3 opens and closes with statements regarding the designation of three cities of refuge. Homilies regarding Isaiah 32:20 appear at the beginning and end of tractate Bava Kamma Chapter 1. The opening homily of Leviticus Rabba 29 asserts that the fate of Adam on the day of his creation is a sign for his children annually on the same date, and the closing homily of this section asserts that when Israel observes the commandments of this day God will regard them as having been created anew. Rabbinic redactors, following in the footsteps of their biblical predecessors, continued to employ inclusio as a literary marker and tool.

== In the New Testament ==
The New Testament also uses inclusio. The main teaching part in the Sermon on the Mount starts and ends with the expression "the Law and the Prophets" (Matthew 5:17 and 7:12). Matthew's account of the first part of Jesus' public ministry is framed by an account on his teaching and his miracles (Matthew 4:23 and 9:35). Also, Matthew's Gospel begins with the prophecy that Jesus' name would be "Emmanuel, that is, 'God with us,'" (1:23, in which the author has linked Isaiah 7:14 and 8:8, 10 together) and it ends with the promise, "I am with you always, to the end of the age". This forms an inclusio about Jesus in his relationship to his people that suggests his deity. The Letter to the Hebrews uses Jeremiah's prophecy as an inclusio in 8:8-12 and 10:16-18. There are many more examples of this literary device in the New Testament.

A case of inclusio occurs in the Gospel of Mark's treatment of the "cursing of the fig tree" and the "cleansing of the Temple" (chapter 11). By giving the first half of the story before the account of the cleansing of the Temple, and the conclusion afterwards, Mark creates a "frame" which effectively highlights that he wants the cleansing of the Temple to be seen in light of the cursing of the fig tree - i.e. Jesus' actions in the Temple are not just a reform measure, but a judgment against it.

== In Latter-day Saints Scripture ==
Wording in the Second Book of Nephi, where Nephi begins and ends his writing on the "small plates", has been seen as an inclusio: the term "good" is used three times. Matthew Bowen notes that "This repetition at the opening and closing of his account constitutes a framing device sometimes called inclusio or an envelope figure".

Another example is cited in the Book of Alma where Alma the Younger teaches his son about the doctrine of the resurrection, framing the passage in chapter 40, verses 22-24 by an inclusio.

== See also ==
Chiastic structure
