= Joshua 15 =

Book of Joshua, chapter 15

- ← chapter 14 chapter 16 →
- The pages containing the Book of Joshua in Leningrad Codex (1008 CE).
- Book: Book of Joshua
- Hebrew Bible part: Nevi'im
- Order in the Hebrew part: 1
- Category: Former Prophets
- Christian Bible part: Old Testament
- Order in the Christian part: 6

Joshua 15 is the fifteenth chapter of the Book of Joshua in the Hebrew Bible or in the Old Testament of the Christian Bible. According to Jewish tradition, the book was attributed to Joshua, with additions by the high priests Eleazar and Phinehas, but modern scholars view it as part of the Deuteronomistic History, which spans the books of Deuteronomy to 2 Kings, attributed to nationalistic and devotedly Yahwistic writers during the time of the reformer Judean king Josiah in 7th century BCE. This chapter records the allotment of land for the tribe of Judah, a part of a section comprising Joshua 13:1–21:45 about the Israelites allotting the land of Canaan.

== Text ==
This chapter was originally written in the Hebrew language. It is divided into 63 verses.

=== Textual witnesses ===
Some early manuscripts containing the text of this chapter in Hebrew are of the Masoretic Text tradition, which includes the Codex Cairensis (895), Aleppo Codex (10th century), and Codex Leningradensis (1008).

Extant ancient manuscripts of a translation into Koine Greek known as the Septuagint (originally was made in the last few centuries BCE) include Codex Vaticanus (B; $\mathfrak{G}$^{B}; 4th century) and Codex Alexandrinus (A; $\mathfrak{G}$^{A}; 5th century). (Note: The whole book of Joshua is missing from the extant Codex Sinaiticus.)

== Analysis ==
Map of the land allotment of the tribes of Israel at the time of Joshua

The narrative of Israelites allotting the land of Canaan comprising verses 13:1 to 21:45 of the Book of Joshua and has the following outline:

A. Preparations for Distributing the Land (13:1-14:15)
B. The Allotment for Judah (15:1-63)

1. Judah's Boundaries (Joshua 15:1-12)
2. Achsah's Blessing (Joshua 15:13-19)
3. The Cities of Judah's Inheritance (15:20-63)

C. The Allotment for Joseph (16:1-17:18)
D. Land Distribution at Shiloh (18:1-19:51)
E. Levitical Distribution and Conclusion (20:1-21:45)

There are three key elements in the report of the allotments for the nine and a haf tribes in the land of Canaan as follows:

Tribe	Boundary List	City List	Indigenous Population Comment
Judah	X	X	X
Ephraim	X		X
Manasseh	X		X
Benjamin	X	X	
Simeon		X	
Zebulun	X		
Issachar	X		
Asher	X		
Naphtali	X	X	
Dan		X	X

== Judah's boundaries (verses 1–12) ==
Map of the land allotment of the tribes of Israel at the time of Joshua

The allotment for the tribe of Judah is recorded first and the longest among other Cisjordan tribes, consisting of a definition of its boundaries (verses 1–12), and a list of its cities (verses 20–63), with an additional insertion about the inheritance of Caleb (verses 13–19). The boundary description (15:1-12) proceeds in the order south, east, north, west. The southern boundary runs from the southern tip of the Dead Sea to the Mediterranean, including Kadesh-barnea and extending to the 'Wadi [or brook] of Egypt' (now "Wadi el-Arish"). The eastern boundary is the Dead Sea. The northern boundary is drawn carefully round the southern extremities of the city of Jerusalem (verse 8), which is still in the possession of the Jebusites. The western boundary is the Mediterranean Sea.

=== Verse 8 ===
Then the boundary goes up by the Valley of the Son of Hinnom at the southern shoulder of the Jebusite (that is, Jerusalem). And the boundary goes up to the top of the mountain that lies over against the Valley of Hinnom, on the west, at the northern end of the Valley of Rephaim.

- "Jerusalem": here is not included into Judah's territory, and Joshua 15:63 notes that Judah could not take it, whereas Joshua 18:28 assigned it to Benjamin, whose southern boundary (Joshua 18:15–19) corresponds closely to the northern boundary of Judah as outlined here. However, Judges 1:8 records that Judah took Jerusalem (likely, the areas outside the city walls) and set it on fire, while Judges 1:21 notes that the Benjaminites could not drive out the Jebusites, who still possessed Jerusalem as also noted in Judges 19:11–12, where the city is called "Jebus", with the remark, “which is Jerusalem”, and the Levite did not want to go in there, because it is a “city of the Jebusites,” “the city of a stranger.” At the end David succeeded to defeat the Jebusites, conquered Jerusalem and made it his capital over all Israel (2 Samuel 5:6–10).

== Achsah's blessing (verses 13–19) ==
Having been granted the city of Hebron by Joshua, Caleb has to fight to conquer it along with surrounding areas (could be a part of Joshua's conquest in Joshua 10:36–37). In turn, Caleb becomes a 'distributor' to grant a land to his son-in-law Othniel, because of his role in the conquest (Othniel later becomes the first 'Judge' of Israel; Judges 3:8–11), and his daughter Achsah, Othniel's wife, whose request for water reflects the condition in the drier areas of Negeb, Judah's southern desert.

== Cities of Judah (verses 20–63) ==
The long list of cities shows the extensive land of Judah, incorporating both the rich plain and the dry wilderness, especially the viticulture in the terraced slopes of the hill country and lowlands according to the blessing of Jacob to Judah (Genesis 49: 11–12). There are four distinct geographical areas of the land:

1. the Negeb (or 'extreme south', verse 21)
2. the lowlands (the Shephela, between the higher hills and the Mediterranean, verse 33)
3. the hill country (of the central ridge; verse 48)
4. the wilderness, east of the central ridge towards the Dead Sea (verse 61).

The lands close to the drier area were more suitable for sheep-rearing than agriculture, such as Carmel and Maon (verse 55) which are mentioned in the story of Nabal, a sheep-farmer who insulted David (1 Samuel 25:2).

Prominent cities mentioned in the list include such places as Adullam, Socoh, Jarmuth, Zanoah and Zorah. Keilah, Maresha, Maon, Halhul, and Timnah are also named there. The list of cities can be divided into twelve groups or districts (by the repeated phrase 'with their villages'), which was apparently still used in administering and collecting ancient taxes during the reign of King Manasseh, based on the archaeological discoveries of the city names in the fiscal bullae for tax collection in that period

Some scholars, such as Martin Noth, Frank Cross and Józef Milik, have identified Ir-melah, or the City of Salt, with the present-day archaeological site of Khirbet Qumran where the Dead Sea Scrolls were found. Although other locations have also been proposed.

The final verse (verse 63), along with other similar ones, note Israel's partial failure to take the land, despite the initial sweeping victory in Joshua 1–12, especially chapters 11–12.

== See also ==
- Ahiman
- Anak
- Jordan River
- Jebusite
- Kadesh-barnea
- Kenaz
- Kenezite
- Kirjatharba
- Sheshai
- Talmai
- Tribal allotments of Israel
- Tribe of Judah
- Valley of Hinnom (Gehenna)
- Related Bible parts: Joshua 11; Joshua 12, Joshua 14, Judges 1, Judges 19

== Sources ==
- Beal, Lissa M. Wray (2019). Longman, Tremper III; McKnight, Scot (eds.). Joshua. The Story of God Bible Commentary. Zondervan Academic. ISBN 978-0310490838.
- Coogan, Michael David (2007). Coogan, Michael David; Brettler, Marc Zvi; Newsom, Carol Ann; Perkins, Pheme (eds.). The New Oxford Annotated Bible with the Apocryphal/Deuterocanonical Books: New Revised Standard Version, Issue 48 (Augmented 3rd ed.). Oxford University Press. ISBN 978-0195288810.
- Firth, David G. (2021). Joshua: Evangelical Biblical Theology Commentary. Evangelical Biblical Theology Commentary (EBTC) (illustrated ed.). Lexham Press. ISBN 9781683594406.
- Fitzmyer, Joseph A. (2008). A Guide to the Dead Sea Scrolls and Related Literature. Grand Rapids, MI: William B. Eerdmans Publishing Company. ISBN 9780802862419.
- Halley, Henry H. (1965). Halley's Bible Handbook: an abbreviated Bible commentary (24th (revised) ed.). Zondervan Publishing House. ISBN 0-310-25720-4.
- Harstad, Adolph L. (2004). Joshua. Concordia Publishing House. ISBN 978-0570063193.
- Hayes, Christine (2015). Introduction to the Bible. Yale University Press. ISBN 978-0300188271.
- Hubbard, Robert L (2009). Joshua. The NIV Application Commentary. Zondervan. ISBN 978-0310209348.
- McConville, Gordon (2007). "9. Joshua". In Barton, John; Muddiman, John (eds.). The Oxford Bible Commentary (first (paperback) ed.). Oxford University Press. pp. 158–176. ISBN 978-0199277186.
- Rösel, Hartmut N. (2011). Joshua. Historical commentary on the Old Testament. Vol. 6 (illustrated ed.). Peeters. ISBN 978-9042925922.
- Ulrich, Eugene, ed. (2010). The Biblical Qumran Scrolls: Transcriptions and Textual Variants. Brill.
- Webb, Barry G. (2012). The Book of Judges. New International Commentary on the Old Testament. Eerdmans Publishing Company. ISBN 9780802826282.
- Würthwein, Ernst (1995). The Text of the Old Testament. Translated by Rhodes, Erroll F. Grand Rapids, MI: Wm. B. Eerdmans. ISBN 0-8028-0788-7.
