= List of women in the Bible =

The following is a list of women found in the Hebrew and Christian Bibles.

== Old Testament ==
Name	Description	Appearances
Abigail	Mother of Amasa, Sister of David	I Chronicles 2:15–17
Abigail	Wife of the wicked Nabal, who became a wife of David after Nabal's death.	I Samuel 25
Abihail	wife of Abishur and mother of Ahban and Molid.	I Chronicles
Abihail	wife of king Rehoboam	II Chronicles
Abishag	companion of aged King David.	I Kings
Abital	one of King David's wives	II Samuel; I Chronicles
Achsah	daughter of Caleb. When Caleb promised her to Othniel in marriage, she requested that he increased her dowry to include not only land, but springs of water as well.	Joshua, Judges, I Chronicles
Adah	wife of Lamech	Genesis
Adah	daughter of Elon, the Hittite and one of the wives of Esau. Possibly original name of Bashemath.	Genesis
Ahinoam	wife of King Saul, mother of Michal (wife of King David)	I Samuel
Ahinoam	one of King David's wives, mother of Amnon.	I Samuel; II Samuel; I Chronicles
Aholibamah (or Oholibamah)	Daughter of Anah and one of Esau's wives. Also called Judith.	Genesis
Asenath	Egyptian wife of Joseph.	Genesis
Asherah	Consort of God (wife of El). Associated with Baal.	[Judges 3:7; 1 Kings 18:19; 2 Kings 23:4]
Ashtoreth (or Astarte)	Ancient Near Eastern goddess	Judges, 1 Kings, and 2 Kings
Atarah	second wife of Jerahmeel.	I Chronicles
Athaliah	Queen of Judah during the reign of King Jehoram, and later became sole ruler of Judah for five years.	II Kings, II Chronicles
Azubah	Caleb's wife.	I Chronicles
Azubah	wife of King Asa, 3rd king of Judah, and mother of Jehoshaphat.	I Kings, II Chronicles
Baara	Moabitess, wife of Shaharaim.	I Chronicles
Basemeth	daughter of Elon, the Hittite, One of the wives of Esau.	Genesis
Basemeth	daughter of Ishmael and 3rd wife of Esau.	Genesis
Basemeth	daughter of Solomon, wife of Ahimaaz.	I Kings
Bathsheba	wife of Uriah the Hittite and later of David, king of the United Kingdom of Israel and Judah. She was the mother of Solomon, who succeeded David as king.	II Samuel, I Kings, I Chronicles
Bilhah	Rachel's handmaid and a concubine of Jacob who bears him two sons, Dan and Naphtali.	Genesis
Bithiah	Pharaoh's daughter (Exodus). Also identified with/as Asiya in Muslim interpretations. Wife of Mered, a descendant of Judah.	1 Chronicles 4
Cozbi	A Midianite princess who was killed by Phinehas (grandson of Aaron) because her evil influence was seen as the source of a plague among the Israelites. The incident was then taken as a pretext for the War against the Midianites in Numbers 31.	Numbers 25
Deborah	Nursemaid to Rebekah and later to Jacob and Esau.	Genesis 35
Deborah	Prophetess and the fourth, and the only female, Judge of pre–monarchic Israel in the Old Testament.	Judges 4
Delilah	The "woman in the valley of Sorek" who Samson loved.	Judges
Dinah	Daughter of Jacob, one of the patriarchs of the Israelites and Leah, his first wife.	Genesis
Eglah	One of King David's wives.	II Samuel, I Chronicles
Elisheba	Wife of Aaron.	Exodus
Ephah	one of the concubines of Caleb (prince of Judah)	I Chronicles
Ephrath	Second wife of Caleb (the spy)	I Chronicles
Esther	Queen of the Persian Empire in the Hebrew Bible, the queen of Ahasuerus.	Esther
Eve	First woman, wife of Adam.	Genesis
Gomer	Wife of Hosea and a prostitute.	Hosea
Hadassah	Esther's Hebrew name, before she changed it to conceal her identity and became the queen of Persia and second wife of Ahasuerus.	Esther
Hagar	Egyptian handmaiden of Sarah, wife of Abraham. Hagar became the mother of one of Abraham's sons, Ishmael.	Genesis
Haggith	Wife of King David, mother of Adoniyah	II Samuel, I Kings, I Chronicles
Hammolekheth	possibly ruled over portions of Gilead.	I Chronicles
Hamutal	Wife of Josiah and mother of "ungodly" sons Jehoahaz and Mattaniah.	II Kings, Jeremiah
Hannah	A worshipper at Jerusalem. Mother of Samuel.	I Samuel
Hazzelelponi	daughter of Etam, tribe of Judah	I Chronicles
Helah	One of the wives of Asshur	I Chronicles
Hephziba	Wife of King Hezekiah and mother of Manasseh, who undid Hezekiah's good works.	II Kings
Hodesh	one of the wives of Shaharaim	I Chronicles
Hodiah's wife		I Chronicles
Hogla	One of the five daughters of Zelophehad who were given the right to inherit their deceased father's property.	Numbers, Joshua
Huldah	Prophetess	II Kings, II Chronicles
Hushim	One of the wives of Shaharaim	I Chronicles
Iscah	Daughter of Abraham's younger brother Haran	Genesis
Jael	Heroine who killed Sisera to deliver Israel from the troops of king Jabin. She was the wife of Heber the Kenite.	Judges
Jecholiah (or Jecoliah)	Wife of Amaziah (King of Judah) and mother of Uzziah.	II Kings, II Chronicles
Jedidah	Wife of wicked king Manessah and mother of Josiah.	II Kings
Jehoaddan (or Jehoaddin)	Wife of king Joash and mother of king Amaziah of Judah	II Kings, II Chronicles
Jehosheba (or Jehoshebeath/Josaba)	Daughter of Jehoram and wife of Jehoiada. She saved her nephew Jehoash from massacre.	II Kings
Jemima	One of Job's daughters.	Job
Jerioth	Wife of Caleb (son of Hezron)	I Chronicles
Jerusha	Daughter of Zadok, a priest, wife of King Uzziah and mother of Jotham.	II Kings, I Chronicles, II Chronicles
Jezebel	Queen of ancient Israel.	I Kings, II Kings
Jochebed	Mother of Moses, Aaron, and Miriam.	Exodus, Numbers
Judith	Hittite wife of Esau.	Genesis
Judith	heroine of the deuterocanonical Book of Judith	Book of Judith
Keren–Happuch	One of Job's daughters.	Job
Keturah	Wife of Abraham after Sarah's death.	Genesis, I Chronicles
Keziah	Second daughter of Job.	Job
Leah	First wife of Jacob who was given to him in place of Rachel whom he loved.	Genesis, Ruth
Lo–Ruhamah	Daughter of Hosea and Gomer.	Hosea
Maacah (or Maakah)	the daughter of King Talmi of Geshur, was married to King David and bore him his son Absalom.	2 Samuel 3:3
Maacah	2nd wife of King Rehoboam. Mother of Abijah, Attai, Ziza and Shelomith. Rehoboam loved Maacah more than any other of his wives or concubines.	II Chronicles
Maacah	Sister of Makir, father of Gilead. Mentioned one verse later is Makir's wife, also named Maacah.	I Chronicles
Mahalath	daughter of Ishmael and 3rd wife of Esau.	Genesis
Mahalath	granddaughter of David and the first wife of King Rehoboam.	II Chronicles
Mahlah	one of the daughters of Zelophehad	Numbers, Joshua
Mahlah	A Gileadite	I Chronicles
Matred	Mother of Mehetabel, daughter of Me-zahab	Genesis, I Chronicles
Unnamed Witch of Endor	Witch, Medium or Oracle of Endor	1 Samuel 28
Mehetabel	daughter of Matred.	Genesis; I Chronicles
Merab	King Saul's oldest daughter.	I Samuel
Me-Zahab	Mother of Matred	"Genesis, I Chronicles"
Michal	daughter of Saul and wife of David.	I Samuel, II Samuel, I Chronicles
Milcah	wife of Nahor and daughter of Haran.	Genesis
Milcah	one of the daughters of Zelophehad.	Numbers, Joshua
Miriam	Sister of Moses.	Exodus, Numbers, Deuteronomy, I Chronicles
Miriam	woman of Judah.	I Chronicles
Unnamed	mother of King Lemuel that gave him the prophetic instruction	Proverbs 31
Naamah	Sister of Tubal-cain.	Genesis
Naamah	Mother of King Rehoboam.	II Chronicles
Naarah	wife of Asher, tribe of Judah.	I Chronicles
Naomi	mother–in–law to Ruth.	Ruth
Noa	daughter of Zelophehad.	Numbers
Noadiah	prophetess.	Nehemiah
Orpah	Sister-in-law to Ruth.	Ruth
Peninnah	Wife of Elkanah.	I Samuel
Puah	one of two midwives who saved the Hebrew boys.	Exodus
Rachel	second wife of Jacob, and sister of Leah. Mother of Joseph and Benjamin.	Genesis, I Samuel, Jeremiah, Matthew
Rahab	of Jericho.	Joshua, Matthew, Hebrews, James
Rebekah	wife of Isaac and the mother of Jacob and Esau.	Genesis, Romans
Reumah	concubine of Abraham's brother Nahor.	Genesis
Rizpah	daughter of Aiah and one of the concubines of King Saul.	II Samuel
Ruth	Boaz and Ruth get married and have a son named Obed. Obed is the descendant of Perez the son of Judah, and the grandfather of (king) David.	Ruth, Matthew
Sarah or Sarai	wife of Abraham and the mother of Isaac. God changed her name to Sarah as part of a covenant with Yahweh after Hagar bore Abraham a son Ishmael.	Genesis, Isaiah, Romans, Galatians, Hebrews, I Peter
Sarah	wife of Tobias.	Tobit
Serah	daughter of Asher.	Genesis
Sheerah	founded three towns. Descendant of Ephraim.	I Chronicles
Shelomit	mother of blasphemer.	Leviticus
Shelomit	daughter of Zerubbabel, sister of Meshullam and Hananiah.	I Chronicles
Shiphrah	one of two midwives who saved the Hebrew boys.	Exodus
Shua	daughter of Heber	1 Chronicles 7
Susanna	a woman who was nearly sentenced to death due to false adultery accusations before being saved by Daniel.	Daniel
Tahpenes	an Egyptian queen	I Kings
Tamar	daughter-in-law of Judah, as well as the mother of two of his children, the twins Zerah and Perez.	Genesis
Tamar	daughter of King David, and sister of Absalom. Her mother was Maacah, daughter of Talmai, king of Geshur.	II Samuel
Tamar	daughter of David's son Absalom.	II Samuel
Taphath	daughter of Solomon	I Kings
Tharbis	according to Josephus, a Cushite princess who married Moses prior to his marriage to Zipporah as told in the Book of Exodus. This name is not found in the Bible, and there is debate on if "the Kushite" refers to Zipporah herself or a second woman (Tharbis).	
Timnah (or Timna)	concubine of Eliphaz and mother of Amalek.	Genesis
Tirzah	one of the daughters of Zelophehad.	Numbers, Joshua
Vashti	queen, and wife of King Ahasuerus.	Esther
Zibiah	mother of Joash	2 Kings 12:1 and 2 Chronicles 24:1
Zeresh	wife of Haman.	Esther
Zeruiah	daughter or stepdaughter of Jesse of the Tribe of Judah, was an older sister of King David. Zeruiah had three sons, Abishai, Joab, and Asahel, all of whom were soldiers in David's army.	II Samuel, I Chronicles
Zillah	wife of Lamech and the mother of Tubal-cain and Naamah.	Genesis
Zilpah	Leah's handmaid who becomes a wife of Jacob and bears him two sons Gad and Asher.	Genesis
Zipporah	wife of Moses, daughter of Jethro.	Exodus
Unnamed, Zuleika	Potiphar's wife and Asenath's mother. Asenath married Joseph, so she is the grandmother of Ephraim and Manasseh (Tribe of Joseph).	Genesis 39:5–20

== New Testament ==
Name	Description	Appearances
Apphia		Philemon 1:2
Anna the Prophetess	A prophetess and widow who worshiped God through prayer and fasting.	Luke
Berenice	The oldest daughter of King Agrippa I, and sister of King Agrippa II, with whom she lived after her husband Herod, king of Chalcis, died. She and King Agrippa II listened to the Apostle Paul's defense before he was transferred to Rome for an appeal to Caesar.	Acts 25:13-26:32
Candace (or Kandake)	Ethiopian queen; a eunuch under her authority and in charge of her treasury was witnessed to by Philip the Evangelist, led to God and baptized.	Acts
Chief and Honorable Women of the Greeks	Women in the temple who refused to be persuaded by Paul and Silas.	Acts 17:4, 12
Certain woman of the company	A woman from the crowd who raised her voice to Jesus with blessings for his mother Mary.	Luke 11:27-28
Certain women who had been healed	Women who traveled with and provided for Jesus out of their own resources– Mary Magdelene, Joanna, wife of Chuza, Susanna, and other unnamed women.	Luke 8:2-3
Chloe	Leading early Christian woman in Corinth.	1 Corinthians 1:11
Claudia	greeted by Paul the Apostle.	2 Timothy
Damaris	An Athenian women who converted to Christianity.	Acts
Daughter of the Syrophenician Woman	A young girl with a demon or unclean spirit, whose mother approached Jesus to request healing for her daughter.	Mark 7:24-30 and Matthew 15:21-28
Devout and Honorable Jewish Women	The devout women were of high standing and leading men were incited by the Jews to drive Paul and Barnabus out of the area.	Acts 13:50
Dorcas	Woman in the early Christian Church known for her charity. Resurrected by the apostle Peter.	Acts 9:36-42
Drusilla	The wife of governor Felix and Jewish princess daughter of Herod Agrippa I.	Acts 24:24
Elizabeth	Mother of John the Baptist and cousin to Mary the mother of Jesus.	Luke
Eunice	mother of Timothy	2 Timothy
Euodia	Christian of the church in Philippi	Philippians
Female Servants to whom Peter denied Christ	The women who questioned and confronted Peter about his affiliation with Jesus Christ, to whom he denied each time they inquired, as Jesus had predicted.	John 18:17, Luke 22:56-57, Mark:14:66-68, 69-70, and Matthew 26:69,71
Four Daughters of Philip	Daughters had the gift of Prophecy. As young girls, they may have been informants of Luke. .Philip's daughters Most popular is Hermione	Acts 21:9
Herodias	Granddaughter of Herod the Great and mother of Salome; married her uncle Herod II (or Philip), divorced him to marry his half brother Herod Antipas.	Matthew 14:1-11 Mark 6:17-28; Luke 3:19-20
Jezebel	false prophetess.	Revelation
Joanna	One of the women who went to prepare Jesus' body for burial, and was informed by two men in shining garments that Jesus had risen. She was the wife of Cuza, a house-steward of Herod the Tetrarch. In Luke 8, she is listed as one of the women who had been healed either of an infirmity or an evil spirit, and who ministered to Jesus out of her resources.	Luke 8:1-3; 24:1-10
Julia	Julia is one of the first century Christian women who receive a special greeting from the apostle Paul at the close of the epistle to the Romans. She is Romans 16:15 alongside Philologus, Nereus and his sister, Olympus, and “all the saints with them.” Some have suggested that the names listed in verse 15 are those of a family, Julia being the wife of Philologus and the mother of Nereus and his sister, who may have hosted a house-church.	Romans 16:15
Junia	Listed alongside Andronicus. Among those whom Paul greets at the close of the epistle to the Romans in Chapter 16. Uniquely, the author notes that Andronicus and Junia were (1) kinsfolk of Paul, (2) imprisoned alongside Paul, (3) “prominent among the apostles”, and (4) “in Christ” before him. This makes Junia the only female apostle named in the New Testament	
Lois	grandmother of Saint Timothy.	II Timothy
Lydia of Thyatira	the first converted believer after the resurrection, and the first to introduce it in to her household. She was a successful business woman and she was pivotal to the spread of the name of Jesus.	Acts
Many women beholding a far off	Many women that travelled with them and provided for them. Three were named–Mary Magdeline, Mary the mother of James and Joseph, and the mother of Zebodee. (Many wiki pages on The Marys)	Matt 27:55-56; mark 15: 40-41
Many women who came up to Jerusalem with Jesus from Galilee	Unnamed women who were in Jerusalem with Jesus at the time of his crucifixion	Mark15:40-41
Martha	Sister of Mary and Lazarus.	Luke, John
Mary	Mother of Jesus.	Matthew, Mark, Luke, John, Acts, Galatians
Mary	The mother of James and Joses (or Joseph).	Matthew, Mark, and Luke
Mary	the mother of John Mark	Acts Colossians 4:10
Mary	the sister of Martha.	Luke, John
Mary	the wife of Cleophas and Jesus' Mother's sister	John 19:25
Mary of Rome	Mary of Rome was a first century Christian woman, named among those Paul the apostle greets at the close of the epistle to the Romans, of whom the author writes, “who has worked very hard among you” (Rom. 16:6, NRSV).	Romans 16:6
Mary Magdalene	Disciple of Jesus	Matthew, Mark, Luke, John
Mother of the Man born blind	Was questioned, along with her husband, by the Pharisees about their son's healing.	John 9:2-3, 18-23
The Mother of Peter's Wife	Each synoptic Gospel (Matthew, Mark, Luke) reports Jesus healing his student Peter's wife's mother.	Matthew 8:14-15; Mark 1:30-31; Luke 4:38-39
Mother of Rufus	This unnamed woman, is mentioned alongside her son, Rufus, both of whom are among the first century Christians who are specifically greeted by the apostle Paul in the close of the epistle to the Romans. The Mother of Rufus is affectionately noted as having been a surrogate mother or mother figure to Paul.	Romans 16:13
Mother of Zebedee's children	This unnamed woman met with Jesus and advocated for her sons James and John to sit at Jesus' right and left hands when he comes into his kingdom. She was also one of the women from Galilee who followed Jesus to Jerusalem and observed the crucifixion from a distance.	Matthew 20:20-23; Matthew 27:56
New Women Believers	These believers were added to the Lord, men and women.	Acts 5: 14
Other women at the empty tomb	The women (Mary Magdalene, Joanna, Mary, the mother of James, and other women) were the first to proclaim the resurrection of Jesus to the disciples.	Luke 24:1-11, 22-24
Paul's sister	This unnamed woman's son overheard a plot to kill Paul and passed it on to Paul and eventually to the tribune.	Acts 23:16
Persis	Persis is a first century Christian woman who is one of the believers greeted by Paul the Apostle at the close of the epistle to the Romans. She is noted as a “dear friend” of the apostle, and a woman who “has worked very hard in the Lord.”	Romans 16:12
Phoebe	A first century Christian woman, Phoebe was commended by the apostle Paul to the believers in Rome, and named as a deacon (Greek diakonos) and a patron or benefactor (Greek prostatis) of the apostle and many others. Some scholars believe that it was Phoebe who Paul entrusted to deliver the epistle to the Romans, a Christian community he had not yet met. (Romans 16:1-2)	Romans
Priscilla	wife of Aquila, and missionary partner to Paul the Apostle.	Acts, Romans, I Corinthians, II Timothy
Rhoda	Servant in the house of Mary, mother of John Mark. Her testimony about Peter was not believed at first.	Acts
Salome	Daughter of Herodias. Persuaded Herod to have John the Baptist beheaded.	Matthew, Mark
Salome	a follower of Jesus present at His crucifixion as well as the empty tomb.	Mark
Unnamed, later Photini (or Photine)	Samaritan woman at the well	John
Samaritan Woman at the well	Jesus broke social barriers by asking a Samaritan woman for a drink of water from the well. Jesus, the Messiah, in turn offers the woman "living water."	John 4:7-42
Samaritan women baptized by Philip	Part of the crowd listening to Philip preach in Samaria.	Acts 8:12
Sapphira	Sapphira and her husband, Ananias, were land owners and lied about a donation from selling property. Both died suddenly.	Acts 5:1-11
Sister of Nereus	This unnamed woman is listed alongside her brother Nereus in the final greetings from Paul to first century Christians in the epistle to the Romans. Some have suggested that Nereus and his sister are the children of Philologus and Julia who may have hosted a house-church noted as “all the saints with them.”	Romans 16:15
Susanna	A follower of Jesus.	Luke
Syntyche	Christian of the church in Philippi mentioned with Euodia	Philippians
Syrophenician Woman (Woman of Canaan)	A woman who requested that Jesus heal her daughter from a demon.	Mark 7:24-30 and Matthew 15:21-28
Tabitha or Dorcas	Tabitha was always doing good and helping the poor.	Acts 9:36-42
Tryphena and Tryphosa	Tryphosa is a recipient of greetings from Paul in the final chapter of the epistle to the Romans. Tryphena and Tryphosa, both women, are celebrated as “hard workers in the Lord.”	Romans 16:12
Widow of Nain	Widow who received an unexpected miracle from Jesus when he raised her son from the dead.	Luke 7:11-17
Wife of Pontius Pilate	Pilate's wife persuades Pilate not to proceed with the crucifixion of Jesus.	Matthew 27:19
Wives and children of Tyre	Jezebel is mentioned by name as the daughter of Ithobaal of Tyre mentioned in the Old Testament.	Acts 21:4-6
Women at the Place of Prayer in Philippi	Women gathered in place of prayer. The women were unnamed except for Lydia	Acts 16:13)
Woman who anointed Jesus	The woman who took a costly alabaster jar of ointment and poured it on Jesus' head as a sign of preparation for his coming burial.	John 12:1-8, Mark 14:3-9, and Matthew 26:6-13
Women who bewailed and lamented	Unnamed women who were "beating their breast and wailing" (NRSV) at Jesus' crucifixion. Jesus turned and instructed them to cry rather for themselves and their children because of the future difficulties that would be coming for them.	Luke 23:27-29
Women who followed Jesus	Unnamed women who followed Jesus from Galilee and observed the crucifixion from a distance. They also observed where his body was laid in the tomb and went and prepared spices for Jesus' burial.	Luke 23:49, 55-56
Widows who were neglected	The widows of the Hebrews were neglected in the daily distribution of food. It was determined it was against God’s will to neglect people	Acts 6:1
Women and the Apostles	Women were gathered with the Apostles in prayer and supplication.	Acts 1:14
Women committed to prison by Paul	Unnamed women who were dragged off from their houses and imprisoned by Paul	Acts 8:3; 22:4
Women brought bound to Jerusalem	Unnamed women who were apprehended by Paul for being followers of "the Way." They were brought bound to Jerusalem, presumably for trial and punishment.	Acts 9:2
Widow with Two Mites	Widow who Jesus observed putting all of her resources into the Temple treasury, compared to those who put in out of their abundance.	Luke 21:1-4 and Mark 12:41-44
Unnamed, girl with spirit of divination	Female slave who had a spirit of divination whose owners made a great deal of money off her.	Acts 16:16-19
Unnamed, Sinner who washed Jesus' feet with her hair	As Jesus visited the home of one of the Pharisees, a woman brought an alabaster jar of ointment, and bathed his feet with her tears, dried them with her hair, and then anointed them with the ointment. While the Pharisee was shocked that Jesus allowed a sinner to provide such treatment to him, Jesus pronounced that her service to him displayed her faith and pronounced her sins forgiven.	Luke 7:36-50
Unnamed, Woman with the issue of blood	Suffered from the constant issue of blood for twelve years, but received a miraculous healing by touching the hem of Jesus' garment.	Luke 8:43-48, Mark 5:25-34, and Matthew 9:20-22
Unnamed, Woman Taken in Adultery	Scribes and Pharisees bring a woman caught in act of adultery to Jesus and ask if according to the Law of Moses, the woman should be stoned. An account of Jesus knowing that he was being tricked. Under the Roman occupation, the Jews were not allowed to carry out the Jewish law. The Pharisees' motive was to trick Jesus into breaking the law of the land and not about moral correction. So Jesus made them give up their plan by pointing to their sins.	John 8:1-11
Woman with spirit of infirmity of 18 years	Woman with health challenge that caused her to bend over and unable to stand up. Jesus heals her on the Sabbath day.	Luke 13:11-17

== See also ==
- List of minor biblical figures
- List of names for the biblical nameless
- Female disciples of Jesus
