= Joshua 14 =

Book of Joshua, chapter 14

- ← chapter 13 chapter 15 →
- The pages containing the Book of Joshua in Leningrad Codex (1008 CE).
- Book: Book of Joshua
- Hebrew Bible part: Nevi'im
- Order in the Hebrew part: 1
- Category: Former Prophets
- Christian Bible part: Old Testament
- Order in the Christian part: 6

Joshua 14 is the fourteenth chapter of the Book of Joshua in the Hebrew Bible or in the Old Testament of the Christian Bible. According to Jewish tradition the book was attributed to Joshua, with additions by the high priests Eleazar and Phinehas, but modern scholars view it as part of the Deuteronomistic History, which spans the books of Deuteronomy to 2 Kings, attributed to nationalistic and devotedly Yahwistic writers during the time of the reformer Judean king Josiah in 7th century BCE. This chapter records the preparation for the allotment of land and the inheritance for Caleb, a part of a section comprising Joshua 13:1–21:45 about the Israelites allotting the land of Canaan.

== Text ==
This chapter was originally written in the Hebrew language. It is divided into 15 verses.

=== Textual witnesses ===
Some early manuscripts containing the text of this chapter in Hebrew are of the Masoretic Text tradition, which includes the Codex Cairensis (895), Aleppo Codex (10th century), and Codex Leningradensis (1008).

Extant ancient manuscripts of a translation into Koine Greek known as the Septuagint (originally was made in the last few centuries BCE) include Codex Vaticanus (B; $\mathfrak{G}$^{B}; 4th century) and Codex Alexandrinus (A; $\mathfrak{G}$^{A}; 5th century). (Note: The whole book of Joshua is missing from the extant Codex Sinaiticus.)

== Analysis ==
The narrative of Israelites allotting the land of Canaan comprising verses 13:1 to 21:45 of the Book of Joshua and has the following outline:

A. Preparations for Distributing the Land (13:1-14:15)

1. Joshua Directed to Distribute the West Jordan Inheritance (13:1-7)
2. The East Jordan Inheritance (13:8-33)

a. The East Jordan (13:8-14)
b. Reuben (13:15-23)
c. Gad (13:24-28)
d. East Manasseh (13:29-31)
e. Summary (13:32-33)

3. Summary of the West Jordan Inheritance (14:1-5)
4. Caleb's Inheritance (14:6-15)

B. The Allotment for Judah (15:1-63)
C. The Allotment for Joseph (16:1-17:18)
D. Land Distribution at Shiloh (18:1-19:51)
E. Levitical Distribution and Conclusion (20:1-21:45)

== Summary of the West Jordan inheritance (14:1–5) ==
Map of the land allotment of the tribes of Israel at the time of Joshua

The allocation of the land in Cisjordan (west of the Jordan River) was done by Joshua together with Eleazar the priest and tribal chiefs (verses 1) as a direct continuation of Numbers 26, which records the census taken under the leadership of Moses and Eleazar precisely for this distribution (Numbers 26:1–4, 52–56; cf Numbers 32:28). The sacred lot was used as commanded in Numbers 26:55. The explanation for the exclusion of the Levites from land inheritance, and the dividing of the tribe of Joseph (as tribes of Ephraim and Manasseh), are additional to the information in Numbers 26.

=== Verse 1 ===
And these are the countries which the children of Israel inherited in the land of Canaan, which Eleazar the priest, and Joshua the son of Nun, and the heads of the fathers of the tribes of the children of Israel, distributed for inheritance to them.

- "Eleazar the priest": the son of Aaron, is mentioned here for the first time in the Book of Joshua, and named before Joshua (although Joshua was told to divide the land in Joshua 13:7), just as how it was listed in Numbers 34:17. The combination of Eleazar, Joshua and the heads of the families is mentioned again in Joshua 19:51 after the division of the land is completed. Eleazar and Joshua were the principal figures in the allotment of the land is supported by the fact that the daughters of Zelophehad approached them to claim their inheritance (Joshua 17:4).
- "Heads of the fathers of the tribes": a term also used in Numbers 32:28, whereas Numbers 34:18 uses the term "prince". The ten persons, one from each of the nine tribes and the half tribe of Manasseh, which were appointed and named by God in Numbers 34:19–29 to "divide the inheritance among the children of Israel in the land of Canaan", as follows:

Tribe	Leader
Judah	Caleb the son of Jephunneh
Simeon	Shemuel the son of Ammihud
Benjamin	Elidad the son of Chislon
Dan	Bukki the son of Jogli
Joseph - Manasseh	Hanniel the son of Ephod
Joseph - Ephraim	Kemuel the son of Shiphtan
Zebulun	Elizaphan the son of Parnach
Issachar	Paltiel the son of Azzan
Asher	Ahihud the son of Shelomi
Naphtali	Pedahel the son of Ammihud

== Caleb's inheritance (14:6–15) ==
Before the allotment for the tribe of Judah, a special grant of land is given to Caleb, who (with Joshua) had dissented from the bad report of first spies (Numbers 13:30–33; cf. Numbers 32:12), and thus for his faithfulness was promised a possession of his own (Numbers 14:24; Deuteronomy 1:36). The land Caleb requested was in the area of Hebron (verse 12), within the territory soon to be allotted to Caleb's tribe of Judah. In his speech of the request Caleb emphasized his vigor into old age (cf Moses; Deuteronomy 34:7), as also a part of the promise to him (Numbers 26:65), because of his trust in YHWH, that he was not afraid of the Anakim, the gigantic people who scared Israel at first (verse 12; cf. Numbers 13:22, 28, 32–33).

=== Verse 10 ===
And now, behold, the LORD has kept me alive, just as he said, these forty-five years since the time that the LORD spoke this word to Moses, while Israel walked in the wilderness. And now, behold, I am this day eighty-five years old.

A time calculation is embedded in this verse: Caleb the son of Jephunneh was 40 years old when he received the promise (after coming back as one of the 12 spies; verse 7), and 45 years have passed since then, so he is 85 years old at this time. According to Sebachim 118b, the promise in Kadesh-barnea was given 2 years after the Exodus from Egypt, so within 40 years of wandering, 38 years have passed until the crossing into Canaan (Deuteronomy 2:14). Therefore, now (45 years after the promise) seven years have passed which comprise the period of the conquest of Canaan.

=== Verse 13 ===
And Joshua blessed him, and gave unto Caleb the son of Jephunneh Hebron for an inheritance.

- "Hebron: this city plays an important role in the history of Israel until, beginning with the burial of Sarah, the wife of Abraham there (Genesis 23:1–7) and continuing after the conquest with David reigning as king first from this city (2 Samuel 5:3–5), but in particular in this verse Hebron becomes the first place in the land of Canaan ("Cisjordan") to be allotted, and this is Joshua's first act of allotment (thus completely assuming the mantle of Moses). The actual conquest of the city by Caleb is recorded in the next chapter (Joshua 15:13–14).

== See also ==
- Anak
- Anakim
- Arba
- Canaan
- Gilgal
- Jordan River
- Kadesh-barnea
- Kenezite
- Kirjatharba
- Kohen
- Moses
- Nun (biblical figure)
- Levite
- Tribe of Ephraim
- Tribe of Gad
- Tribe of Joseph
- Tribe of Judah
- Tribe of Manasseh
- Tribe of Reuben
- Related Bible parts: Numbers 32; Numbers 34; Deuteronomy 2, Deuteronomy 3; Joshua 13, Joshua 15

== Sources ==
- Beal, Lissa M. Wray (2019). Longman, Tremper III; McKnight, Scot (eds.). Joshua. The Story of God Bible Commentary. Zondervan Academic. ISBN 978-0310490838.
- Coogan, Michael David (2007). Coogan, Michael David; Brettler, Marc Zvi; Newsom, Carol Ann; Perkins, Pheme (eds.). The New Oxford Annotated Bible with the Apocryphal/Deuterocanonical Books: New Revised Standard Version, Issue 48 (Augmented 3rd ed.). Oxford University Press. ISBN 978-0195288810.
- Firth, David G. (2021). Joshua: Evangelical Biblical Theology Commentary. Evangelical Biblical Theology Commentary (EBTC) (illustrated ed.). Lexham Press. ISBN 9781683594406.
- Halley, Henry H. (1965). Halley's Bible Handbook: an abbreviated Bible commentary (24th (revised) ed.). Zondervan Publishing House. ISBN 0-310-25720-4.
- Harstad, Adolph L. (2004). Joshua. Concordia Publishing House. ISBN 978-0570063193.
- Hayes, Christine (2015). Introduction to the Bible. Yale University Press. ISBN 978-0300188271.
- Hubbard, Robert L (2009). Joshua. The NIV Application Commentary. Zondervan. ISBN 978-0310209348.
- McConville, Gordon (2007). "9. Joshua". In Barton, John; Muddiman, John (eds.). The Oxford Bible Commentary (first (paperback) ed.). Oxford University Press. pp. 158–176. ISBN 978-0199277186.
- Rösel, Hartmut N. (2011). Joshua. Historical commentary on the Old Testament. Vol. 6 (illustrated ed.). Peeters. ISBN 978-9042925922.
- Webb, Barry G. (2012). The Book of Judges. New International Commentary on the Old Testament. Eerdmans Publishing Company. ISBN 9780802826282.
- Würthwein, Ernst (1995). The Text of the Old Testament. Translated by Rhodes, Erroll F. Grand Rapids, MI: Wm. B. Eerdmans. ISBN 0-8028-0788-7.
