= Arba (biblical figure) =

Figure in the biblical Book of Joshua

Arba (Hebrew: ארבע - literally "Four") was a man mentioned in the Book of Joshua. In Joshua 14:15, he is called the "greatest man among the Anakites." Joshua 15:13 says that Arba was the father of Anak.

The Anakites (Hebrew Anakim) are described in the Hebrew Bible as giants.

Little is known of his genealogy except that Joshua 15:13 describes him as the father of Anak, while the following verse refers to Sheshai, Ahiman, and Talmai as "sons of Anak." According to Joshua, Caleb drove these three out of his portion of the land of Canaan.

The Bible also states that the city of Hebron was in ancient times known to be called Kirjath-Arba or "Kiriath Arba" ("city of Arba"; after Arba). A modern-day settlement does exist east of Hebron named Kiryat Arba.
