= Achsah (name) =

Achsah is an Old Testament Biblical name, belonging to Achsah, daughter of Caleb, wife of Othniel.

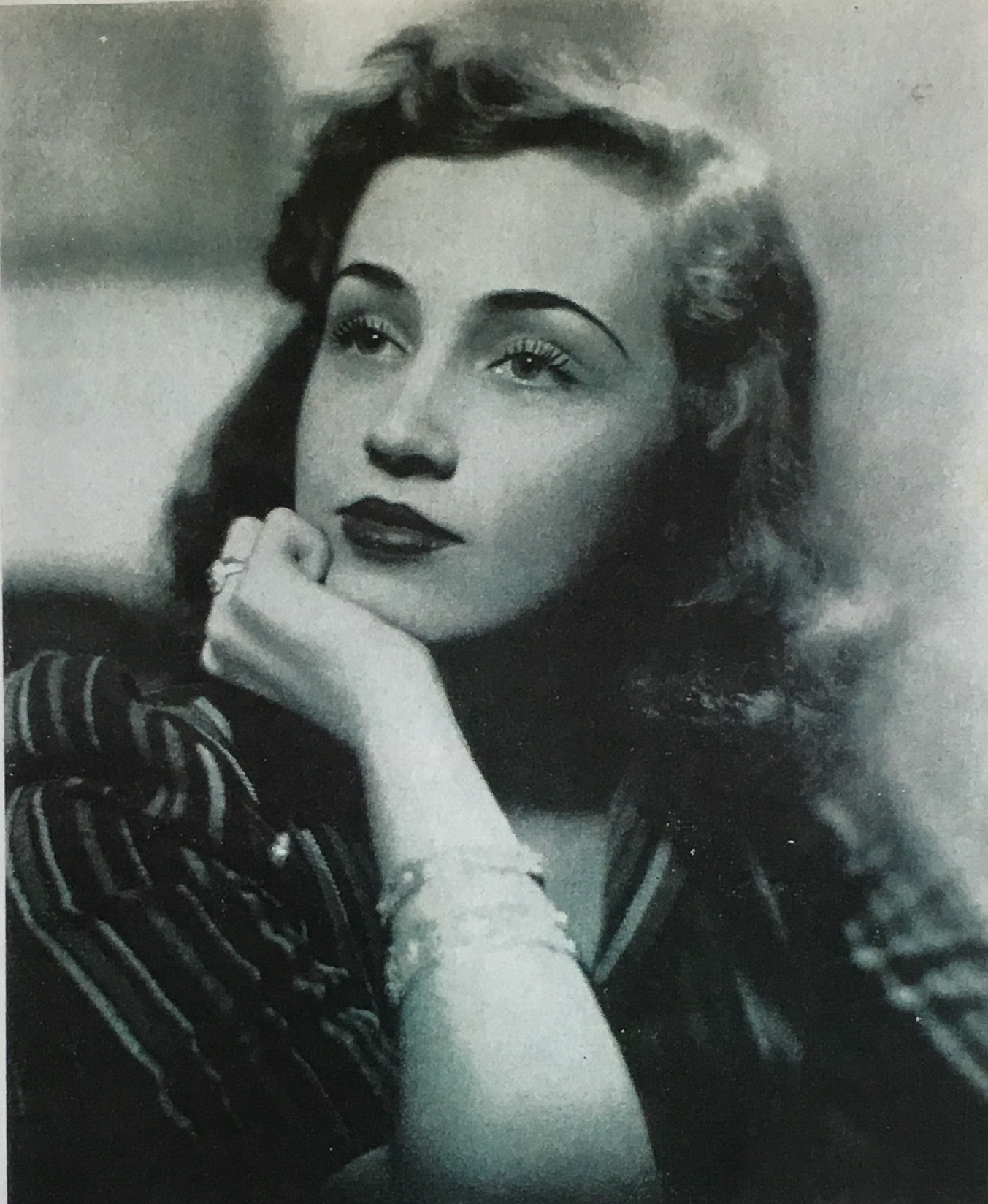
Achsah Bowie Dorsey, 1939

== Notable people ==
- Achsah Barlow Brewster (1879–1945), American artist
- Achsah Dorsey Serpell (1879–1961) and her niece, Achsah Bowie Dorsey (1921–2001), owners of Richland Farm
- Achsah Guibbory, American academic
- Achsah M. Skinner (1877–1956), American missionary teacher in Chile
- Alse Young (1615–1647), sometimes written as Achsah Young, first recorded person executed for witchcraft in the American colonies

== See also ==
- Biblical names
