= Kirjath Sepher =

Biblical location in southern Canaan

N29 G1 Z4 D21 Z1 U33 M17 V13 V1 G40 G1 Z4 D21 Z1 Y4 T14 N25
ḳꜣjrtꜣ(j) ṯwpꜣꜣjr
in hieroglyphs
Era: New Kingdom
(1550–1069 BC)

Kirjath Sepher (Hebrew: קִרְיַת-סֵפֶר; Koine Greek: Καριασσῶφαρ, romanized: Kariassōphar in the LXX,) was a location in southern Canaan which became part of the land allocated to the tribe of Judah when the Israelites conquered Canaan, according to the Hebrew Bible in Joshua 15:16 and Judges 1:12: "And Caleb announced, “I will give my daughter Achsah in marriage to the man who attacks and captures Kiriath-sepher."

According to the narrative, Othniel the son of Kenaz, the brother of Caleb, took Kirjath Sepher and so was married to Achsah.

The place is also referred to as 'Cariath-Sepher', and was later known as Debir. (Judges 1:13)

Kirjath Sepher is mentioned in Papyrus Anastasi I as Karetai Thoupar.

== Kappa Sigma fraternity ==
According to the traditions of the Kappa Sigma fraternity, the fraternity evolved from an ancient order, known in some accounts as "Kirjath Sepher", said to have been founded between 1395 and 1400 at the University of Bologna.
