= Dair (disambiguation) =

Dair is the seventh letter of the Irish Ogham alphabet.

Dair or DAIR may also refer to:

- Al Dair, a village in Bahrain
- Dair (name), a given name or surname
- Dair language, a Nubian language of Sudan
- D&I Railroad, a freight railroad in the United States
- Distributed Artificial Intelligence Research Institute, or DAIR Institute
- Down Air, a move in Super Smash Bros.
