= Cushan-rishathaim =

King of Aram-Naharaim (Northwest Mesopotamia)

King of Aram-Naharaim

According to biblical sources, Cushan-rishathaim (Hebrew: כּוּשַׁן רִשְׁעָתַיִם Kūšan Riš‘āṯayim, "twice-evil Kushite") was king of Aram-Naharaim, or Northwest Mesopotamia, and the first oppressor of the Israelites after their settlement in Canaan. In the Book of Judges, God delivers the Israelites into his hand for eight years (Judges 3:8) as a punishment for polytheism. However, when the people of Israel "called to Jehovah", He saved them through Othniel, son of Kenaz (Judges 3:9).

Scholars have proposed several explanations for Biblical accounts related to this ruler.

'Cushan' or 'Chushan' may indicate Cushite origins. 'Rishathaim' means 'double-wickedness'("resha" רשע - "evil" or "wickedness" + "im" יים - doubling suffix). The latter was most likely a pejorative appellation used by his Hebrew foes, rather than what this King called himself. Use of it may indicate that the Hebrews had concrete reasons to bear him a grudge, beyond the meager information given in the surviving Biblical text.

== Sources ==
- Billington, Clyde E. (2005). "Othniel, Cushan-Rishathaim, and the Date of the Exodus". Beyond the Jordan: Studies in Honor of W. Harold Mare. Eugene: Wipf and Stock Publishers. pp. 117–132. ISBN 9781597520690.
