= Dvir (disambiguation) =

Dvir is a kibbutz in southern Israel.

Dvir may also refer to:

- Dvir (name), including a list of people with the name
- Debir or dvir, a Biblical word
- Dvir (publisher), now part of Kinneret Zmora-Bitan Dvir

== See also ==
- De Vere, a surname
