= Achsah =

Human biblical figure

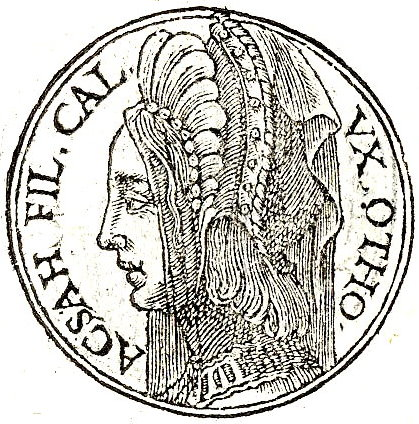
- Achsah from Promptuarii Iconum Insigniorum
- Born: Achsah bat Caleb
- Spouse: Othniel
- Father: Caleb
- Relatives: Kenaz (father-in-law)

Achsah bat Caleb (/ˈæksə/; Hebrew: עַכְסָה, also Acsah), was Caleb ben Yefune's only daughter. Her name comes from the word for "anklet", עכס (ekes).

She was offered in marriage to the man who would lead an attack on the city of Debir, also called Kirjath-sepher/Kirjath-sannah. This was done by Othniel, Caleb's nephew or younger brother, who accordingly was permitted to marry her.

Achsah later requested, and was given, upper and lower springs of water (presumably in the Negev) from her father.

Various Septuagint manuscripts, in various passages, give her name as Ascha, Achsa, Aza, and Oxa.
