= Dair (name) =

Dair is a given name or surname shared by several notable people, including:

== Surname ==
- Carl Dair, Canadian graphic designer
- Hamza Dair (born 2002), Moroccan sprinter
- Lee Dair, Scottish footballer
- Jason Dair (born 1974), Scottish footballer
- John Dair (1933–2005), Scottish actor

== Given name ==
- Dair Asanov (1922–2009), Kyrgyz Soviet major general

== See also ==
- Dvir (name)
