= Ahiman =

Two characters in the Hebrew Bible

Ahiman (/əˈhaɪmən/) is the name of two persons in the Bible:

- One of the three giant sons of Anak (the other two being Sheshai and Talmai) whom Caleb and the Israelite spies saw in Mount Hebron (Book of Numbers 13:22) when they went in to explore the Promised Land. They were afterwards driven out and slain (Joshua 15:14; Judges 1:10).
- A Levite who was one of the guardians of the temple after the Exile (1 Chronicles 9:17).

The name means "brother of the right hand" / "brother of a gift", "liberal."
