= Sheshai =

Sheshai /ˈʃiːˌʃaɪ/ (Biblical Hebrew: שֵׁשַׁי, romanized: Šēšay) was a clan of Anakim living in Hebron named for a son of Anak in the Bible (Numbers 13:22). The clans were driven out of the city by Caleb (Joshua 15:14) and the Tribe of Judah (Judges 1:10).

The two brothers of Sheshai were Ahiman and Talmai.

The Egyptologists and archaeologists Aharon Kempinski and Donald B. Redford have proposed that Sheshi, a Canaanite king ruling over parts of Egypt for some time between 1750 BC and 1650 BC during the Second Intermediate Period, may be the historical figure that gave rise to the Biblical Sheshai.

== Bibliography ==
- Kempinski, Aharon (1983). Syrien und Palästina (Kanaan) in der letzten Phase der Mittelbronze IIB - Zeit (1650 - 1570 v. Chr.). Ägypten und Altes Testament, Bd. 4 (in German). Wiesbaden: Harrassowitz. ISBN 978-3-44-702295-8.
- Redford, Donald (1992). Egypt, Canaan, and Israel in Ancient Times. Princeton: Princeton University Press. ISBN 978-0-69-103606-9.
