= City of Salt =

Town referred to in the Hebrew Bible

The City of Salt or Ir-melah (עיר המלח in Hebrew) is a town referred to in the Hebrew Bible/Old Testament. According to the Book of Joshua 15:62, the town was located in the wilderness of Judah, otherwise known as the Judaean Desert. Scholars such as Martin Noth, Frank Cross and Józef Milik have identified the town with the present-day archaeological site of Khirbet Qumran. Other proposed identifications include En et-Turaba and Maṣad Gozal.

== Ancient name ==
The toponym is occasionally transcribed in English translations of the Hebrew Bible, such as Ir-melah in the JPS Tanakh, which is a transliteration of the Hebrew עיר המלח (ˁîr-hammelaḥ).
