= Caleb, son of Hezron =

Caleb, son of Hezron, was a great-grandson of Judah through Tamar (1 Chronicles 2:3–9). His first wife was Azubah (1 Chronicles 2:18–19). Through his second wife, Ephrata, he was the great-grandfather of the Bezalel, the architect of the Ark of the Covenant.

Caleb's relationship to Caleb, son of Jephunneh (Numbers 13:6–9), also of the tribe of Judah, is unclear.

1 Samuel 25:3 states that Nabal, the husband of Abigail before David, was "of the house of Caleb". It is not stated whether that refers to one of the two Calebs who are mentioned in the Bible or another person bearing the same name.

According to North, in 1 Chronicles, the names Carmi (כרמי] (2:4, "My Vineyard"] and Chelubai (2:9) [כלובי] also refer to Caleb [כלב, "Dog"].
