= Jan P. Fokkelman =

Dutch biblical scholar

- Born: March 23, 1940 (age 86); Batavia, Dutch East Indies
- Occupation: Biblical scholar
- Known for: Literary analysis of the Hebrew Bible

Academic background
- Education: Leiden University

Academic work
- Discipline: Biblical studies
- Sub-discipline: Hebrew Bible
- Institutions: Leiden University

Jan Pieter Fokkelman (born 23 March 1940) is a Dutch biblical scholar renowned for his literary and structural analyses of the Hebrew Bible. His extensive work, particularly on the books of Genesis and Samuel, has significantly influenced modern biblical studies.

== Early life and education ==
Fokkelman was born in Batavia, Dutch East Indies (now Jakarta, Indonesia). During World War II, he and his parents were interned in Japanese camps for three years. In 1946, the family repatriated to the Netherlands, where he pursued his education. He attended the municipal Gymnasium in Hengelo from 1953 to 1958, receiving rigorous training in Latin and Greek, and developing proficiency in English, German, and French.

In 1958, Fokkelman enrolled at Leiden University to study Semitic languages and cultures. He focused on Classical Arabic and Hebrew, and later delved into various Aramaic dialects and Ugaritic. He also studied biblical theology under Professor H. Berkhof, culminating in an 80-page thesis on the anthropomorphic depiction of God in the Old Testament. He graduated cum laude with an M.A. in September 1963.

== Academic career ==
In October 1963, Fokkelman began his academic career as a junior lecturer at Leiden University's Department of Hebrew and Aramaic, assisting Professor T. Jansma. He lectured on subjects including Classical, Mishnaic, and Modern Hebrew; the Hebrew Bible; medieval Spanish-Hebrew poetry; and various forms of Aramaic. Between 1962 and 1968, he also taught Hebrew at the Grotius Gymnasium in Delft.

== Research and publications ==
Fokkelman's early research centered on the narrative cycle of Jacob in Genesis, leading to his doctoral dissertation, later published as Narrative Art in Genesis (1975). This work emphasized a synchronic literary analysis of biblical texts.

He then embarked on an extensive project analyzing the books of Samuel, resulting in the four-volume series Narrative Art and Poetry in the Books of Samuel (NAPS):

- Volume I: King David (1981)
- Volume II: The Crossing Fates (1986)
- Volume III: Throne and City (1990)
- Volume IV: Vow and Desire (1993)

These volumes offer comprehensive stylistic and structural analyses of the Samuel texts.

In 1982–83, Fokkelman was a Fellow at the Institute for Advanced Studies at the Hebrew University of Jerusalem. In 1990–91, he held a Fellowship at the National Humanities Center in North Carolina, where he completed significant portions of NAPS IV.

Post-NAPS, Fokkelman focused on biblical poetry. During a fellowship at the Netherlands Institute for Advanced Study (NIAS) in 1998–99, he discovered that poets of Psalms and Job employed precise syllabic structures, with average syllables per colon being exact integers (7, 8, or 9). This research culminated in the multi-volume Major Poems of the Hebrew Bible, analyzing the structural and prosodic features of these texts.

In 2003, he co-edited De Bijbel Literair, a Dutch literary guide to the Bible, contributing four chapters. For general audiences, he authored introductory books on biblical narrative and poetry, published in Dutch (1995, 2000, 2009) and translated into English, Indonesian, French, Italian, and Chinese. His 2009 Dutch translation of the Book of Job presented the poems in strophic form with commentary, followed by an English bilingual edition in 2012.

== Legacy ==
Jan P. Fokkelman's meticulous literary analyses have profoundly influenced modern biblical scholarship, particularly in understanding the narrative and poetic structures of the Hebrew Bible. Fokkelman is perhaps best known for his 4-volume, 2400-page work on the Books of Samuel. Fokkelman is a central figure in the "narrative revolution" in biblical studies, which emphasises a literary approach to the text. He lives in Zutphen.

== Selected works ==
- Narrative Art in Genesis: Specimens of Stylistic and Structural Analysis (1975)
- Narrative Art and Poetry in the Books of Samuel (4 vols., 1981–1993)
- Major Poems of the Hebrew Bible (multiple volumes, 1998–2004)
- De Bijbel Literair (co-editor, 2003)
