= Aram-Naharaim =

Biblical term for the ancient land of the Arameans

Aram-Naharaim (Hebrew: אֲרַם נַהֲרַיִם ʾĂram Nahărayim, literally "Aram of the two rivers") is the biblical term for an ancient land along the great bend of the Euphrates River.

It is mentioned five times in the Hebrew Bible, in Genesis 24:10, Deuteronomy 23:4, Judges 3:8-10, 1 Chronicles 19:6, and Psalm 60:1. In the Book of Genesis, it is used somewhat interchangeably with the names Paddan Aram and Haran to denote the place where Abraham stayed briefly with his father Terah's family after leaving Ur of the Chaldees, while en route to Canaan (Genesis 11:31), and the place from which later patriarchs obtained wives, rather than marrying local women from Canaan.

== See also ==
- Aram (region)
- Chushan-Rishathaim
- Paddan Aram

== Sources ==
- Butts, Aaron M. (2019). "The Classical Syriac Language". The Syriac World. London: Routledge. pp. 222–242.
- Lipiński, Edward (2000). The Aramaeans: Their Ancient History, Culture, Religion. Leuven: Peeters Publishers. ISBN 9789042908598.
- Younger, Kenneth Lawson (2016). A Political History of the Arameans: From Their Origins to the End of Their Polities. Atlanta: SBL Press. ISBN 9781628370843.
- Wevers, John W. (2001). "Aram and Aramaean in the Septuagint". The World of the Aramaeans. Vol. 1. Sheffield: Sheffield Academic Press. pp. 237–251. ISBN 9781841271583.
- Wright, William (1871). Fragments of the Turrāṣ mamllā nahrāyā or Syriac Grammar of Jacob of Edessa. London: Gilbert and Rivington.
