= Achsah M. Skinner =

American missionary (1877–1956)

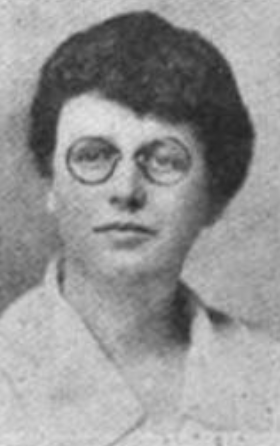
- Skinner, in a 1920 publication
- Born: Achsah Mary Skinner; July 15, 1877; Oneonta, Otsego County, New York, U.S.
- Died: December 25, 1956 (aged 79); Daytona Beach, Florida, U.S.
- Education: Oneonta Normal School, 1900; Teachers College, Columbia University
- Occupation: Missionary educator in Chile
- Awards: Order of Merit

Achsah Mary Skinner (July 15, 1877 – December 25, 1956) was an American educator and Methodist missionary, who taught in Iquique, Chile, for 27 years. She received Chile's Order of Merit for her work.

== Early life and education ==
Skinner was born on July 15, 1877 (Note: Also cited as July 15, 1881.)) in Oneonta, Otsego County to Henry P. Skinner and Elvira E. Skinner (née Parish). Skinner had two older brothers. In 1879, when Skinner was two years old, her father died of scarlet fever aged 32.

In 1900, Skinner graduated from Oneonta Normal School before later studying at Teachers College, Columbia University.

== Career ==
Skinner taught school in Schenevus and Poughkeepsie for thirteen years. She taught English at a school in the Chilean port city Iquique for 27 years, organized a women's club, and ran a Sunday school and a small children's dispensary there.

She spoke to American audiences about her work and about South America more generally, during her only furlough in 1926, and after she retired. Skinner was decorated by the Chilean government with the Order of Merit, for her educational work. In her later years she taught at Boylan Haven School in Jacksonville, Florida.

== Personal life ==
Skinner died in 1956, at a hospital in Daytona Beach, Florida, at the age of 79.
