= Mered =

Biblical character (First Book of Chronicles)

Mered is a biblical character, who was from the Tribe of Judah and noted as the husband of Bithiah, daughter of Pharaoh. See Books of Chronicles (I Chronicles 4:17–18). According to the Midrash, Bithiah was one of the mothers of Moses.

== In traditions ==
Jewish traditions identify Mered with Caleb, and his wife Bithiah with the princess who rescued Moses from the river.

== In film ==
In the 1956 film The Ten Commandments, Mered is shown as an admirable man, strong, wise, kind, and compassionate. He joins Moses in welcoming Bithiah into Moses' home during the night of the final plague on Egypt. He also saves her life when he stops her from running to interpose herself between the people of Israel and the charging Egyptian chariots - which would certainly have resulted in her death. When the Egyptian army drowns in the returning sea, Mered comforts Bithiah in her grief. Mered is also seen with Bithiah, Miriam, and Sephora in Moses' tent during the rebellion led by Dathan while Moses and Joshua were on Mount Sinai.
