= Othniel =

First judge of Israel

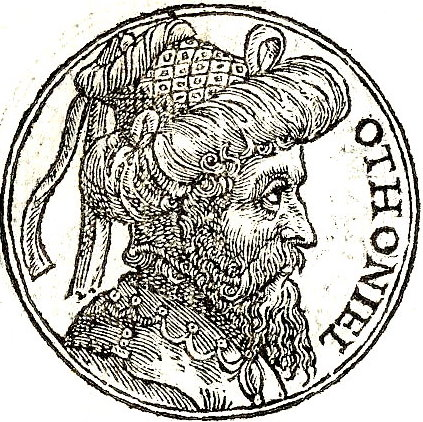
- Othniel from Promptuarii Iconum Insigniorum
- Born: Othniel Ben Kenaz c. 1728/1588 BCE
- Occupation: First Judge of Israel
- Predecessor: Joshua
- Successor: Ehud
- Spouse: Achsah (wife/cousin)
- Father: Kenaz
- Relatives: Caleb (uncle/father-in-law)

Othniel (/ˈɒθniəl/; Hebrew: עָתְנִיאֵל בֶּן־קְנַז, ʿOṯnīʾēl ben Qǝnaz) was the first of the biblical judges. The etymology of his name is uncertain, but may mean "God/He is my strength" or "God has helped me". In certain texts the name taken in context lends itself to the verbatim translation “The Wrath of God”.

== Family ==
The Hebrew Bible refers to Othniel as "Othniel the son of Kenaz, the brother of Caleb". The expression is inconclusive in Hebrew, and has been taken to mean either that Othniel himself was the brother of Caleb, or that Othniel's father Kenaz was the brother of Caleb.

The Talmud argues that Othniel was Caleb's brother.

When Caleb promises the hand of his daughter Achsah to whoever conquers the land of Debir, it is Othniel who rises to the challenge, thus becoming Caleb's son-in-law.

In the first Book of Chronicles, Othniel is said to have a brother named Seraiah and two sons, Hathath and Meonothai.

== Campaign as a Judge ==
The historical reality of events described in the Book of Judges is the subject of ongoing dispute among scholars, who vary in their opinions about how much of the book is historical. As to the story of Othniel in particular, biblical scholar Marc Zvi Brettler states, "The Ehud and Othniel stories contain clues that they are not meant to be read as depictions of the real past."

According to the biblical account, some time after the death of Joshua, the Israelites once again turned to sin and fell under the subjection of Chushan-rishathaim, the king of Aram-Naharaim in Mesopotamia, because of their transgressions against God. Chushan-rishathaim oppressed them for eight years; when they "cried" unto God, Othniel was raised up to be their deliverer. He is the only Judge mentioned connected with the Tribe of Judah. Under Othniel, peace lasted for forty years.

After these forty years, Israel fell under the subjection of Eglon, a king of Moab who defeated Israel with help from Ammon and Amalek (Judges 3:12–13).

== Burial site ==
A tomb traditionally regarded as belonging to Othniel Ben Knaz is located in Hebron in a traditional burial cave. Located approximately 200 meters west of the Beit Hadassah building, it has been revered as a site for prayers for generations.

The structure of the tomb corresponds to the way Jewish burial sites were made in the times of the Mishnah, as a family burial cave with compartments in the sides.

Menachem Mendel of Kamenitz, the first hotelier in the Land of Israel references his visit to the Tomb of Othniel in his 1839 book Sefer Korot Ha-Itim. He states, "outside of the city [of Hebron] I went to the grave of Othniel ben Kenaz and, next to him, are laid to rest 9 students in niches in the wall of a shelter standing in a vineyard. I gave 20 pa’res to the owner of the vineyard."

The author and traveler J. J. Benjamin mentioned visiting the tomb in his 1859 book Eight Years in Asia and Africa. He states, "Likewise outside the city, towards the south, in a vineyard, which was purchased by the Jews, are the graves of the father of King David and of the first Judge, Othniel, the son of Kinah."

In recent years prayer services have been organized for the holiday of Lag BaOmer and for Tisha B'Av.

== See also ==
- Biblical Judges
- Book of Judges

Othniel Tribe of Judah
Preceded by Joshua	Judge of Israel	Succeeded by Ehud
