= Pharaoh's daughter (Exodus) =

Adoptive mother of the prophet Moses

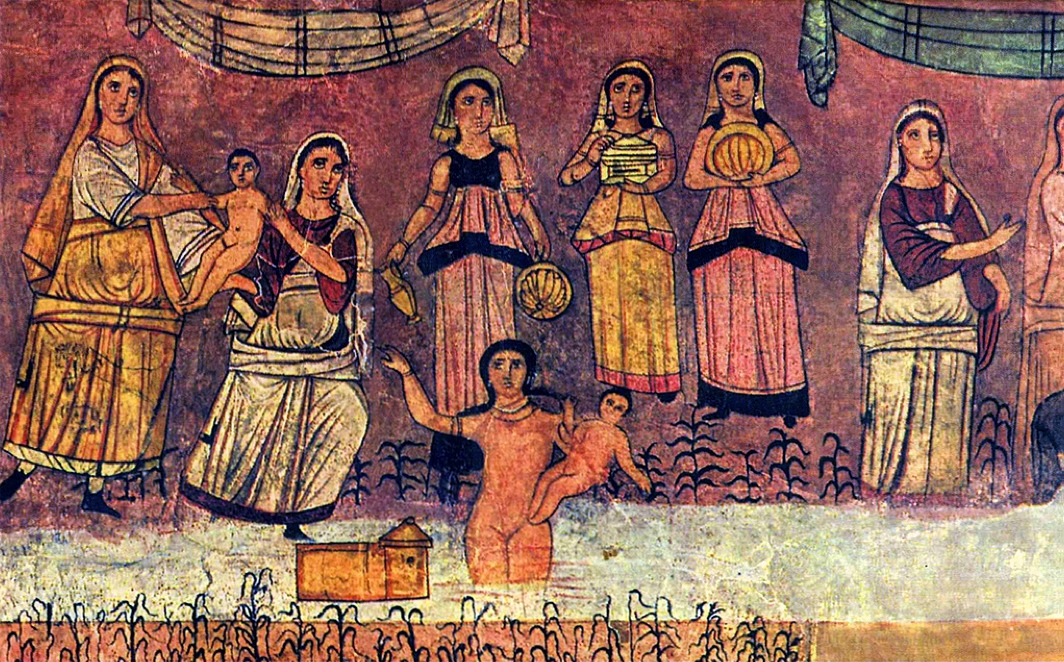
- Finding of Moses in the Dura-Europos synagogue, c. AD 244
- First appearance: Book of Exodus

In-universe information
- Aliases: Thermouthis (birth name, Judaism); Bithiah (adopted name, Judaism); Merris (Christianity); Maris (Christianity); Merrhoe (Christianity)
- Spouse: Mered
- Children: Moses (adoptive)
- Religion: Ancient Egyptian religion (formerly); Judaism (convert)
- Nationality: Egyptian

The Pharaoh's daughter (Hebrew: בַּת־פַּרְעֹה, lit. 'daughter of Pharaoh') in the story of the finding of Moses in the biblical Book of Exodus is an important, albeit minor, figure in Abrahamic religions. Though some variations of her story exist, the general consensus among Jews, Christians and Muslims is that she is the adoptive mother of the prophet Moses. Muslims identify her with Asiya, the Great Royal Wife of the pharaoh. In either version, she saved Moses from certain death from both the Nile River and from the Pharaoh. As she ensured the well-being of Moses throughout his early life, she played an essential role in lifting the Hebrew slaves out of bondage in Egypt, their journey to the Promised Land, and the establishment of the Ten Commandments.

== Her name ==
Exodus 2:5 does not give a name to Pharaoh's daughter or to her father; she is referred to in Hebrew as Baṯ-Parʿo (Hebrew: בת־פרעה), "daughter of Pharaoh." The Book of Jubilees 47:5 and Josephus both call her Thermouthis (Greek: Θερμουθις), also transliterated as Tharmuth and Thermutis, the Greek name of Renenutet, a fertility deity depicted as an Egyptian cobra. She is referred to as Merris (or Maris) by Artapanus of Alexandria and Maris by Michael the Syrian. Some within Jewish tradition have tried to identify her with a "daughter of Pharaoh" in 1 Chronicles 4:17–18 named Bitya. An example of this is found in Leviticus Rabbah 1:3, which refers to her as Bat-Yah (Hebrew: בתיה, lit. 'daughter of Yahweh'). It states she was given the name for her adoption of Moses, that because she had made Moses her son, Yahweh would make her his daughter. In 1 Chronicles 4:18, she is called ha-yəhudiyya (Hebrew: הַיְהֻדִיָּ֗ה, lit. 'the Jewess'), which some English translations of the Bible treat as a given name, Jehudijah (Hebrew: יהודיה, romanized: yehudiyyah, lit. 'Jewess'), notably the King James Version, but the word is an appelative, there to indicate that Pharaoh's daughter was no longer a pagan. However, some have criticized the idea that the "daughter of Pharaoh" in 1 Chronicles named Bithiah is the same as the one who adopted Moses since there is no textual indication that this is the case and the chronology may not be consistent with that conclusion. Hatshepsut has also been suggested.

== In Judaism ==
Now the daughter of Pharaoh came down to bathe at the river, and her maidens walked beside the river; she saw the basket among the reeds and sent her maid to fetch it. When she opened it she saw the child; and lo, the babe was crying. She took pity on him and said, "This is one of the Hebrews' children." Then his sister said to Pharaoh's daughter, "Shall I go and call you a nurse from the Hebrew women to nurse the child for you?" And Pharaoh's daughter said to her, "Go." So the girl went and called the child's mother. And Pharaoh's daughter said to her, "Take this child away, and nurse him for me, and I will give you your wages." So the woman took the child and nursed him. And the child grew, and she brought him to Pharaoh's daughter, and he became her son; and she named him Moses, for she said, "Because I drew him out of the water."

— RSV, Exodus 2:5–10

In the Jewish narrative, Pharaoh's daughter first appears in the Book of Exodus, in Exodus 2:5–10. The passage describes her discovery of the Hebrew child, Moses, in the rushes of the Nile River and her willful defiance of her father's orders that all male Hebrew children be drowned in the "Yeor" (Hebrew: יְאוֹר) (Nile), instead taking the child, whom she knows to be a Hebrew, and raising him as her own son. The Talmud and the Midrash Vayosha provide some additional backstory to the event, saying that she had visited the Nile that morning not to bathe for the purpose of hygiene but for ritual purification, treating the river as if it were a mikveh, as she had grown tired of people's idolatrous ways, and that she first sought to nurse Moses herself but he would not take her milk and so, she called for a Hebrew wet nurse, who so happened to be Moses' biological mother, Jochebed.

Rabbinic literature tells a significantly different take on the events that day, portraying Pharaoh's daughter as having suffered from a skin disease (possibly leprosy), the pain of which only the cold waters of the Nile could relieve, and that these lesions healed when she found Moses. It also describes an encounter with the archangel Gabriel, who kills two of her handmaidens for trying to dissuade her from rescuing Moses. After Moses is weaned, Pharaoh's daughter gives him his name, Moshé (Hebrew: מֹשֶה) purportedly taken from the word māšāh (Hebrew: מָשָׁה, lit. 'to draw from water'), because she drew him from the water, but some modern scholars disagree with the Biblical etymology of the name, believing it to have been based on the Egyptian root m-s, meaning "son" or "born of," a popular element in Egyptian names (e. g. Ramesses, Thutmose) used in conjunction with a namesake deity.

According to Jewish tradition, in her later years, Pharaoh's daughter devotes herself to Moses and to Yahweh and leaves Egypt with him for the Promised Land. Citing a passage in the Books of Chronicles (1 Chronicles 4:17-18), some have maintained that she is the one who is said to have married a member of the Tribe of Judah, Mered, and to have had children with him. Additionally, she is referred to there as a Jewess, indicating that she had accepted Yahweh as her own god. Furthermore, the Jewish rabbis claim that, in the Book of Proverbs (Proverbs 31:15), she is praised in Woman of Valor. Further, the Midrash teaches that because of her devotion to Yahweh and her adoption of Moses, she was one of those who entered heaven alive.

== In Islam ==
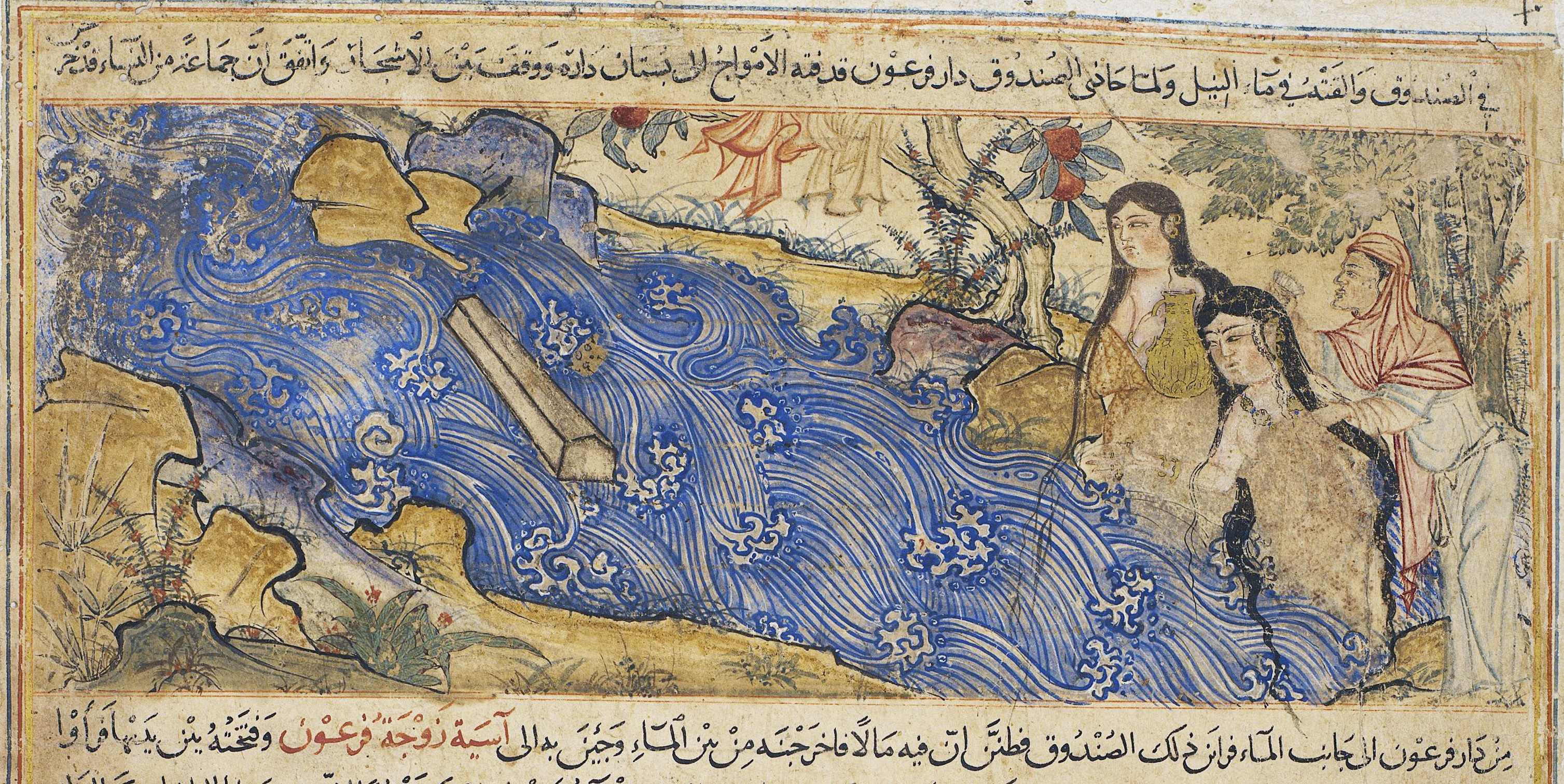
Asiya and her servants find baby Moses in the Nile. (From the Persian Jami' al-tawarikh).

The Pharaoh's daughter's name is not mentioned in the Quran. However, it was given in other sources such as the Hadith.

In the Hadith traced by Ibn ‘Abbas, he said: The Messenger of Allah (Prophet of Islam, Muhammad), peace and blessings be upon him, said: “On the night I was taken on the Isra (Night Journey), a pleasant scent came to me. I said: ‘O Gabriel, what is this pleasant scent?’ He replied: ‘This is the scent of the hairdresser, the daughter of Pharaoh, and her children.’ He continued, ‘What is her story?’ He said: ‘While she was combing Pharaoh’s daughter’s hair one day, the comb fell from her hand, and she said: “In the name of Allah.” Pharaoh's daughter said: “My father?” She replied: “No, but my Lord and your father’s Lord is Allah.” She said: “Shall I inform him of this?” She replied: “Yes.” So, she informed him, and he called her and said: “O so-and-so, do you have a lord other than me?” She said: “Yes, my Lord and your Lord is Allah.” He then ordered a cow made of brass to be heated up, and then commanded that she and her children be thrown into it. She said to him, ‘I have one request to you,’ he said, ‘What is your need?’ She said: ‘I would like you to gather my bones and the bones of my children in one cloth and bury us.’ He replied, ‘That is your right upon us.’ He ordered her children to be thrown in front of her one by one until it was the turn of a suckling child she had. It seemed she hesitated because of him, he said: ‘O mother, plunge in, for the punishment of this world is lesser than the punishment of the Hereafter.’ So, she plunged in.”

This narration is found in Imam Ahmad’s “Musnad” (1/309), Al-Tabarani (12280).

In the Quran, Pharaoh's wife does not draw Moses from the river Nile, her servants do, and Pharaoh, having learned of the boy's existence, seeks to kill him but she intervenes and Pharaoh changes his mind, allowing the boy to live. Mirroring the Judeo-Christian story, Jochebed is called to Pharaoh's palace to act as a wet nurse for him. Another wife of another pharaoh of exodus named Asiya professes Moses' belief in God (Allah).

== Art and culture ==
Pharaoh's daughter is often included in Exodus-related art and fiction. Several artworks portray the finding of Moses.

In medieval Irish legend, Pharaoh's daughter is named Scota and is the ancestor of the Gaels.

In George Gershwin's 1935 opera Porgy and Bess, the song It Ain't Necessarily So mentions Pharaoh's daughter finding baby Moses.

The Moses Chronicles (2015-), a novel-trilogy by H. B. Moore, includes Pharaoh's daughter. Parts of the story are written from her perspective.

In her poem 'Epitaph', the American poet Eleanor Wilner depicts Pharaoh's daughter as having raised Moses, whom she honed 'like a sword', to be a rebel within the palace household. See Chapters into Verse, edited by Robert Atwan and Laurance Wieder (2000), New York: Oxford University Press, pp. 66–67.

Drama-films depicting her include The Ten Commandments (1956), the animated musical The Prince of Egypt (1998) and Exodus: Gods and Kings (2014). TV-dramas include Moses (1995).

== Gallery ==
Pharaoh's daughter
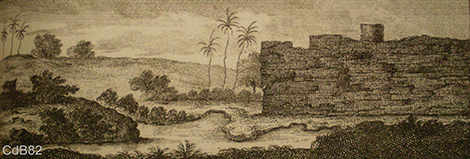
Place where the pharaoh's daughter saved Moses from the Nile river, 1698 sketch made by Dutch traveller Cornelis de Bruijn on his journey through Egypt. The local inhabitants pointed out this spot.

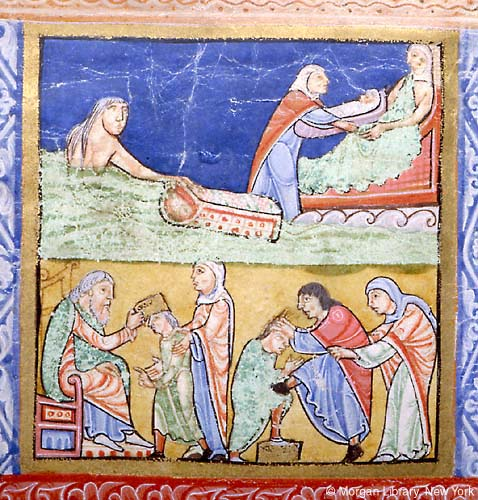
12th century

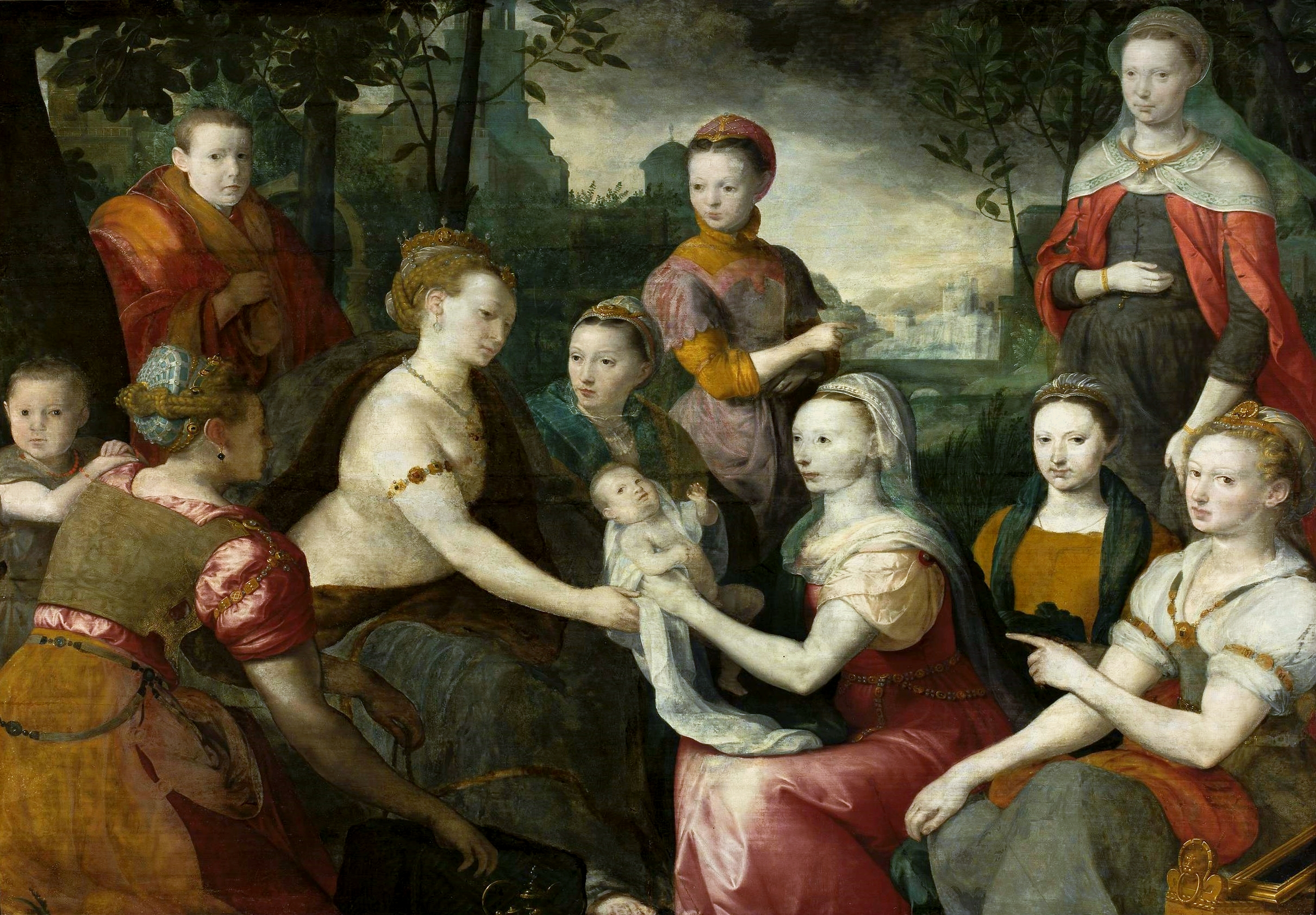
Moses Saved from the Waters (c. 1556), Bernaert de Rijckere

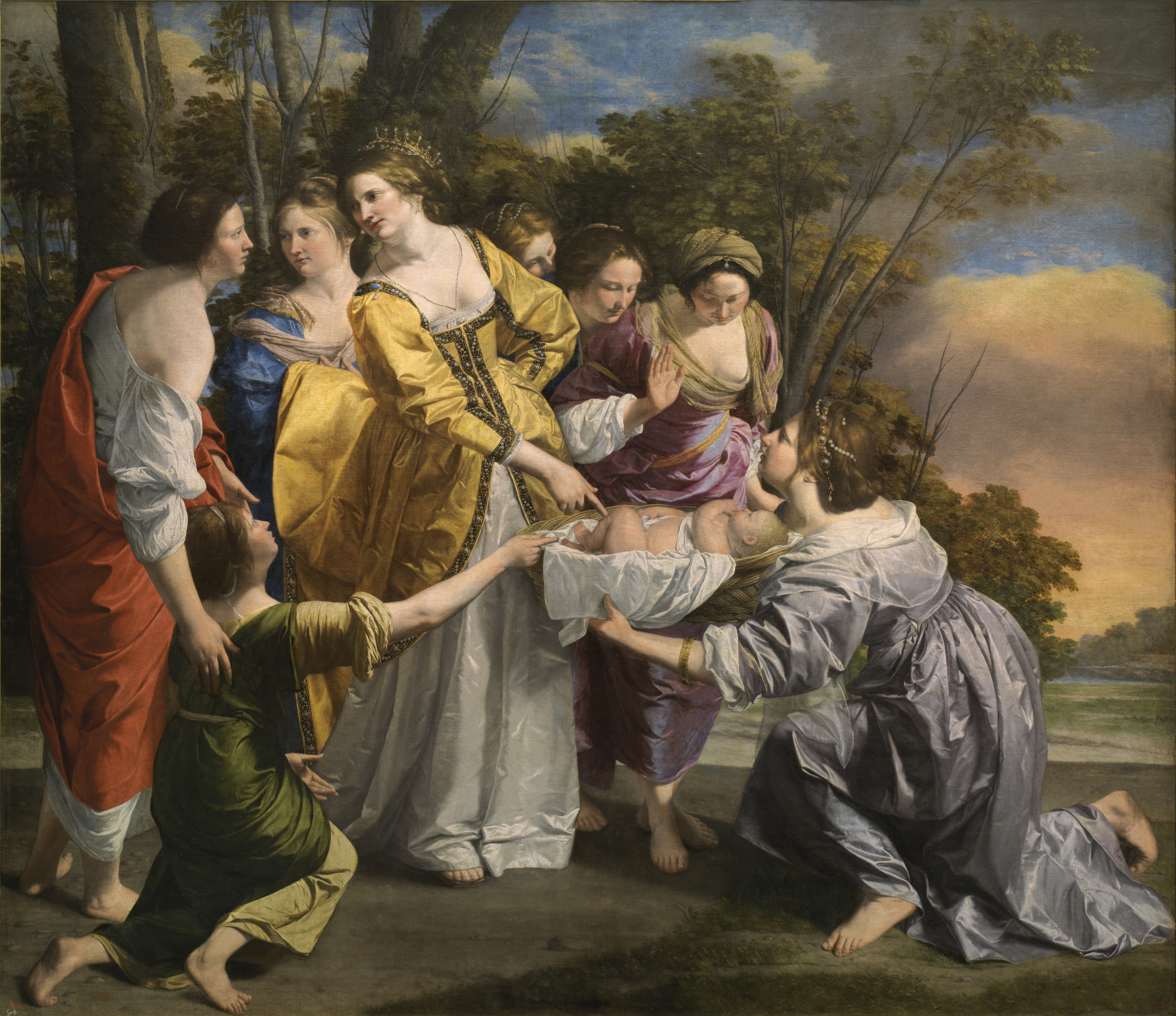
Moses Saved from the Waters (1633), Orazio Gentileschi

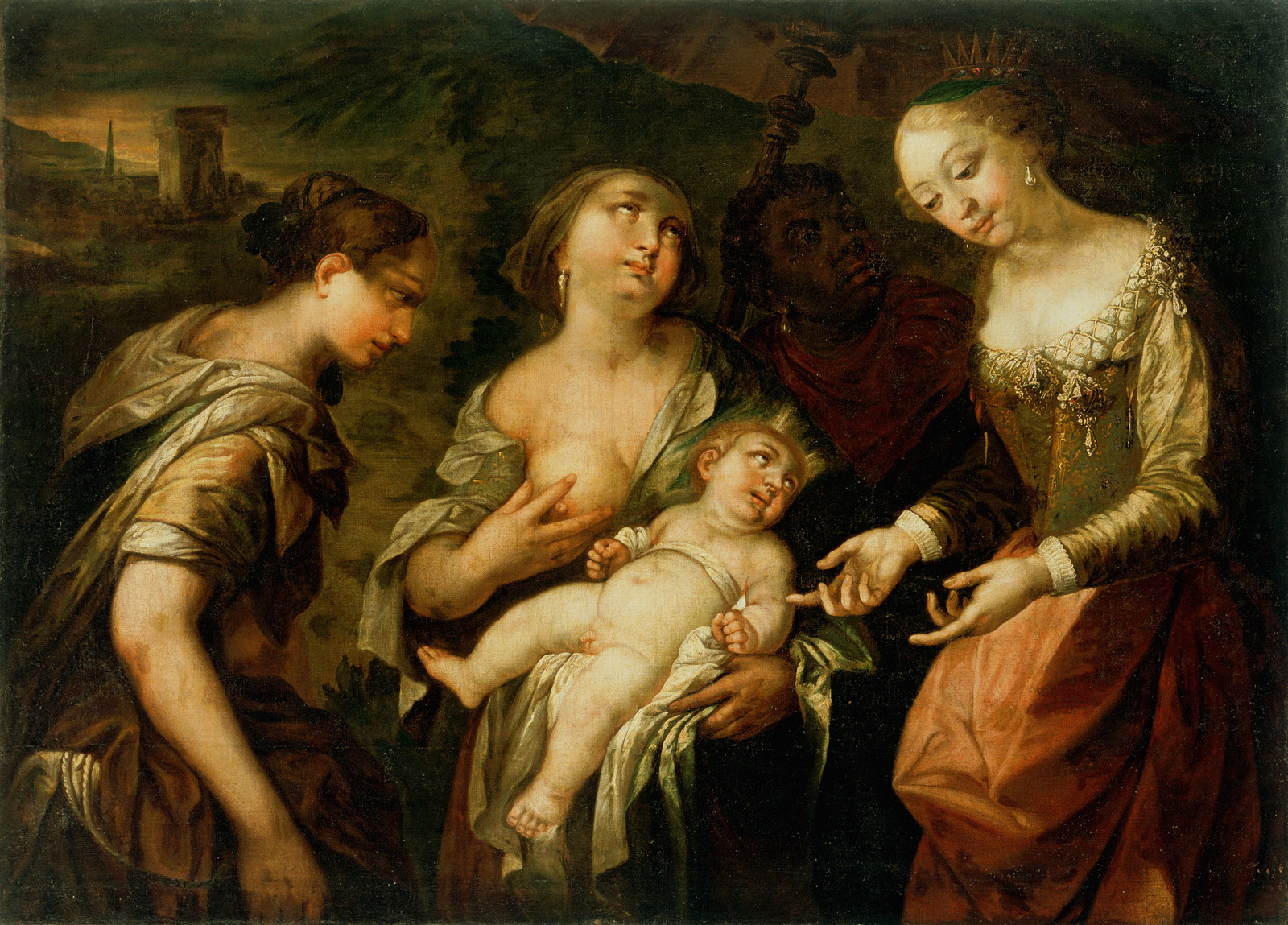
The Finding of Moses (17th century), Andrea Celesti

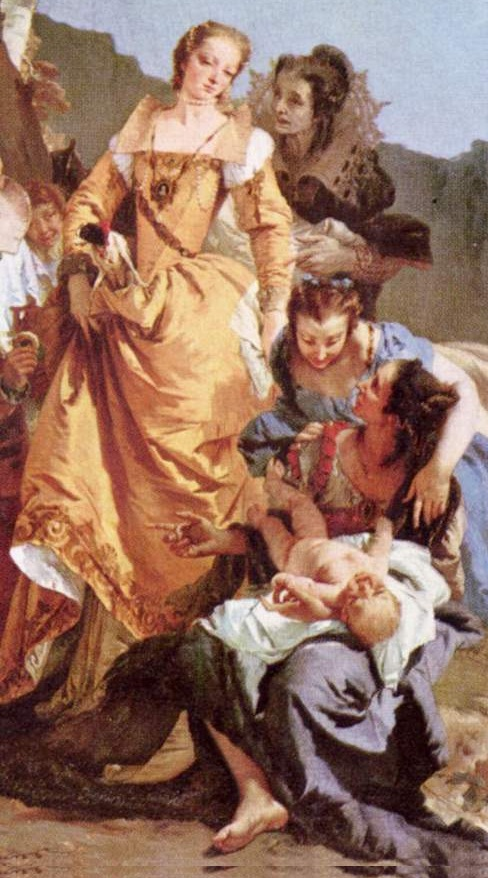
The Finding of Moses (1740), Giovanni Battista Tiepolo

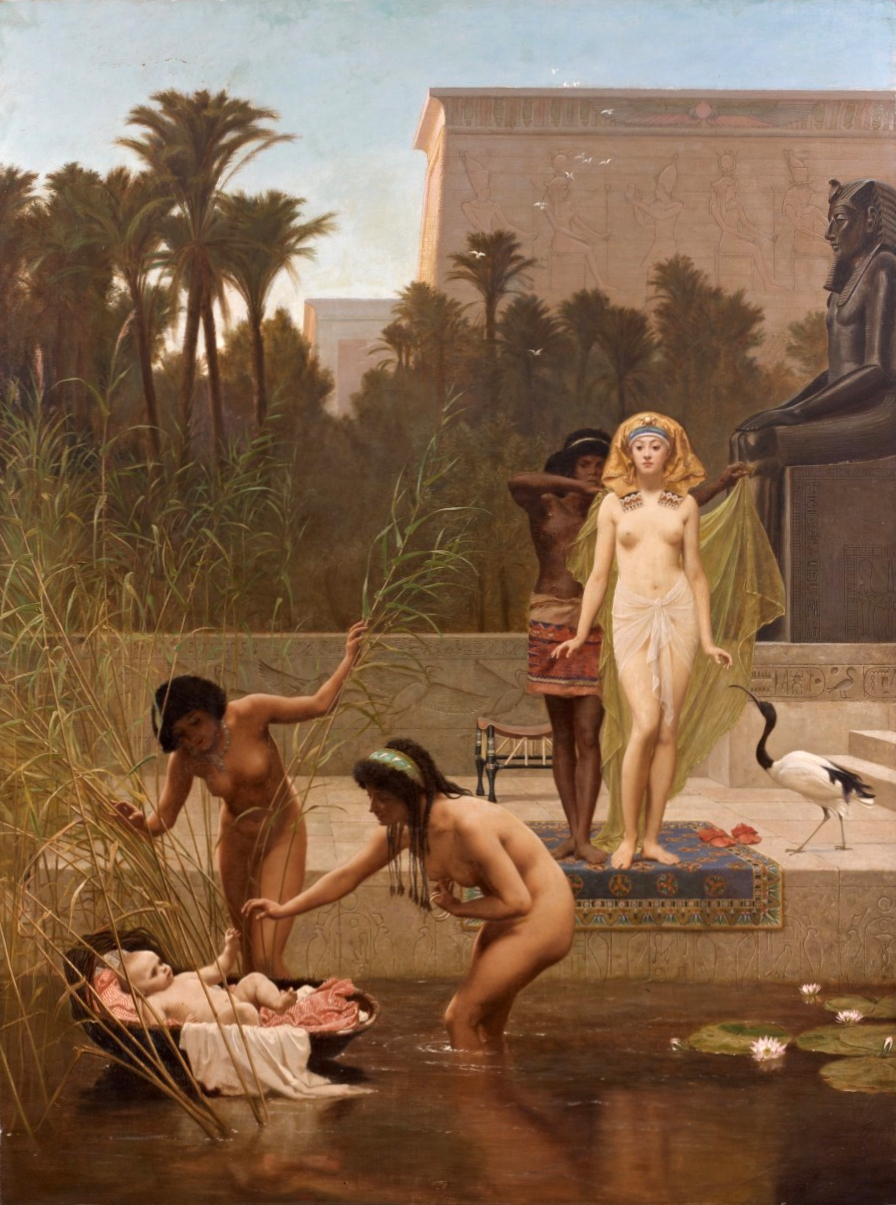
The Finding of Moses (1862), Frederick Goodall

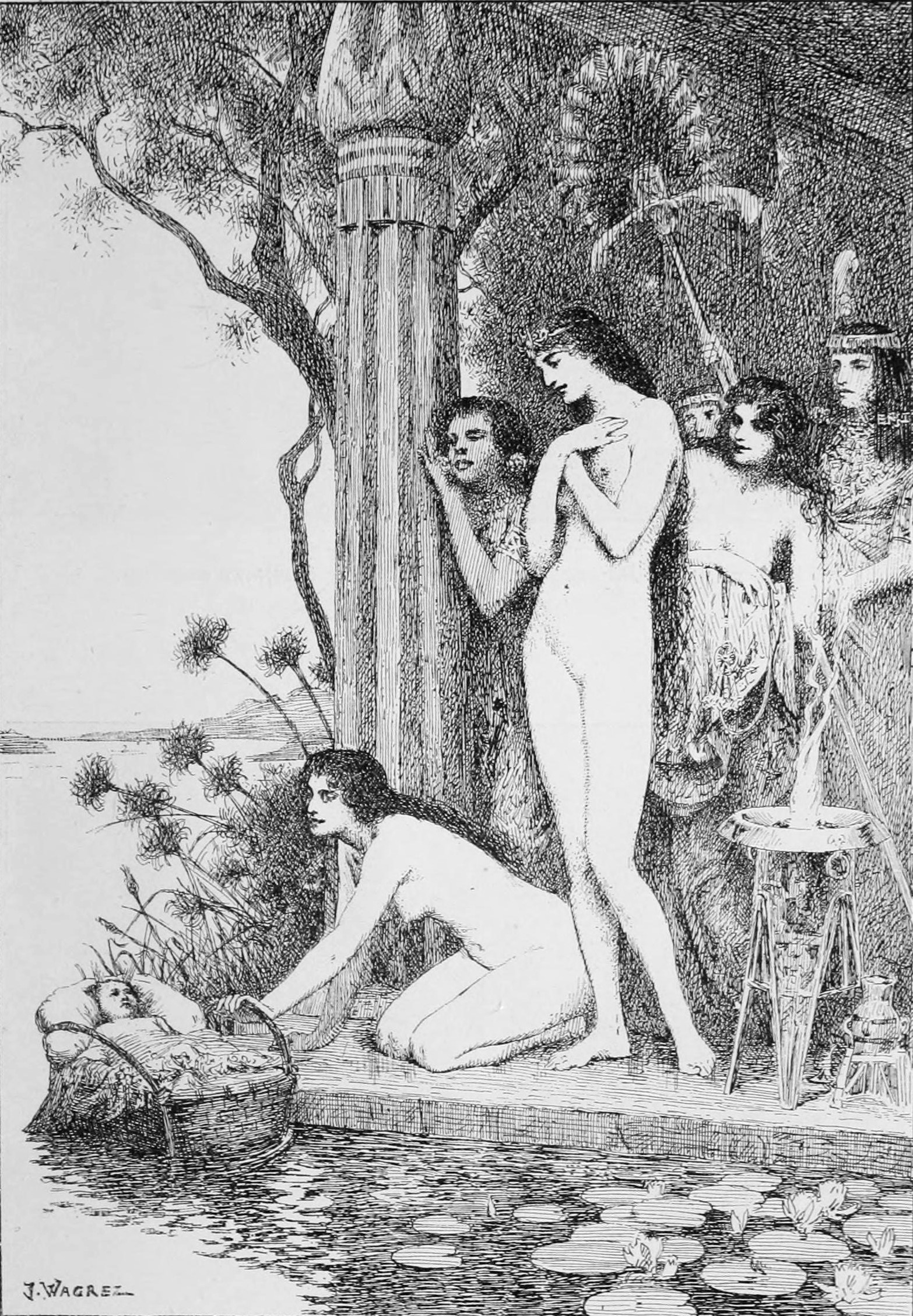
Moses Saved from the Waters (1894), Jacques Clement Wagrez

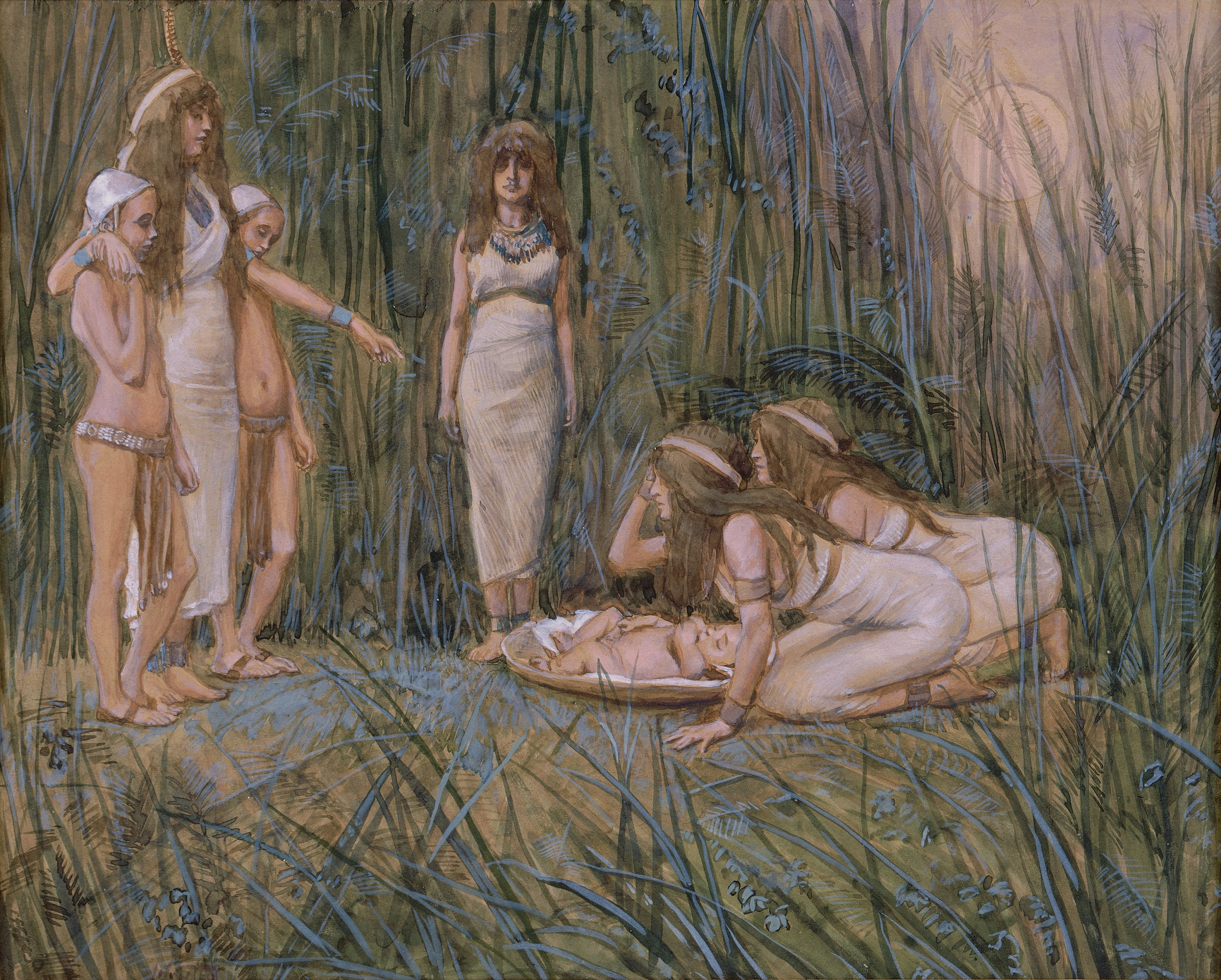
Pharaoh's Daughter Receives the Mother of Moses (c. 1900), James Tissot

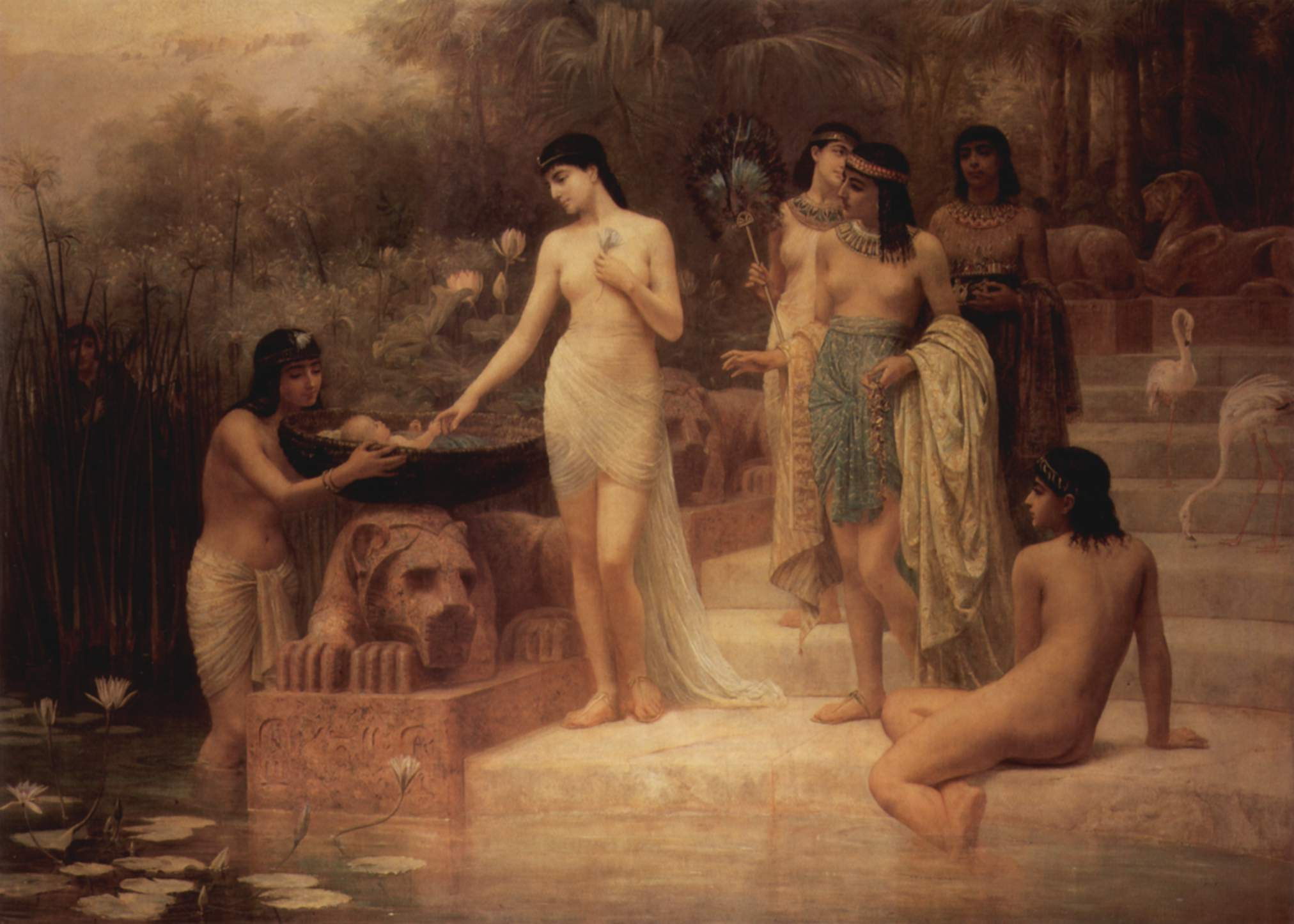
The Discovery of Moses (1886), Edwin Long

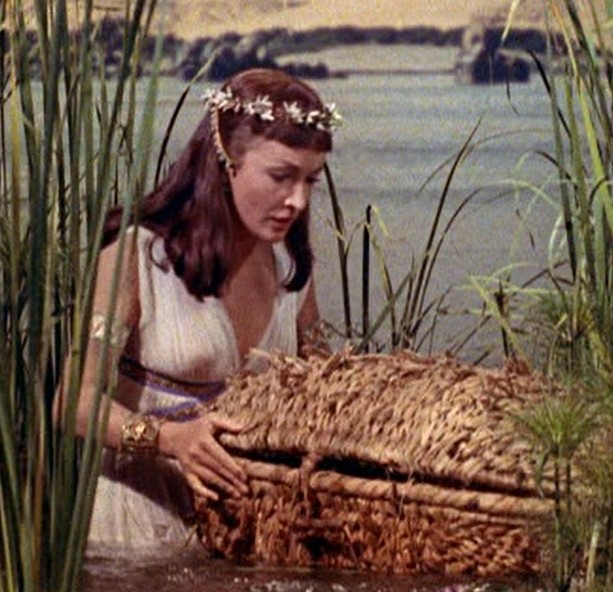
Bithiah finds the infant Moses in The Ten Commandments, 1956

== See also ==
- Moses in rabbinic literature
- List of names for the Biblical nameless

== Bibliography ==
- Encyclopaedia Judaica, 1972, Keter Publishing House, Jerusalem, Israel.
- Jewish Encyclopedia.com
- Bithiah. (n.d.). Hitchcock's Bible Names Dictionary. Retrieved January 28, 2008, from Dictionary.com website:
