= Anak =

Figure in the Hebrew Bible

Anak (/ˈeɪnæk/; Hebrew: עֲנָק, pronounced [ʕaˈnɔːq], homophone to a word for "giant, long neck, necklace") is a figure in the Hebrew Bible. His descendants are mentioned in narratives concerning the conquest of Canaan by the Israelites. According to the Book of Numbers, Anak was a forefather of the Anakim, a Rephaite tribe according to Deuteronomy 2:11 . In their report, ten of the twelve Israelite spies associated the Anakim with the Nephilim of Genesis 6:1–4.

== Etymology ==
L. Nesiolowski-Spano proposed a hypothesis that his name is derived from the Greek 'wanax', 'ruler'.

== In the Bible ==
The first biblical reference to the sons of Anak occurs in Numbers 13. The Israelite leader, Moses, sends twelve spies (representing the Twelve Tribes of Israel) to scout out the land of Canaan. The spies enter from the Negev desert and journey northward through the Judaean hills until they arrive at the brook of Eshcol near Hebron, where reside the sons of Anak: Sheshai, Ahiman, and Talmai. After the scouts have explored the entire land, they bring back samples of the fruit of the land. The scouts then report to Moses and the congregation that "the land indeed is a land flowing with milk and honey". However, in Numbers 13:33, ten of the twelve spies state that the inhabitants of the land are descended from the Nephilim, discouraging the Israelites from even attempting to possess the land. They report that the inhabitants and cities are stronger than the Israelites, and that they feel like grasshoppers in their presence. However, the "faithful" spies Caleb and Joshua do not verify this report, leading some scholars to believe that the "fearful" reports from the other ten are hyperbolic and should not be taken literally.

The Anakites are later mentioned briefly in the books of Deuteronomy, Joshua, and Judges. Caleb, one of the twelve spies sent by Moses into Canaan, later drove out the descendants of Anak — his three sons — from Hebron, also called Kiriath Arba (Judges 1:20).

== Extrabiblical mentions ==
A woman of a similar name, ʿAnāq bint Ādam, appears as the mother of ʿŪj (the Arabic equivalent of Og) in Islamic tradition.

The Egyptian Execration texts of the Middle Kingdom (2055-1650 BC) mention a list of political enemies in Canaan, and among this list are a group called the "ly Anaq" or people of Anaq. The three rulers of ly Anaq were Erum, Abiyamimu, and Akirum.

Robert Graves, considering the relationship between the Anakites and Philistia (Joshua 11:21, Jeremiah 47:5), identifies the Anakim with Anax, the giant ruler of the Anactorians in Greek mythology.

== Cultural references ==
In Herman Melville's 1851 novel Moby-Dick (Chapter 59. Squid.) narrator Ishmael alludes to "the great Kraken of Bishop Pontoppodan," then concludes the chapter: "By some naturalists who have vaguely heard rumors of the mysterious creature, here spoken of, it is included among the class of cuttle-fish, to which, indeed, in certain external respects it would seem to belong, but only as the Anak of the tribe."

In Sir Walter Scott's novel Rob Roy (Chapter VI) the cousin, Raleigh, is described thus, “He was of low stature, whereas all his brethren seemed to be descendants of Anak.”

== See also ==
- Balor
- Laufey
