= Talmai =

Minor biblical figures

Talmai (/ˈtælmaɪ/, TAL-my; Hebrew: תלמי 'my furrows') is a name in the Bible referring to a number of minor people. Its Aramaic version was associated with the Greek Ptolemy (see that article for the list of corresponding names and surnames), and is the origin of Bartholomew. The name "Talmai" (Hebrew: תלמי) is often transliterated as "Tolmai" in Aramaic. While Bartholomew, one of the apostles, is referred to as "Bar-Tolmai," meaning "son of Tolmai," this connection is primarily etymological. It showcases the linguistic roots of the names rather than indicating a direct familial relationship between Bartholomew (the apostle) and the Nephilim.

== Talmai and his brothers, the Nephilim ==
Talmai, Ahiman and Sheshai were Nephilim, three giant sons of Anak whom Caleb and the spies saw in Mount Hebron (Book of Numbers 13:22) when they went in to explore the land. They were afterwards driven out and slain (Joshua 15:14; Judges 1:10).

== Talmai, king of Geshur ==
In the Hebrew Bible, Talmai was a king of Geshur. His daughter Maacah was a wife of King David, and the mother of Tamar and Absalom (2 Samuel 3:2–3). After killing his half-brother Amnon for raping Tamar, Absalom fled to Talmai in Geshur for three years (2 Samuel 13:28–38).
