= Dvir (name) =

Dvir (Hebrew: דביר) is a Hebrew given name and surname. Notable people with the name include:

== Given name ==
- Dvir Abramovich (born 1971), Israeli-Australian Jewish studies academic, columnist, and editor
- Dvir Benedek (born 1969), Israeli actor
- Dvir Sorek (died 2019), murder victim

== Surname ==
- Boaz Dvir (born 1967), Israeli-American professor, journalist, and filmmaker
- Uri Dvir, Israeli explorer and geographer
- Meir Dvir (1931-2018), Israeli physicist, CEO of Israel Aerospace Industries and Elscint

== Fictional characters ==
- Zohan Dvir, from comedy film You Don't Mess with the Zohan
