= Kenaz =

Kenaz (Hebrew: קְנָז Qənāz, "hunter") is the name of several persons in the Hebrew Bible.

- A son of Eliphaz, and a grandson of Esau. He was an Edomite leader. (Genesis 36:11, 15, 42). He may have been the ancestor of the Kenezites.
- Caleb's younger brother, and father of Othniel (Book of Joshua 15:17; Book of Judges 1:13; 1 Chronicles 4:13), whose Judahite family was of importance in Israel down to the time of David (1 Chronicles 27:15). Nothing more is said of Kenaz in the Hebrew Bible, but Pseudo-Philo (written c. AD 70) makes this Kenaz the first judge of Israel after Joshua, and includes several chapters of narrative about his supposed judgeship of 57 years.
- Caleb's grandson. (1 Chr. 4:15)
