= Debir =

Biblical name

Debir, devir, or dvir (Biblical Hebrew: דְּבִיר pronounced [dǝˈviːr]) may refer to:

== Names ==
- Debir King of Eglon, a Canaanite king of Eglon, slain by Joshua (Joshua 10). Aided by miracles, Joshua's army routed the Canaanite military, forcing Debir and the other kings to seek refuge in a cave. There they were trapped until later executed.

== Places ==
- A royal Canaanite city in the Judaean Mountains also known as Kirjath Sepher (Judges 1:11) and Kiriath-Sannah. (Joshua 15:49) Following the Israelite conquest, it became a Kohanic city. (Joshua 21:9) It is commonly identified with Khirbet Rabud southwest of Hebron. Claude Reignier Conder and Herbert Kitchener, 1st Earl Kitchener thought Debir, mentioned in Joshua 15:49 was ad-Dhahiriya.
- A site mentioned to be in the low plain of Achor. (Joshua 15:7) Though its exact location is not known, the name may have survived in Thogheret ed-Debr, southwest of Jericho.
- A location in Gilead, at the border of the Tribe of Gad, commonly believed to be the same as Lo-debar. (Joshua 13:26) Some identify the place with Umm ed-Dabar, 16 km (9.9 mi) south of the Sea of Galilee.

== Religion ==
- The debir (Biblical Hebrew: דְּבִיר, romanized: dəḇir), the innermost part of the Holy of Holies in Solomon's Temple
- According to the apocryphal text Lives of the Prophets, after the death of Zechariah ben Jehoiada, the priests of the Temple could no longer see the apparitions of the angels of the Lord, nor could make divinations with the Ephod, nor give responses from the Debir

== See also ==
- Tell Beit Mirsim
- Dvir (disambiguation)

== Bibliography ==
- Conder, C.R. (1879). Tent Work in Palestine. A Record of Discovery and Adventure. Vol. 2. London: Richard Bentley & Son (published for the Committee of the PEF). OCLC 23589738.
- Conder, C.R.; Kitchener, H.H. (1883). The Survey of Western Palestine: Memoirs of the Topography, Orography, Hydrography, and Archaeology. Vol. 3. London: Committee of the Palestine Exploration Fund.
