= Kenizzite =

Ancient tribe mentioned in the Bible

Kenizzite (Hebrew: קנזי, romanized: Qənizzî, also spelled Cenezite in the Douay–Rheims Bible) was an Edomite tribe referred to in the covenant God made with Abraham (Genesis 15:19). They are not mentioned among the other inhabitants of Canaan in Exodus 3:8 and Joshua 3:10 and probably inhabited some part of Arabia, in the confines of Syria.

The Kenizzites are identified in various ways according to different sources: The Midrash (Bereishit Rabbah) and the Jerusalem Talmud offer multiple views, including that the Kenizzites may be the Nabataeans, Edomites, or the people of Asia Minor (situated north of Israel). These interpretations indicate that the Kenizzites are not necessarily Canaanite nations, but could be other nations further from the Holy Land.

However, Abraham Ibn Ezra and Nahmanides suggest that the Kenizzites are the same as one of the sons of Canaan listed in Genesis 10, with names in Genesis 10 reflecting their original names and those in Genesis 15 representing their names in Abraham's time. According to this view, the Kenizzites' identity evolved, and they may be mentioned under different names. Finally, Rabbi Elijah Kramer of Vilna equates the Kenizzites with the Zemarites, thus aligning them with a specific group in the Holy Land's immediate vicinity.

In Numbers 32:12 Jephunneh, father of the Israelite leader Caleb, is called a Kenizzite.
