= Caleb =

Biblical character

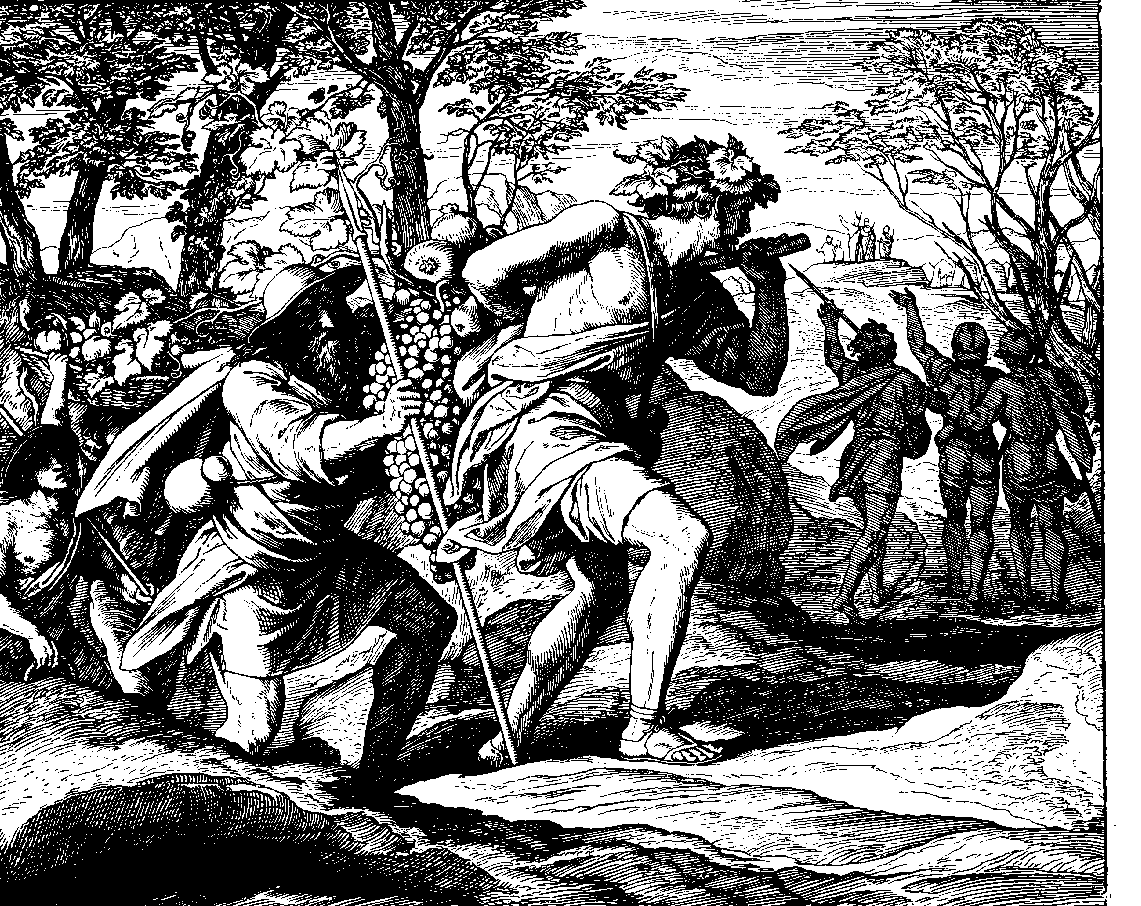
Return of the Spies, 1860 woodcut by Julius Schnorr von Karolsfeld

Caleb (/ˈkeɪləb/; Hebrew: כָּלֵב, Tiberian vocalization: Kālēḇ, Modern Israeli Hebrew: Kalév [kaˈlev]) is a figure who appears in the Hebrew Bible as a representative of the Tribe of Judah during the Israelites' journey to the Promised Land.

Following the Israelite conquest of Canaan, Caleb was described as a Kenizzite and is said to have received lands originally intended for the Tribe of Judah. The Calebites, his descendants, likely comprised a mixed population of Edomite and Judean elements. They resided in southern Judah and in the northern part of the Negev region.

A reference to him is also found in the Quran, although his name is not mentioned (Al-Ma'idah: 20–26).

== Name ==
Caleb is related to the Hebrew word for 'dog' (כֶּלֶב, keleḇ), with The Jewish Encyclopedia reporting that the animal is thought to be "the totem of a clan".

== Biblical account ==
Caleb, son of Jephunneh, was a member of the tribe of Judah (Book of Numbers, Numbers 13:6). His relationship to Caleb, son of Hezron, an earlier descendant of Judah (1 Chronicles 2:3–9) is unclear.

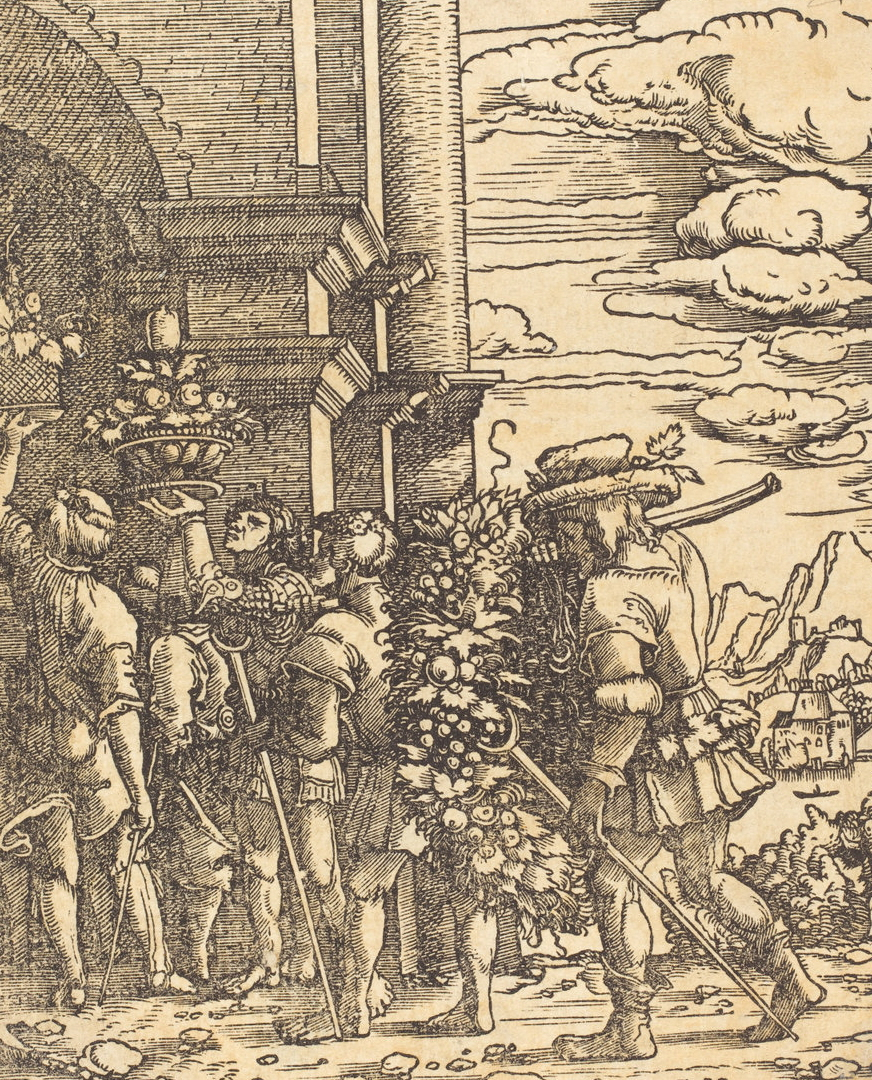
Joshua and Caleb carrying fruit of the Promised Land, woodcut circa 1480 by Albrecht Altdorfer

According to Numbers 13, Caleb, the son of Jephunneh, was one of the twelve spies sent by Moses into Canaan. Their task, over a period of 40 days, was to explore the Negev and surrounding area, and to make an assessment of the geographical features of the land, the strength and numbers of the population, the agricultural potential and actual performance of the land, settlement patterns (whether their cities were like camps or strongholds), and forestry conditions. Moses also asked them to be courageous and to return with samples of local produce.

In the Numbers 13 listing of the heads of each tribe, verse 6 reads "Of the tribe of Judah, Caleb the son of Jephunneh." Caleb's report balanced the appeal of the land and its fruits with the challenge of making a conquest.

Verse 30 of chapter 13 reads "And Caleb stilled the people toward Moses, and said: 'We should go up at once, and possess it; for we are well able to overcome it.'" Caleb and Joshua said the people should trust God and go into the land; the other ten spies, being fearful and rebellious, argued that conquering the land was impossible. They spread doubt and fear among all the people, who again wished to be back in Egypt (chapter 14 v 1-4).

=== Caleb as a Kenizzite ===
Caleb the spy is the son of Jephunneh. Jephunneh is called a Kenizzite (Numbers 32:12, Joshua 14:6,14). The Kenizzites are listed as one of the nations associated with the land of Canaan at the time that God made a covenant with Abraham (Genesis 15:19). However, Caleb is mentioned alongside the descendants of Judah recorded in 1 Chronicles 4: "And the sons of Caleb the son of Jephunneh: Iru, Elah, and Naam; and the sons of Elah: Kenaz" (1 Chronicles 4:15). Numbers 13:6, likewise, lists Caleb as a tribal leader in Judah. Contrarily, the Kenizzites are also generally associated with Kenaz, the son of Esau, making them an Edomite clan (see Genesis 36:40–43).

=== Deeds ===
In the aftermath of the conquest, Caleb asks Joshua to give him a mountain in property within the land of Judah, and Joshua blesses him as a sign of God's blessing and approval, giving him Hebron (Joshua 14). Since Hebron itself was one of the Cities of Refuge to be ruled by the Levites, it is later explained that Caleb actually was given the outskirts (Joshua 21:11–13). Caleb promised his daughter Achsah in marriage to whoever would conquer the land of Debir from the giants. This was eventually accomplished by Othniel Ben Kenaz, Caleb's nephew (Judges 1:13), who became Caleb's son-in-law as well (Joshua 15:16,17).

1 Samuel 25:3 states that Nabal, the husband of Abigail before David, was "a Calebite" (Hebrew klby). It is not stated whether this refers to one of the Calebs mentioned in the Bible, or another person bearing the same name.

== Traditional Jewish accounts ==
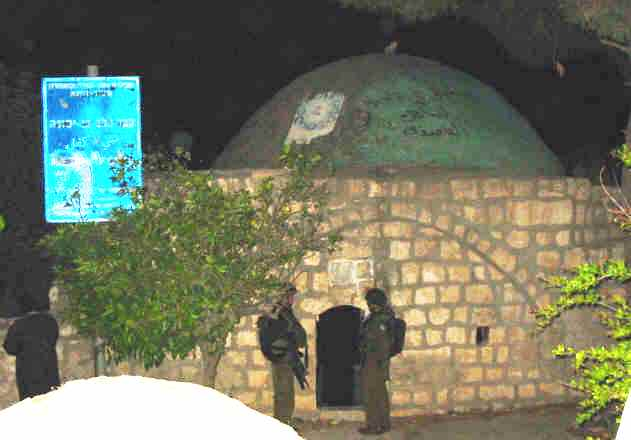
Traditional tomb of Caleb, Kifl Haris, one candidate for biblical Timnat Serah

Traditional Jewish sources record a number of stories about Caleb which expand on the biblical account. Jewish traditions identify Mered with Caleb, and his wife Bithiah with the princess who rescued Moses from the river.

One account records that Caleb wanted to bring produce from the land, but that the other spies discouraged him from doing so in order to avoid giving the Israelites a positive impression of Canaan. They only agreed to carry in samples of produce after Caleb brandished a sword and threatened to fight over the matter. A Midrash refers to Caleb being devoted to the Lord and to Moses, splitting from the other scouts to tour Hebron on his own and visit the graves of the Patriarchs. While in Canaan with the spies, Caleb's voice was so loud that he succeeded in saving the other spies by frightening giants away from them.

== Islam ==
Prophet Kālib Alayhi as-Salam
- كَالِبُ Caleb

Prophet of Islam
- Preceded by: Harun
- Succeeded by: Yusa bin Nun

Personal life
- Parent: Yufanna (father)

Religious life
- Religion: Islam

Caleb (Arabic: كَالِبُ بْنُ يُوفَنَّا, romanized: Kālib ibn Yūfannā) is referenced indirectly in the Qu'ran and some scholars consider him to be one of the Prophets of Islam, though this is debated. According to Tafsir ibn Kathir, he was one of the two men who feared to disobey Allah mentioned in Al-Ma'idah, the other person being Yusha ibn Nun.

== Bibliography ==
- Fokkelman, J. P. (1981). Narrative Art and Poetry in the Books of Samuel: A Full Interpretation Based on Stylistic and Structural Analyses. Assen: Van Gorcum. p. 482. ISBN 978-90-232-2175-3.
- Freedman, David Noel; Myers, Allen C. (2000). "Kenaz". Eerdmans Dictionary of the Bible. Amsterdam University Press. p. 763. ISBN 978-90-5356-503-2.
- Ginzberg, Louis (1911). Legends of the Jews: Bible Times and Characters from the Exodus to the Death of Moses. Volume III. Philadelphia: The Jewish Publication Society of America.
- Jastrow, Morris Jr.; Barton, George A.; Jastrow, Marcus; Ginzberg, Louis (1906). "Caleb". The Jewish Encyclopedia. Archived from the original on 30 October 2014.
- NAS Exhaustive Concordance, "Keleb"; Archived 31 July 2017 at the Wayback Machine, accessed 9 June 2017
