= Joshua 23 =

Book of Joshua, chapter 23

- ← chapter 22 chapter 24 →
- The pages containing the Book of Joshua in Leningrad Codex (1008 CE).
- Book: Book of Joshua
- Hebrew Bible part: Nevi'im
- Order in the Hebrew part: 1
- Category: Former Prophets
- Christian Bible part: Old Testament
- Order in the Christian part: 6

Joshua 23 is the twenty-third chapter of the Book of Joshua in the Hebrew Bible or in the Old Testament of the Christian Bible. According to Jewish tradition the book was attributed to Joshua, with additions by the high priests Eleazar and Phinehas, but modern scholars view it as part of the Deuteronomistic History, which spans the books of Deuteronomy to 2 Kings, attributed to nationalistic and devotedly Yahwistic writers during the time of the reformer Judean king Josiah in 7th century BCE. This chapter records the Joshua's farewell address to tribes of Israel, a part of a section comprising Joshua 22:1–24:33 about the Israelites preparing for life in the land of Canaan.

== Text ==
This chapter was originally written in the Hebrew language. It is divided into 16 verses.

=== Textual witnesses ===
Some early manuscripts containing the text of this chapter in Hebrew are of the Masoretic Text tradition, which includes the Codex Cairensis (895), Aleppo Codex (10th century), and Codex Leningradensis (1008).

Extant ancient manuscripts of a translation into Koine Greek known as the Septuagint (originally was made in the last few centuries BCE) include Codex Vaticanus (B; $\mathfrak{G}$^{B}; 4th century) and Codex Alexandrinus (A; $\mathfrak{G}$^{A}; 5th century). (Note: The whole book of Joshua is missing from the extant Codex Sinaiticus.)

== Analysis ==
Map of the land allotment of the tribes of Israel at the time of Joshua

The narrative of Israelites preparing for life in the land comprising verses 22:1 to 24:33 of the Book of Joshua and has the following outline:

A. The Jordan Altar (22:1–34)
B. Joshua's Farewell (23:1–16)

1. The Setting (23:1–2a)
2. The Assurance of the Allotment (23:2b–5)
3. Encouragement to Enduring Faithfulness (23:6–13)
4. The Certain Fulfillment of God's Word (23:14–16)

C. Covenant and Conclusion (24:1–33)

The book of Joshua is concluded with two distinct ceremonies, each seeming in itself to be a finale:

1. A farewell address of Joshua to the gathered tribes in an unnamed place (Joshua 23)
2. A covenant renewal ceremony at Shechem (Joshua 24)

== Joshua's Farewell (23:1–16) ==
Joshua's farewell address to the gathered Israel tribes in this chapter is linked to the narrative of conquest, connecting with the resumptive statements in Joshua 11:23 and 21:43–45 of the fulfilment of promise, complete conquest, and rest from war. The opening verse (1b) repeats word for word a phrase from Joshua 13:1 about Joshua's advanced age. The address warns the people to hold fast to the law of Moses (verse 6; cf. Joshua 1:7), and to 'love' YHWH himself (verse 11, cf. Deuteronomy 6:5—the term 'love' denotes 'covenant loyalty'). They must not copy the worship practices of the native peoples that still lived among them (verses 7, 16), nor intermarry with them (verse 12; cf. Deuteronomy 7:1–5). If they do, YHWH will cease to drive out the nations, and Israel people themselves will be driven off their acquired land (verses 15, 16; cf. Deuteronomy 30:17–18). Here Joshua states the two possibilities of the covenant: "faithfulness and possession", or "unfaithfulness and loss", as a choice with its consequences (cf. Deuteronomy 28). Furthermore, Joshua warns that the 'curses' of the covenant will certainly come (verse 15b; cf. Deuteronomy 4:25–31; 30:1–5).

== See also ==
- Canaan
- Children of Israel
- Great sea
- Idolatry
- Jordan River
- Moses
- Tabernacle
- Torah
- Related Bible parts: Joshua 11, Joshua 21

== Sources ==
- Beal, Lissa M. Wray (2019). Longman, Tremper III; McKnight, Scot (eds.). Joshua. The Story of God Bible Commentary. Zondervan Academic. ISBN 978-0310490838.
- Coogan, Michael David (2007). Coogan, Michael David; Brettler, Marc Zvi; Newsom, Carol Ann; Perkins, Pheme (eds.). The New Oxford Annotated Bible with the Apocryphal/Deuterocanonical Books: New Revised Standard Version, Issue 48 (Augmented 3rd ed.). Oxford University Press. ISBN 978-0195288810.
- Firth, David G. (2021). Joshua: Evangelical Biblical Theology Commentary. Evangelical Biblical Theology Commentary (EBTC) (illustrated ed.). Lexham Press. ISBN 9781683594406.
- Halley, Henry H. (1965). Halley's Bible Handbook: an abbreviated Bible commentary (24th (revised) ed.). Zondervan Publishing House. ISBN 0-310-25720-4.
- Harstad, Adolph L. (2004). Joshua. Concordia Publishing House. ISBN 978-0570063193.
- Hayes, Christine (2015). Introduction to the Bible. Yale University Press. ISBN 978-0300188271.
- Hubbard, Robert L (2009). Joshua. The NIV Application Commentary. Zondervan. ISBN 978-0310209348.
- McConville, Gordon (2007). "9. Joshua". In Barton, John; Muddiman, John (eds.). The Oxford Bible Commentary (first (paperback) ed.). Oxford University Press. pp. 158–176. ISBN 978-0199277186.
- Rösel, Hartmut N. (2011). Joshua. Historical commentary on the Old Testament. Vol. 6 (illustrated ed.). Peeters. ISBN 978-9042925922.
- Webb, Barry G. (2012). The Book of Judges. New International Commentary on the Old Testament. Eerdmans Publishing Company. ISBN 9780802826282.
- Würthwein, Ernst (1995). The Text of the Old Testament. Translated by Rhodes, Erroll F. Grand Rapids, MI: Wm. B. Eerdmans. ISBN 0-8028-0788-7.
