= Joshua 12 =

Book of Joshua, chapter 12

- ← chapter 11 chapter 13 →
- The pages containing the Book of Joshua in Leningrad Codex (1008 CE).
- Book: Book of Joshua
- Hebrew Bible part: Nevi'im
- Order in the Hebrew part: 1
- Category: Former Prophets
- Christian Bible part: Old Testament
- Order in the Christian part: 6

Joshua 12 is the twelfth chapter of the Book of Joshua in the Hebrew Bible or in the Old Testament of the Christian Bible. According to Jewish tradition the book was attributed to Joshua, with additions by the high priests Eleazar and Phinehas. However, modern scholars view it as part of the Deuteronomistic History, which spans the books of Deuteronomy to 2 Kings, which are attributed to nationalistic and devotedly Yahwistic writers who were active during the time of the reformer Judean king Josiah in 7th century BCE. This chapter records the list of kings defeated by the Israelites under the leadership of Moses and Joshua. It is part of a section about the conquest of Canaan which comprises Joshua 5:13–12:24.

== Text ==
This chapter was originally written in the Hebrew language. It is divided into 24 verses.

=== Textual witnesses ===
Some early manuscripts containing the text of this chapter in Hebrew are of the Masoretic Text tradition, which includes the Codex Cairensis (895), Aleppo Codex (10th century), and Codex Leningradensis (1008).

Extant ancient manuscripts of a translation into Koine Greek known as the Septuagint (originally was made in the last few centuries BCE) include Codex Vaticanus (B; $\mathfrak{G}$^{B}; 4th century) and Codex Alexandrinus (A; $\mathfrak{G}$^{A}; 5th century). (Note: The whole book of Joshua is missing from the extant Codex Sinaiticus.)

== Analysis ==
The narrative of the Israelites conquering the land of Canaan comprises verses 5:13 to 12:24 of the Book of Joshua and has the following outline:

A. Jericho (5:13–6:27)
B. Achan and Ai (7:1–8:29)
C. Renewal at Mount Ebal (8:30–35)
D. The Gibeonite Deception (9:1–27)
E. The Campaign in the South (10:1–43)
F. The Campaign in the North and Summary List of Kings (11:1–12:24)

1. Victory over the Northern Alliance (11:1-15)

a. The Northern Alliance (11:1-5)
b. Divine Reassurance (11:6)
c. Victory at Merom (11:7-9)
d. Destruction of Hazor (11:10–11)
e. Summation of Obedience and Victory (11:12–15)

2. Summaries of Taking the Land (11:16-12:24)

a. Taking the Land (11:16-20)
b. Extermination of the Anakim (11:21-22)
c. Narrative Pivot: Taking and Allotting (11:23)
d. Capture of Land and Kings (12:1-24)

i. East of the Jordan (12:1-6)
ii. West of the Jordan (12:7-24)

Chapter 12 provides the closing the account of Israel's conquest of the territory in both Transjordan (verses 1–6) and Cisjordan (verses 7–24), as 'the promises land', which comprises lands allocated to all tribes of Israel.

== Kings defeated east of the Jordan (12:1–6) ==
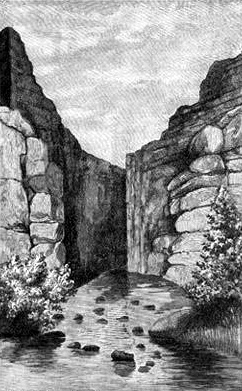
Arnon river near its mouth. From Stade, "Geschichte des Volkes Israel."

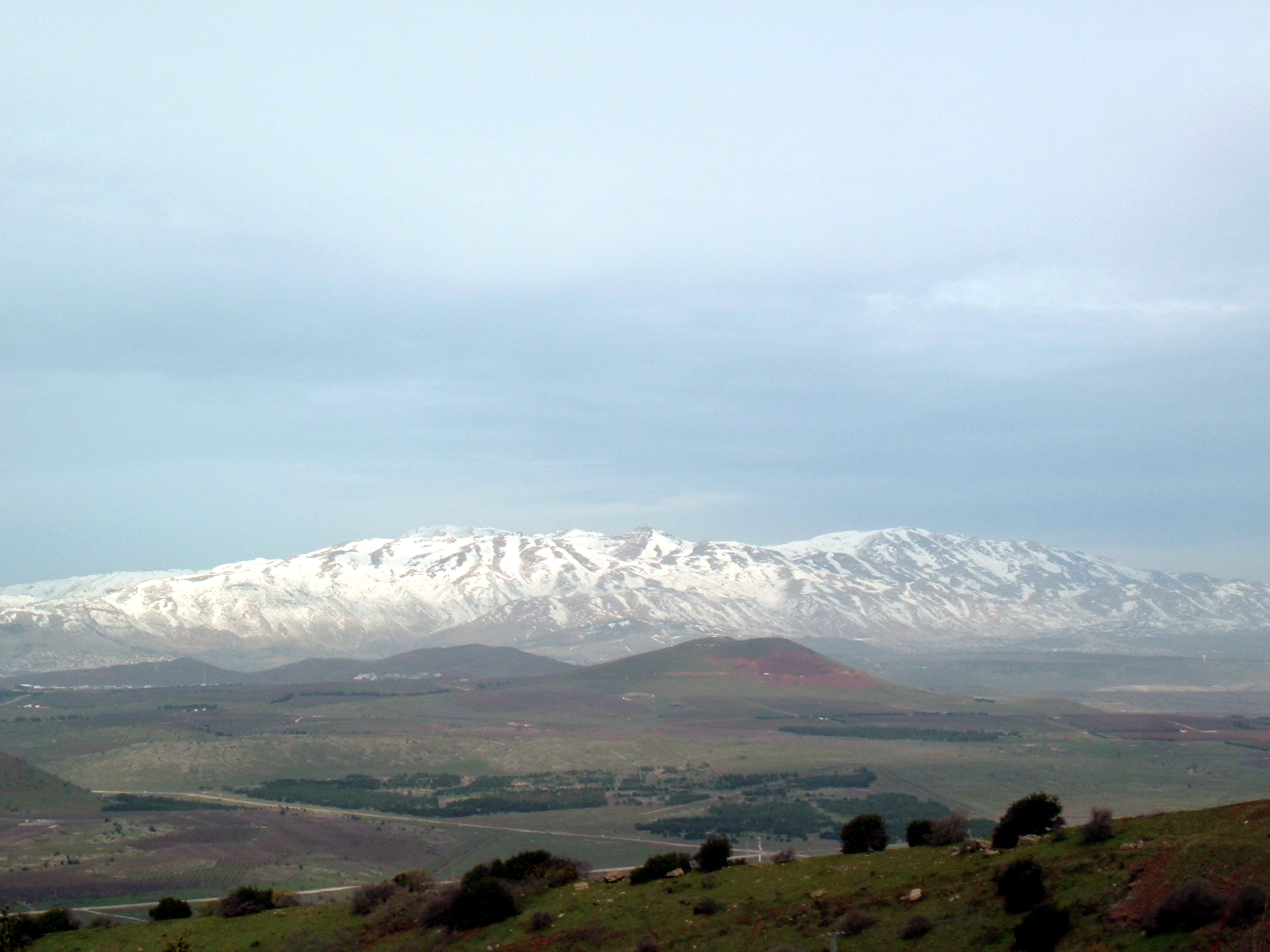
Mount Hermon, viewed from the south (Mount Bental in the Golan Heights)

This section recalls once again the victories in Transjordan (cf. Joshua 1:12-15; Numbers 21; Deuteronomy 2–3), especially mentioning that the herem ("ban" or holy war) was applied there first (Deuteronomy 2:34; 3:6). The two defeated kings in Transjordan were Sihon of Heshbon and Og of Bashan. Sihon's territory extended from the river Arnon —running from the east into the Dead Sea, and forming the northern boundary of Moab — northwards along the east bank of the Jordan River to its next major tributary, the Jabbok (where Jacob had wrestled with God; Genesis 32:22–32), including a stretch of the Arabah well to the north of the Jabbok, east of "Chinneroth" (= Sea of Galilee), and eastwards to the Ammonites' borderland. Og's territory lay to the north and east of Sihon's, with two major cities, Ashtaroth and Edrei, in the east of the Sea of Galilee. By taking both territories, Moses took all the Transjordan from the Arnon (river) to (mount) Hermon, then distributed it to the tribes of Reuben and Gad, and half the tribe of Manasseh (cf. Numbers 32: Deuteronomy 2–3).

=== Verse 1 ===
Now these are the kings of the land whom the people of Israel defeated and took possession of their land beyond the Jordan toward the sunrise, from the Valley of the Arnon to Mount Hermon, with all the Arabah eastward:

The Transjordanian territory of Israel is defined by the Arnon river (Seil el-Mojib (Wadi Mujib) in the south and Mount Hermon in the north.

== Kings defeated west of the Jordan (12:7–24) ==
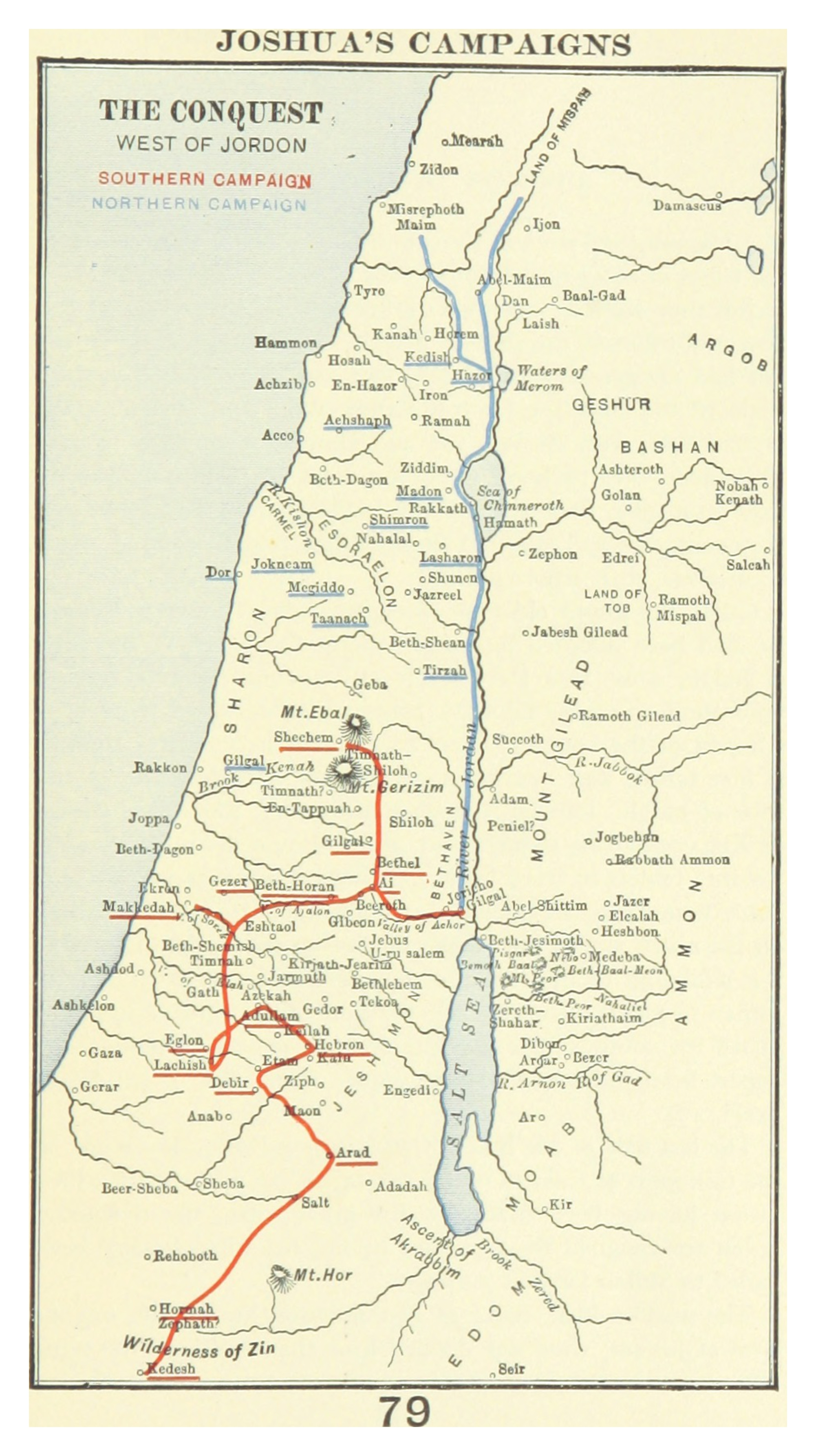
Map of Joshua's conquest in Canaan; red line: southern regions, blue line: northern regions. 1899. British Library HMNTS 010077.f.24.

This section lists Joshua's conquests in the territory west of the Jordan, against the nations which were there (Deuteronomy 1:7; 7:1; Joshua 11:16–17), to continue the land possession and promise fulfillment that Moses had started. The conquered area is reported to span from Baal-gad in the north and Mount Halak in the south (cf. Joshua 11:17), followed by the list of the defeated kings of cities, roughly followed the progress of the conquest: first, Jericho and Ai, then the southern alliance under the king of Jerusalem, and the northern alliance under the king of Hazor. Among some new city names —Geder, Hormah, Arad, Adullam, Tappuah, Hepher, Aphek, Lasharon, Taanach, Megiddo, Kedesh, Jokneam, Tirzah— Arad, on the southern borders of Judah, is known with its temple to YHWH, and Megiddo was an important fortress on the north-south route, guarding the 'entrance to the plain of Esdraelon'. "Bethel" in verse 16 (not listed in Septuagint) is mentioned in verse 9, but the city of Bethel is recorded to fall to the 'house of Joseph' in Judges 1:22–25, 'after the death of Joshua' (Judges 1:1). The recurrence of the 'kings' implies the significance of YHWH's empowerment of Joshua, who is not a king, to defeat the kings of Canaan.

=== Verses 7–8 ===
^{7}And these are the kings of the land whom Joshua and the people of Israel defeated on the west side of the Jordan, from Baal-gad in the Valley of Lebanon to Mount Halak, that rises toward Seir (and Joshua gave their land to the tribes of Israel as a possession according to their allotments, ^{8}in the hill country, in the lowland, in the Arabah, in the slopes, in the wilderness, and in the Negeb, the land of the Hittites, the Amorites, the Canaanites, the Perizzites, the Hivites, and the Jebusites):

The geographical description matches those in Joshua 11:17, but here it is presented in order from north to south.

== See also ==
- Achshaph
- Adullam
- Ai
- Ammon
- Amorites
- Aphek
- Arad
- Aroer
- Ashdoth-pisgah
- Ashtaroth
- Baal-gad
- Bashan
- Bethel
- Beth-horon
- Beth-jeshimoth
- Canaanite
- Carmel
- Children of Israel
- Chinneroth
- Debir (city)
- Dor
- Edrei
- Eglon
- Geder
- Geshur
- Gezer
- Gilead
- Gilgal
- Hazor
- Hebron
- Hepher
- Heshbon
- Hittites
- Hivites
- Hormah
- Israelites
- River Jabbok
- Jarmuth
- Jebusite
- Jericho
- Jerusalem
- Jokneam
- Jordan River
- Kedesh
- Lachish
- Lasharon
- Lebanon
- Libnah
- Maachathi
- Madon
- Makkedah
- Megiddo
- Merom
- Misrephoth-maim
- Mizpeh
- Moses
- Mount Hermon
- Seir
- Negev
- Perizzites
- Salcah
- Shimron-meron
- Sidon
- Taanach
- Tirzah
- Tribe of Gad
- Tribe of Manasseh
- Tribe of Reuben
- Related Bible parts: Numbers 21; Deuteronomy 2, Deuteronomy 3; Joshua 1, Joshua 10, Joshua 11

== Sources ==
- Beal, Lissa M. Wray (2019). Longman, Tremper III; McKnight, Scot (eds.). Joshua. The Story of God Bible Commentary. Zondervan Academic. ISBN 978-0310490838.
- Coogan, Michael David (2007). Coogan, Michael David; Brettler, Marc Zvi; Newsom, Carol Ann; Perkins, Pheme (eds.). The New Oxford Annotated Bible with the Apocryphal/Deuterocanonical Books: New Revised Standard Version, Issue 48 (Augmented 3rd ed.). Oxford University Press. ISBN 978-0195288810.
- Firth, David G. (2021). Joshua: Evangelical Biblical Theology Commentary. Evangelical Biblical Theology Commentary (EBTC) (illustrated ed.). Lexham Press. ISBN 9781683594406.
- Halley, Henry H. (1965). Halley's Bible Handbook: an abbreviated Bible commentary (24th (revised) ed.). Zondervan Publishing House. ISBN 0-310-25720-4.
- Harstad, Adolph L. (2004). Joshua. Concordia Publishing House. ISBN 978-0570063193.
- Hayes, Christine (2015). Introduction to the Bible. Yale University Press. ISBN 978-0300188271.
- Hubbard, Robert L (2009). Joshua. The NIV Application Commentary. Zondervan. ISBN 978-0310209348.
- McConville, Gordon (2007). "9. Joshua". In Barton, John; Muddiman, John (eds.). The Oxford Bible Commentary (first (paperback) ed.). Oxford University Press. pp. 158–176. ISBN 978-0199277186.
- Rösel, Hartmut N. (2011). Joshua. Historical commentary on the Old Testament. Vol. 6 (illustrated ed.). Peeters. ISBN 978-9042925922.
- Würthwein, Ernst (1995). The Text of the Old Testament. Translated by Rhodes, Erroll F. Grand Rapids, MI: Wm. B. Eerdmans. ISBN 0-8028-0788-7.
