= Anab =

Biblical city

Coordinates: 31.403832°N 34.944334°E

Anab (Hebrew: עֲנָב, romanized: ‘Ǎnāḇ, Anav) is a city mentioned in the Hebrew Bible. It is mentioned in the Book of Joshua as one of the cities in the Judaean Mountains from which Joshua expelled the Anakim.

== In the Hebrew Bible ==
Anav is mentioned in Joshua 11:21:

At that time, Joshua went and wiped out the Anakites from the hill country, from Hebron, Debir, and Anab, from the entire hill country of Judah, and from the entire hill country of Israel; Joshua proscribed them and their towns.

Later, Joshua 15:50 lists Anav as one of several sites incorporated into the hilly parts of the territory of the Tribe of Judah.

== In later sources ==
Anab was mentioned in a Jewish document, written in Hebrew, self-dated to the "4th year after the destruction of the house of Israel", which scholars put at 140 CE, four years after the Roman suppression of the Bar Kokhba revolt.

== Archeology ==
Anav is identified with today's Khirbet Anab. It lies among the Hebron Hills, 10 mi (16 km) south-south-west of Hebron, in the West Bank.

'Anab al-Kabir used to be a sizeable village with 60 taxpayers, as noted by Hütteroth and Abdulfattah. The cause of its destruction remains unknown. Currently, it is occupied by Bedouins from the Ramad'in tribe, who likely settled there during the Jordanian control of the West Bank (1948–1967).

A basilical-shaped church with Greek and Christian Palestinian Aramaic inscriptions was found at the site. The entire complex is 38 x 20 meters. Mosaic floors were discovered throughout the site; they suffered iconoclastic destruction during the early Islamic period (c. 8th century CE). The rooms of the complex were used for habitation during the Mamluk period in the 13th and 14th centuries.
