= Helbah =

Helbah is a town of the tribe of Asher (Judges 1:31), in the plain of Phoenicia:

Asher did not drive out the inhabitants of Acco, or the inhabitants of Sidon, or of Ahlab, or of Achzib, or of Helbah, or of Aphik, or of Rehob; but the Asherites dwelt among the Canaanites, the inhabitants of the land; for they did not drive them out.

— Judges 1:31-32 in the Revised Standard Version
