= Joshua 22 =

Book of Joshua, chapter 22

- ← chapter 21 chapter 23 →
- The pages containing the Book of Joshua in Leningrad Codex (1008 CE).
- Book: Book of Joshua
- Hebrew Bible part: Nevi'im
- Order in the Hebrew part: 1
- Category: Former Prophets
- Christian Bible part: Old Testament
- Order in the Christian part: 6

Joshua 22 is the twenty-second chapter of the Book of Joshua in the Hebrew Bible or in the Old Testament of the Christian Bible. According to Jewish tradition the book was attributed to Joshua, with additions by the high priests Eleazar and Phinehas, but modern scholars view it as part of the Deuteronomistic History, which spans the books of Deuteronomy to 2 Kings, attributed to nationalistic and devotedly Yahwistic writers during the time of the reformer Judean king Josiah in 7th century BCE. This chapter records the mediation for the issue of the establishment of an altar on the east back of Jordan River, a part of a section comprising Joshua 22:1–24:33 about the Israelites preparing for life in the land of Canaan.

== Text ==
This chapter was originally written in the Hebrew language. It is divided into 34 verses.

=== Textual witnesses ===
Some early manuscripts containing the text of this chapter in Hebrew are of the Masoretic Text tradition, which includes the Codex Cairensis (895), Aleppo Codex (10th century), and Codex Leningradensis (1008).

Extant ancient manuscripts of a translation into Koine Greek known as the Septuagint (originally was made in the last few centuries BCE) include Codex Vaticanus (B; $\mathfrak{G}$^{B}; 4th century) and Codex Alexandrinus (A; $\mathfrak{G}$^{A}; 5th century). (Note: The whole book of Joshua is missing from the extant Codex Sinaiticus.)

== Analysis ==
Map of the land allotment of the tribes of Israel at the time of Joshua

The narrative of Israelites preparing for life in the land comprising verses 22:1 to 24:33 of the Book of Joshua and has the following outline:

A. The Jordan Altar (22:1–34)

1. Joshua's Charge to the East Jordan Tribes (22:1–8)
2 The Construction of the Altar and a Possible Civil War (22:9–12)
3. Meeting Between Phinehas and the East Jordan Tribes (22:13–29)

a. Phinehas Challenges the East Jordan Tribes (22:13–20)
b. The East Jordan Tribes Explain (22:21–29)

4. Phinehas Returns to the West (22:30–32)
5. The Altar Named (22:33–34)

B. Joshua's Farewell (23:1–16)
C. Covenant and Conclusion (24:1–33)

== The altar by the Jordan (22:1–12) ==
Still at Shiloh Joshua addressed the Transjordanian tribes who at outset of the conquest were obliged to participate with them in the war for the land although they had settled in their lands before their fellow-Israelites had crossed the Jordan (Joshua 1:12–18; cf. Deuteronomy 3:18–20 for the reference to Moses' command in verse 2). After the completion of the conquest and land distribution, they were now permitted to return home, with a strong exhortation (verses. 2–5; cf Deuteronomy 10:12–13) to be faithful to God and with Joshua's 'blessing' of them (verse 6). However, the unity of the people was soon called into question when those two and a half tribes, on their return, erected an altar by the Jordan, on the Israelite side of the border between the two lands (verses 10–11) and this was interpreted by the Cisjordan Israelites as an act of war, because it apparently challenged the claims of the unified sanctuary of Shiloh (verse 12).

== The Altar of Witness (22:13–34) ==
The case against the two and a half tribes is outlined in terms of holiness requirements (verses. 13–20), so the priest Phinehas (son of Eleazar), rather than Joshua, was sent to talk to those tribes. The alleged sin from building the altar, whether it might make the land across the Jordan to be ritually 'unclean', and therefore unfit for worship (verse 19)., is compared with two other sins in the religious realm (verses 17, 20):

1. the idolatry at Peor in the time of the wilderness wanderings (Numbers 25), and
2. Achan's transgression of the ban on Jericho (Joshua 7).

It is the duty of all Israel, as a religious assembly or congregation, to pursue the errant tribes (verses 12, 16).

The Transjordan tribes responded by recognizing the unique claims of both YHWH and his altar (22:21–29) using the phrase 'The LORD, God of gods' ('el 'elohim YHWH) to emphasize a strong affirmation of YHWH's supremacy and the argument that this altar was not itself for sacrifice, but rather, as a copy of the true altar, to symbolize their participation in the worship even when they were on the other side of the Jordan (verse 27a). Thus the altar is named 'witness' (verses 28, 34), for the unity of Israel as well as the preservation of the true faith for future generations (verses. 24–28; cf. Deuteronomy 6:2, 7).

== See also ==
- Bashan
- Blessing
- Brass
- Canaan
- Cattle
- Children of Israel
- Ed (altar)
- Gift offering
- Gilead
- Gold
- Iron
- Jordan River
- Kohen
- Korban
- Levite
- Moses
- Silver
- Slaughter offering
- Tabernacle
- Tribe of Gad
- Tribe of Manasseh
- Tribe of Reuben
- Zerah
- Related Bible parts: Numbers 32, Joshua 1

== Sources ==
- Beal, Lissa M. Wray (2019). Longman, Tremper III; McKnight, Scot (eds.). Joshua. The Story of God Bible Commentary. Zondervan Academic. ISBN 978-0310490838.
- Coogan, Michael David (2007). Coogan, Michael David; Brettler, Marc Zvi; Newsom, Carol Ann; Perkins, Pheme (eds.). The New Oxford Annotated Bible with the Apocryphal/Deuterocanonical Books: New Revised Standard Version, Issue 48 (Augmented 3rd ed.). Oxford University Press. ISBN 978-0195288810.
- Firth, David G. (2021). Joshua: Evangelical Biblical Theology Commentary. Evangelical Biblical Theology Commentary (EBTC) (illustrated ed.). Lexham Press. ISBN 9781683594406.
- Halley, Henry H. (1965). Halley's Bible Handbook: an abbreviated Bible commentary (24th (revised) ed.). Zondervan Publishing House. ISBN 0-310-25720-4.
- Harstad, Adolph L. (2004). Joshua. Concordia Publishing House. ISBN 978-0570063193.
- Hayes, Christine (2015). Introduction to the Bible. Yale University Press. ISBN 978-0300188271.
- Hubbard, Robert L (2009). Joshua. The NIV Application Commentary. Zondervan. ISBN 978-0310209348.
- McConville, Gordon (2007). "9. Joshua". In Barton, John; Muddiman, John (eds.). The Oxford Bible Commentary (first (paperback) ed.). Oxford University Press. pp. 158–176. ISBN 978-0199277186.
- Rösel, Hartmut N. (2011). Joshua. Historical commentary on the Old Testament. Vol. 6 (illustrated ed.). Peeters. ISBN 978-9042925922.
- Webb, Barry G. (2012). The Book of Judges. New International Commentary on the Old Testament. Eerdmans Publishing Company. ISBN 9780802826282.
- Würthwein, Ernst (1995). The Text of the Old Testament. Translated by Rhodes, Erroll F. Grand Rapids, MI: Wm. B. Eerdmans. ISBN 0-8028-0788-7.
