= Joshua 21 =

Book of Joshua, chapter 21

- ← chapter 20 chapter 22 →
- The pages containing the Book of Joshua in Leningrad Codex (1008 CE).
- Book: Book of Joshua
- Hebrew Bible part: Nevi'im
- Order in the Hebrew part: 1
- Category: Former Prophets
- Christian Bible part: Old Testament
- Order in the Christian part: 6

Joshua 21 is the twenty-first chapter of the Book of Joshua in the Hebrew Bible or in the Old Testament of the Christian Bible. According to 0Jewish tradition the book was attributed to Joshua, with additions by the high priests Eleazar and Phinehas, but modern scholars view it as part of the Deuteronomistic History, which spans the books of Deuteronomy to 2 Kings, attributed to nationalistic and devotedly Yahwistic writers during the time of the reformer Judean king Josiah in 7th century BCE. This chapter records the designation of "Levitical cities", a part of a section comprising Joshua 13:1–21:45 about the Israelites allotting the land of Canaan.

== Text ==
This chapter was originally written in the Hebrew language. It is divided into 45 verses.

=== Textual witnesses ===
Some early manuscripts containing the text of this chapter in Hebrew are of the Masoretic Text tradition, which includes the Codex Cairensis (895), Aleppo Codex (10th century), and Codex Leningradensis (1008).

Extant ancient manuscripts of a translation into Koine Greek known as the Septuagint (originally was made in the last few centuries BCE) include Codex Vaticanus (B; $\mathfrak{G}$^{B}; 4th century) and Codex Alexandrinus (A; $\mathfrak{G}$^{A}; 5th century). (Note: The whole book of Joshua is missing from the extant Codex Sinaiticus.)

=== Old Testament references ===
- Joshua 21:1–42: Numbers 35:1–8; 1 Chronicles 6:54–81

== Analysis ==
Map of the land allotment of the tribes of Israel at the time of Joshua

The narrative of Israelites allotting the land of Canaan comprising verses 13:1 to 21:45 of the Book of Joshua and has the following outline:

A. Preparations for Distributing the Land (13:1–14:15)
B. The Allotment for Judah (15:1–63)
C. The Allotment for Joseph (16:1–17:18)
D. Land Distribution at Shiloh (18:1–19:51)
E. Levitical Distribution and Conclusion (20:1–21:45)

1. Cities of Refuge (20:1–9)

a. Regulations for Cities of Refuge (20:1–6)
b. Designation of Cities of Refuge (20:7–9)

2. Levitical Cities (21:1–42)

a. Approach to Joshua and Eleazar (21:1–3)
b. Initial Summary (21:4–8)
c. Priestly Kohathite Allotment (21:9–19)
d. Non-Priestly Kohathite Allotment (21:20–26)
e. Gershonite Allotment (21:27–33)
f. Merarite Allotment (21:34–40)
g. Levitical Summary (21:41–42)

3. Summary of Divine Faithfulness (21:43–45)

== Levitical cities (21:1–42) ==
It is now the turn of the Levites to be granted their part of the land by Joshua and Eleazar at Shiloh (verses 1–2). The Levites' 'inheritance' is YHWH himself (Numbers 18:20; Deuteronomy 18:1-2, cf Deuteronomy 10:9; in practice, they would receive shares of the Israelites' sacrifices and offerings; Numbers 18:9–24), so they would not receive tribal territory (13:14; 14:3–4) but only towns and their pasturelands throughout Israel (verses 1–3), a total of forty-eight Levitical cities (Numbers 35), including the six cities of refuge (Numbers 35:6–7—all noted in Joshua 21; verses 11, 21, 27, 32, 36, 38). The cities may have mainly 'served as residences and places where Levites could enjoy some personal wealth and status, while performing their priestly duties elsewhere' (Deuteronomy 18:6–8; Judges 18:3-6).

Cities were given out of the other tribes by lot to the Levites, according to their division:

- The priests of the Kohathites, the children of Aaron (21:1–8): 13 cities from the tribes of Judah, Simeon, and Benjamin.
- The Levites of the Kohathites (21:9–19): 10 cities from the tribes of Ephraim, Dan, and the half-tribe of Manasseh (Western Manasseh).
- The Gershonites (21:20–26): 13 cities from the tribes of Issachar, Asher, Naphtali, and the half-tribe of Manasseh in Bashan (Eastern Manasseh).
- The Merarites (21:27–33): 12 cities from the tribes of Reuben, Gad, and Zebulun

== Summary of Divine Faithfulness (21:43–45) ==
The summarizing conclusion notes the promise fulfilment and rest from enemies (cf. Joshua 11:23). These verses close the division record of the land, and tied the two halves of the Book together (chapter 1–12 and chapter 13–21): The declarations of these verses is consist to the fact that the Israelites had not yet possessed all the cities allotted to the various tribes (Judges 1:21–36) nor at any time subdued the whole country promised to them (Numbers 34:1–12), because God intends that the native population should not be annihilated suddenly (Deuteronomy 7:22), but at this time the Canaanites were broken in strength, holding isolated spots in the very midst of the tribes of God's people, so overall, the conquest of Canaan was 'already "ex parte Dei" a perfect work'.

== See also ==
- Anakim
- Caleb
- Cattle
- Children of Israel
- Cities of Refuge
- Jephunneh
- Jordan River
- Kohen
- Levite
- Manslaughter
- Moses
- Nun
- Tribe of Asher
- Tribe of Benjamin
- Tribe of Dan
- Tribe of Ephraim
- Tribe of Gad
- Tribe of Issachar
- Tribe of Judah
- Tribe of Manasseh
- Tribe of Naphtali
- Tribe of Reuben
- Tribe of Simeon
- Tribe of Zebulun
- Tribal allotments of Israel
- Related Bible parts: Numbers 35, Deuteronomy 4, Deuteronomy 19, Joshua 20

== Sources ==
- Beal, Lissa M. Wray (2019). Longman, Tremper III; McKnight, Scot (eds.). Joshua. The Story of God Bible Commentary. Zondervan Academic. ISBN 978-0310490838.
- Coogan, Michael David (2007). Coogan, Michael David; Brettler, Marc Zvi; Newsom, Carol Ann; Perkins, Pheme (eds.). The New Oxford Annotated Bible with the Apocryphal/Deuterocanonical Books: New Revised Standard Version, Issue 48 (Augmented 3rd ed.). Oxford University Press. ISBN 978-0195288810.
- Firth, David G. (2021). Joshua: Evangelical Biblical Theology Commentary. Evangelical Biblical Theology Commentary (EBTC) (illustrated ed.). Lexham Press. ISBN 9781683594406.
- Halley, Henry H. (1965). Halley's Bible Handbook: an abbreviated Bible commentary (24th (revised) ed.). Zondervan Publishing House. ISBN 0-310-25720-4.
- Harstad, Adolph L. (2004). Joshua. Concordia Publishing House. ISBN 978-0570063193.
- Hayes, Christine (2015). Introduction to the Bible. Yale University Press. ISBN 978-0300188271.
- Hubbard, Robert L (2009). Joshua. The NIV Application Commentary. Zondervan. ISBN 978-0310209348.
- McConville, Gordon (2007). "9. Joshua". In Barton, John; Muddiman, John (eds.). The Oxford Bible Commentary (first (paperback) ed.). Oxford University Press. pp. 158–176. ISBN 978-0199277186.
- Rösel, Hartmut N. (2011). Joshua. Historical commentary on the Old Testament. Vol. 6 (illustrated ed.). Peeters. ISBN 978-9042925922.
- Webb, Barry G. (2012). The Book of Judges. New International Commentary on the Old Testament. Eerdmans Publishing Company. ISBN 9780802826282.
- Würthwein, Ernst (1995). The Text of the Old Testament. Translated by Rhodes, Erroll F. Grand Rapids, MI: Wm. B. Eerdmans. ISBN 0-8028-0788-7.
