= Judges 2 =

Book of Judges, chapter 2

- ← chapter 1 chapter 3 →
- The pages containing the Book of Judges in Leningrad Codex (1008 CE).
- Book: Book of Judges
- Hebrew Bible part: Nevi'im
- Order in the Hebrew part: 2
- Category: Former Prophets
- Christian Bible part: Old Testament (Heptateuch)
- Order in the Christian part: 7

Judges 2 is the second chapter of the Book of Judges in the Old Testament or the Hebrew Bible. According to Jewish tradition the book was attributed to the prophet Samuel, but modern scholars view it as part of the Deuteronomistic History, which spans the books of Deuteronomy to 2 Kings, attributed to nationalistic and devotedly Yahwistic writers during the time of the reformer Judean king Josiah in 7th century BCE. This chapter focuses on the military failure and apostasy of the Israelites following the introduction in the first chapter.

== Text ==
This chapter was originally written in the Hebrew language. It is divided into 23 verses.

=== Textual witnesses ===
Some early manuscripts containing the text of this chapter in Hebrew are of the Masoretic Text tradition, which includes the Codex Cairensis (895), Aleppo Codex (10th century), and Codex Leningradensis (1008).

Extant ancient manuscripts of a translation into Koine Greek known as the Septuagint (originally was made in the last few centuries BCE) include Codex Vaticanus (B; $\mathfrak{G}$^{B}; 4th century) and Codex Alexandrinus (A; $\mathfrak{G}$^{A}; 5th century). (Note: The whole book of Judges is missing from the extant Codex Sinaiticus.)

=== Old Testament references ===
- Judges 2:6–8: Joshua 24:29–33
- Judges 2:10–23: Isaiah 43:22–28; Jeremiah 2:23–37

== Angel of the Lord at Bochim (2:1–5) ==
This brief section about a theophany serves as a connecting link between the previous and the subsequent chapters, responding to the Israelites' request for divine guidance in Judges 1:1 with a reminder about God's covenantal promise to give Israel the land (back to the era of the patriarchs) being kept faithfully as witnessed by the redemption from Egypt (Judges 2:1), but the future of the covenant was conditional to the faithfulness of Israel, as a covenant partner, to YHWH alone. The failure to drive out the enemy described in 1:28–36 were not really because of military weakness (1:19), but due to the unfaithfulness of Israel to the covenant (2:2–3). People's reaction to these harsh predictions provides the etymology for the place where the angel appeared (2:4–5).

=== Verse 1 ===
Then the Angel of the LORD came up from Gilgal to Bochim, and said: "I led you up from Egypt and brought you to the land of which I swore to your fathers; and I said, 'I will never break My covenant with you'"

- "The Angel of the Lord": from Hebrew מלאך יהוה, malak YHWH as also used in Haggai 1:13; of prophets in Isaiah 42:19; Malachi 3:6; of priests in Malachi 2:7, interpreted as "a messenger of the Lord". The Targum paraphrases it as "a prophet with a message from Jehovah", but in the Book of Judges this refers to an angel sent directly by God to be his mouthpiece because:
1. The phrase in this sense is used multiple times in this book (Judges 6:11-12; Judges 6:21-22; Judges 13:3; Judges 13:13; Judges 13:15, etc.).
2. The same phrase in this sense is also used elsewhere, as in Genesis 16:7; Genesis 22:11; Exodus 2:2; Exodus 2:6; Exodus 2:14; Numbers 22:22, etc.
3. The angel speaks in the first person, not using introductory words such as “Thus saith Jehovah,” as the prophets always do.

It is also possible that this “the angel of the Lord” is the same as “the captain of the Lord’s host,” who appeared to Joshua at Jericho (Joshua 5:13-15).

== Israel's pattern of disobedience (2:6–23) ==
This section laid out a theologically grounded view of history throughout this book: Israel's military and political fortunes depend not on pragmatic matters such as economic strength, political unity, or military preparedness, but rather on the people's faithfulness to the covenantal relationship with God, and appears also to depend on strong leaders, such as Joshua (verse 6–7). When Joshua and the generation of the Exodus died, a new generation replaced them, but they 'did not know YHWH or the work he had done for Israel' (verse 10) and this generally signaled trouble for Israel in other biblical texts (cf. Exodus 1:8; 1 Kings 12:8). Verses 11–23 outline the pattern of Israel's history under the judges as follows:

- apostasy
- punishment by military defeat and subjugation
- the people's distress
- the raising of a "judge", who inspires and delivers Israel
- the death of the judge
- relapse into apostasy
- defeat.

This framework is comparable to the theology and language in Deuteronomy 4:21–31; 6:10–15; 9:4–7; 12:29–32; 28:25, and unifies the Book of Judges as a whole (cf. the language and content at 3:7–10, 12, 15; 4:1; 6:1–10; 10:6–16; 13:1). When Israel 'abandons' YHWH (verses 12–13) to 'lust after' foreign gods (verse 17, especially the Canaanite Baal and his consort, Astharoth, then YHWH becomes 'angry' and 'incensed' with them (verses 12,14, 20). This passage ends with a twist on the topic of Israel's incomplete conquest in Canaan: God allowed enemies to remain in the land to test Israel's faithfulness.

=== Verse 9 ===
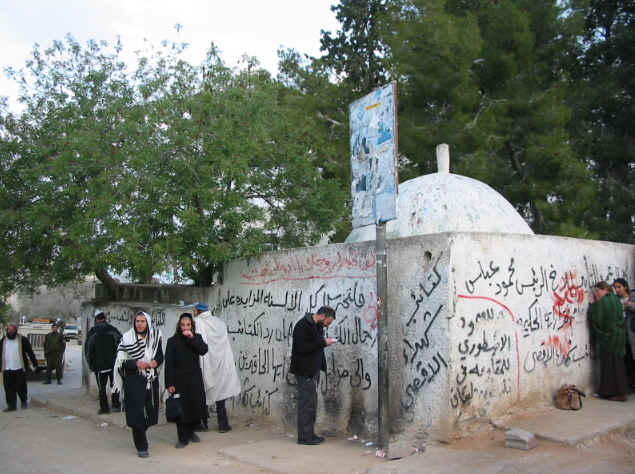
Tomb of Joshua in Kifl Hares ("Timnath-heres") according to a Samaritan tradition.

And they buried him in the border of his inheritance in Timnathheres, in the mount of Ephraim, on the north side of the hill Gaash.

- Cross reference: Joshua 24:30
- "Timnath-heres" meaning “the portion of the sun”, is written as "Timnath-serah" (“the portion that remains”) in Joshua 19:50. The sun may refers to the incident of “the sun standing still upon Gibeah,” and that according to Rabinnical tradition an image of the sun (temunath ha-kheres) was sculptured on his tomb. In the Talmud the place is mentioned in Bava Batra 122b, where "heres" is translated as "earthenware," in reference to fruits in the area being as dry as earthenware prior to the arrival of Joshua, whereas the inversion of the word, "serah", is defined as "rotting," that after Joshua's arrival, the fruits became so juicy that they could quickly rot. This location has variously been identified with the Palestinian village of Kifl Hares, located 6 kilometres west of Salfit, 18 kilometres (11 mi) south of Nablus, in the West Bank; or Khirbet Tibnah, located between Deir Nidham and Nabi Salih.

At the end of the parallel verse Joshua 24:30, the Septuagint has additional words, which may come from a Haggadah (traditional legend), that the flint knives used for the mass circumcision after crossing the Jordan River (Joshua 5:2) was buried in Joshua’s tomb.

== See also ==
- Angel of the Lord
- Ashtaroth
- Baal
- Baalim
- Bochim
- Children of Israel
- Egypt
- Gaash
- Gilgal
- Idolatry
- Joshua
- Mount Ephraim
- Nun (biblical figure)
- Timnath-heres
- Related Bible parts: Joshua 24, Judges 1

== Sources ==
- Coogan, Michael David (2007). Coogan, Michael David; Brettler, Marc Zvi; Newsom, Carol Ann; Perkins, Pheme (eds.). The New Oxford Annotated Bible with the Apocryphal/Deuterocanonical Books: New Revised Standard Version, Issue 48 (Augmented 3rd ed.). Oxford University Press. ISBN 978-0195288810.
- Finkelstein, Israel; Lederman, Zvi, eds. (1997). Highlands of many cultures. Tel Aviv: Institute of Archaeology of Tel Aviv University Publications Section. ISBN 965-440-007-3.
- Halley, Henry H. (1965). Halley's Bible Handbook: an abbreviated Bible commentary (24th (revised) ed.). Zondervan Publishing House. ISBN 0-310-25720-4.
- Hayes, Christine (2015). Introduction to the Bible. Yale University Press. ISBN 978-0300188271.
- Niditch, Susan (2007). "10. Judges". In Barton, John; Muddiman, John (eds.). The Oxford Bible Commentary (first (paperback) ed.). Oxford University Press. pp. 176–191. ISBN 978-0199277186.
- Schürer, E. (1891). Geschichte des jüdischen Volkes im Zeitalter Jesu Christi [A History of the Jewish People in the Time of Jesus Christ]. Geschichte de jüdischen Volkes im Zeitalter Jesu Christi.English. Vol. 1. Translated by Miss Taylor. New York: Charles Scribner's Sons.
- Würthwein, Ernst (1995). The Text of the Old Testament. Translated by Rhodes, Erroll F. Grand Rapids, MI: Wm. B. Eerdmans. ISBN 0-8028-0788-7.
