= Anab al-Kabir =

Anab al-Kabir Arabic: عناب الكبير
- Anab al-Kabir
- Location of Anab al-Kabir within Palestine
- Coordinates: 31°23′40″N 34°55′35″E
- Palestine grid: 143/89
- Country: Palestine
- Governorate: Hebron Governorate
- Elevation: 586 m (1,923 ft)

Population (2007)
  - Total: 335

Anab al-Kabir is a Palestinian village in the Hebron Governorate, located 22 km southwest of the city of Hebron in the southern West Bank.

== Geography ==
Its elevation is approximately 586 meters above sea level. It is bordered to the east by Khirbet Umm al-Qasab, to the north by the town of Ad-Dhahiriya, to the west by al-Ramadin, and to the south by the village of Sumera.

== History ==
Ceramics from the Byzantine era have been found here.

=== Ottoman era ===
Anab al-Kabir, like the rest of Palestine, was incorporated into the Ottoman Empire in 1516, and in a tax register from 1596, the village was listed as part of the nahiya (sudistrict) of Hebron in the Liwa of Jerusalem. It appeared under the name Anan al-Kubra with a population of 55 households and 5 bachelors, all Muslim, a total of 60 taxable units. The villagers paid a fixed tax rate of 33.3% on various agricultural products, such as wheat (5000 a.), barley (2800 a.), summer crops (800 a.), goats and/or beehives (200 a.), in addition to occasional revenues (100 a.); a total of 9,000 akçe. Part of the revenue went to a waqf.

In 1863 Victor Guérin noted:

"The city whose ruins this khirbet offers was situated on two hills, one to the west and the other to the east, separated by a valley that is now used for agriculture and which seems to have also been covered with dwellings in the past. While traversing the site that this city occupied, one encounters at every step the remains of houses completely overturned, most of which contained a hypogeum carved into the rock. There are numerous cisterns; some are blocked by debris, while others are still full of water.

On the western hill, one notices a mosque that measures fourteen paces long by ten wide, and which has been almost entirely built with antique blocks, some of which are carved in relief. Vaulted inside, it is crowned externally by a flat terrace. Three star-shaped crosses decorate the lintel of the door, which could suggest that this Muslim sanctuary succeeded a Christian building.
On the eastern hill, the traces of a Christian church are still very recognizable, although it has been three-quarters destroyed; only a few remnants of walls and part of the central apse remain. This church had been built with magnificent blocks of the finest stonework. The main nave was adorned with columns; only one remains in place.

On this very hill, we also observe the considerable remains of a large building that seems to have had a military purpose; it was constructed of very regularly arranged stone blocks. About forty grain mills lie here and there."

In 1883, the PEF's Survey of Western Palestine described the ruins at 'Anab: "An extensive ruin on a flat ridge. Caves, rock-cut cisterns, and wine-presses; heaps of stones, most of them drafted, and fallen pillars were found. There are ruins of a church, which seems earlier than Crusading times. The true bearing is 110°. The south wall (exclusive of the apse projection) measures 57 feet 6 inches outside. The west wall measures 48 feet; two pillar bases remain in place, giving three bays in length for the church. The apse is 11 feet 7 inches radius inside. The church had a door on the west. Two courses of the south wall are standing above the surface. The stones are from 1 foot 10 inches to 3 feet 8 inches long, and 1 foot 10 inches high; traces of drafting are visible on several. The stones in the apse are 4 to 5 feet long. One pillar is still standing, 8 feet 9 inches high, and 1 foot 5 inches diameter."

== Population ==
The village's population, according to the 2007 Palestinian census, was 335.

== Bibliography ==
- Conder, C.R.; Kitchener, H.H. (1883). The Survey of Western Palestine: Memoirs of the Topography, Orography, Hydrography, and Archaeology. Vol. 3. London: Committee of the Palestine Exploration Fund.
- Dauphin, C. (1998). La Palestine Byzantine, Peuplement et Populations. BAR International Series 726 (in French). Vol. III : Catalogue. Oxford: Archeopress. ISBN 0-860549-05-4.
- Hütteroth, W.-D.; Abdulfattah, K. (1977). Historical Geography of Palestine, Transjordan and Southern Syria in the Late 16th Century. Erlanger Geographische Arbeiten, Sonderband 5. Erlangen, Germany: Vorstand der Fränkischen Geographischen Gesellschaft. ISBN 3-920405-41-2.
- Guérin, V. (1869). Description Géographique Historique et Archéologique de la Palestine (in French). Vol. 1: Judee, pt. 3. Paris: L'Imprimerie Nationale.
- Palmer, E.H. (1881). The Survey of Western Palestine: Arabic and English Name Lists Collected During the Survey by Lieutenants Conder and Kitchener, R. E. Transliterated and Explained by E.H. Palmer. Committee of the Palestine Exploration Fund.
