= Joshua 11 =

Book of Joshua, chapter 11

- ← chapter 10 chapter 12 →
- The pages containing the Book of Joshua in Leningrad Codex (1008 CE).
- Book: Book of Joshua
- Hebrew Bible part: Nevi'im
- Order in the Hebrew part: 1
- Category: Former Prophets
- Christian Bible part: Old Testament
- Order in the Christian part: 6

Joshua 11 is the eleventh chapter of the Book of Joshua in the Hebrew Bible or in the Old Testament of the Christian Bible. According to Jewish tradition the book was attributed to Joshua, with additions by the high priests Eleazar and Phinehas, but modern scholars view it as part of the Deuteronomistic History, which spans the books of Deuteronomy to 2 Kings, attributed to nationalistic and devotedly Yahwistic writers during the time of the reformer Judean king Josiah in 7th century BCE. This chapter focuses on the conquest of the land of Canaan by the Israelites under the leadership of Joshua, a part of a section comprising Joshua 5:13–12:24 about the conquest of Canaan.

== Text ==
This chapter was originally written in the Hebrew language. It is divided into 23 verses.

=== Textual witnesses ===
Some early manuscripts containing the text of this chapter in Hebrew are of the Masoretic Text tradition, which includes the Codex Cairensis (895), Aleppo Codex (10th century), and Codex Leningradensis (1008).

Extant ancient manuscripts of a translation into Koine Greek known as the Septuagint (originally was made in the last few centuries BCE) include Codex Vaticanus (B; $\mathfrak{G}$^{B}; 4th century) and Codex Alexandrinus (A; $\mathfrak{G}$^{A}; 5th century). (Note: The whole book of Joshua is missing from the extant Codex Sinaiticus.)

== Analysis ==
The narrative of the Israelites conquering the land of Canaan comprises verses 5:13 to 12:24 of the Book of Joshua and has the following outline:

A. Jericho (5:13–6:27)
B. Achan and Ai (7:1–8:29)
C. Renewal at Mount Ebal (8:30–35)
D. The Gibeonite Deception (9:1–27)
E. The Campaign in the South (10:1–43)
F. The Campaign in the North and Summary List of Kings (11:1–12:24)

1. Victory over the Northern Alliance (11:1-15)

a. The Northern Alliance (11:1-5)
b. Divine Reassurance (11:6)
c. Victory at Merom (11:7-9)
d. Destruction of Hazor (11:10–11)
e. Summation of Obedience and Victory (11:12–15)

2. Summaries of Taking the Land (11:16-12:24)

a. Taking the Land (11:16-20)
b. Extermination of the Anakim (11:21-22)
c. Narrative Pivot: Taking and Allotting (11:23)
d. Capture of Land and Kings (12:1-24)

i. East of the Jordan (12:1-6)
ii. West of the Jordan (12:7-24)

== Victory over the Northern Alliance (11:1–15) ==
The narrative of the northern conquest begins with the familiar formula,'when x heard'—here Jabin, king of Hazor, who then formed an alliance with kings around the area to prepare for the battle against the Israelites. No specific military or strategic plan is detailed of a march north by Joshua and Israel, except for an image of a surprise attack to the alliance camp at Merom (verse 7). The fulfilment of YHWH's command (to Moses, then from Moses to Joshua) is the most important element in the narrative of Joshua's success (verses 6, 9, 15), which also includes the hamstringing of the Canaanites' horses and the burning of their chariots (verse 9). The following conquest extends to the Mediterranean far to the north at Sidon (as far as 'Lebanon and... to the Western Sea' in Deuteronomy), then turning south-eastwards over Lake Huleh (now a fertile plain) towards Hazor, which is burned after the execution of the herem ("ban"; verses 10–15), whereas other cities are also destroyed, but not burned.

=== Verses 1–3 ===
^{1}And it came to pass, when Jabin king of Hazor heard these things, that he sent to Jobab king of Madon, to the king of Shimron, to the king of Achshaph, ^{2}and to the kings who were from the north, in the mountains, in the plain south of Chinneroth, in the lowland, and in the heights of Dor on the west, ^{3}to the Canaanites in the east and in the west, the Amorite, the Hittite, the Perizzite, the Jebusite in the mountains, and the Hivite below Hermon in the land of Mizpah.

- "Jabin": this name is associated with a later defeat of the same city of Hazor in Judges 4–5, which may indicate a dynastic appellation.
- "Hazor" was the largest city in Joshua's time of conquest, with as many as 40,000 inhabitants (estimated from excavations), perhaps ten times larger than Jerusalem, based on the information from extra-biblical ancient documents such as the Amarna letters. Archaeology explorations reveal that this city was burnt in the thirteenth century BCE —as recorded in Judges 4–5, implying some revival in city's fortunes in the period after Joshua— not to be rebuilt as a fortified city again until the time of Solomon (1 Kings 9:15).

== Summaries of taking the land (11:16–23) ==
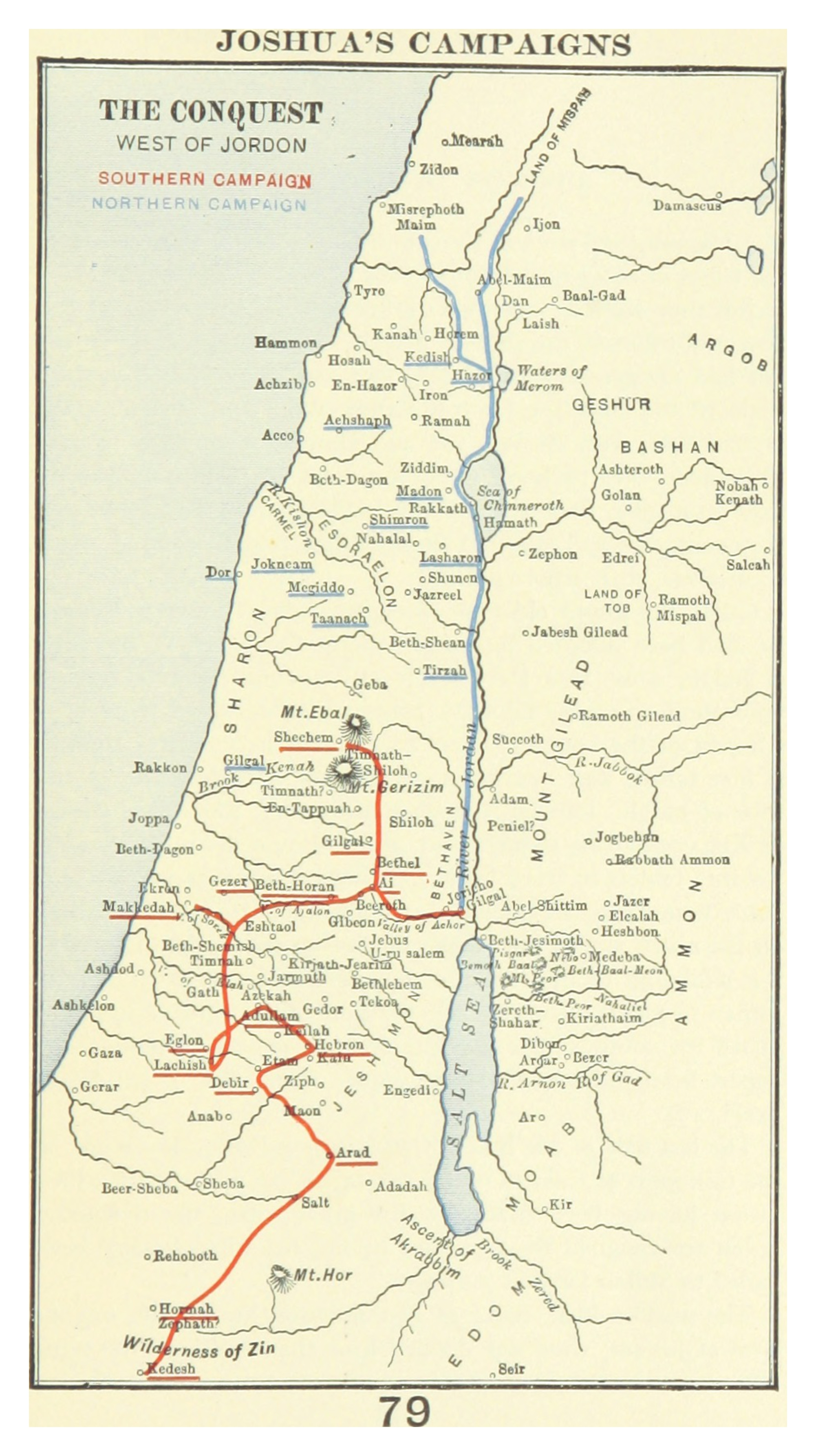
Map of Joshua's conquest in Canaan; the blue line follows the battles in the northern regions. 1899. British Library HMNTS 010077.f.24.

Verses 16–20 summarize the area of the land now under Israel's control, from south to north — Mount Halak on the borderland of Edom (Seir) in the far south-east; Baal-gad near Mt. Hermon in the far north. The victory over the kings of the land is emphasized by a repetition (verses 17–18), with the exception of Gibeon (a blemish on the record), underlined by the rationale: God 'hardened their hearts' against Israel (cf. Pharaoh against Moses in Exodus 7:13; see Joshua 10:20), so that they might be utterly destroyed (referring to herem or the "ban"). The Anakim (verses 21–23) had inspired fear in Israel, when the spies first surveyed the land (Numbers 13:28; Deuteronomy 1:28), but the report of the victory here removed the misplaced fear, and witnesses the promise fulfillment of Deuteronomy 9:1–3. The phrase 'the land had rest from war' recalls Deuteronomy 12:10, which anticipates the life of Israel in the land after all wars are won and the land is divided among all tribes.

=== Verse 23 ===
So Joshua took the whole land, according to all that the Lord said unto Moses; and Joshua gave it for an inheritance unto Israel according to their divisions by their tribes. And the land rested from war.

This verse summarizes the activities recorded in the book thus far. The note that the land was divided for the tribes of Israel and that the land rested were past events for the narrator, but are still future in the narrative.

- "The whole land" refers to 'the territory west of the Jordan River' that was conquered under Joshua's leadership, because the area east of Jordan was taken under the leadership of Moses.

== See also ==
- Achshaph
- Ai
- Amorites
- Anab
- Anakim
- Ashdod
- Baal-gad
- Beth-horon
- Canaanite
- Children of Israel
- Chinneroth
- Debir (city)
- Dor
- Gath
- Gaza
- Gilgal
- Hebron
- Hittites
- Hivites
- Israelites
- Jabin king of Hazor
- Jobab king of Madon
- Jebusite
- Jericho
- Jordan River
- Lebanon
- Misrephoth-maim
- Mizpeh
- Moses
- Mount Hermon
- Seir
- Negev Goshen
- Perizzites
- Shimron
- Sidon
- Waters of Merom
- Related Bible parts: Joshua 6, Joshua 8, Joshua 10, Joshua 12

== Sources ==
- Beal, Lissa M. Wray (2019). Longman, Tremper III; McKnight, Scot (eds.). Joshua. The Story of God Bible Commentary. Zondervan Academic. ISBN 978-0310490838.
- Coogan, Michael David (2007). Coogan, Michael David; Brettler, Marc Zvi; Newsom, Carol Ann; Perkins, Pheme (eds.). The New Oxford Annotated Bible with the Apocryphal/Deuterocanonical Books: New Revised Standard Version, Issue 48 (Augmented 3rd ed.). Oxford University Press. ISBN 978-0195288810.
- Firth, David G. (2021). Joshua: Evangelical Biblical Theology Commentary. Evangelical Biblical Theology Commentary (EBTC) (illustrated ed.). Lexham Press. ISBN 9781683594406.
- Halley, Henry H. (1965). Halley's Bible Handbook: an abbreviated Bible commentary (24th (revised) ed.). Zondervan Publishing House. ISBN 0-310-25720-4.
- Harstad, Adolph L. (2004). Joshua. Concordia Publishing House. ISBN 978-0570063193.
- Hayes, Christine (2015). Introduction to the Bible. Yale University Press. ISBN 978-0300188271.
- Hubbard, Robert L (2009). Joshua. The NIV Application Commentary. Zondervan. ISBN 978-0310209348.
- McConville, Gordon (2007). "9. Joshua". In Barton, John; Muddiman, John (eds.). The Oxford Bible Commentary (first (paperback) ed.). Oxford University Press. pp. 158–176. ISBN 978-0199277186.
- Rösel, Hartmut N. (2011). Joshua. Historical commentary on the Old Testament. Vol. 6 (illustrated ed.). Peeters. ISBN 978-9042925922.
- Würthwein, Ernst (1995). The Text of the Old Testament. Translated by Rhodes, Erroll F. Grand Rapids, MI: Wm. B. Eerdmans. ISBN 0-8028-0788-7.
