= Joshua 10 =

Book of Joshua, chapter 10

- ← chapter 9 chapter 11 →
- The pages containing the Book of Joshua in Leningrad Codex (1008 CE).
- Book: Book of Joshua
- Hebrew Bible part: Nevi'im
- Order in the Hebrew part: 1
- Category: Former Prophets
- Christian Bible part: Old Testament
- Order in the Christian part: 6

Joshua 10 is the tenth chapter of the Book of Joshua in the Hebrew Bible or in the Old Testament of the Christian Bible. According to Jewish tradition the book was attributed to Joshua, with additions by the high priests Eleazar and Phinehas, but modern scholars view it as part of the Deuteronomistic History, which spans the books of Deuteronomy to 2 Kings, attributed to nationalistic and devotedly Yahwistic writers during the time of the reformer Judean king Josiah in 7th century BCE. This chapter focuses on the conquest of southern part of Canaan by the Israelites under the leadership of Joshua, a part of a section comprising Joshua 5:13–12:24 about the conquest of Canaan.

== Text ==
This chapter was originally written in the Hebrew language. It is divided into 43 verses.

=== Textual witnesses ===
Some early manuscripts containing the text of this chapter in Hebrew are of the Masoretic Text tradition, which includes the Codex Cairensis (895), Aleppo Codex (10th century), and Codex Leningradensis (1008). Fragments containing parts of this chapter in Hebrew were found among the Dead Sea Scrolls including 4Q47 (4QJosh^{a}; 200–100 BCE) with extant verses 2–5, 8–11.

Extant ancient manuscripts of a translation into Koine Greek known as the Septuagint (originally was made in the last few centuries BCE) include Codex Vaticanus (B; $\mathfrak{G}$^{B}; 4th century) and Codex Alexandrinus (A; $\mathfrak{G}$^{A}; 5th century). (Note: The whole book of Joshua is missing from the extant Codex Sinaiticus.) Fragments of the Septuagint Greek text containing this chapter are found in manuscripts such as Washington Manuscript I (5th century CE), and a reduced version of the Septuagint text is found in the illustrated Joshua Roll.

== Analysis ==
The narrative of the Israelites conquering the land of Canaan comprises verses 5:13 to 12:24 of the Book of Joshua and has the following outline:

A. Jericho (5:13–6:27)
B. Achan and Ai (7:1–8:29)
C. Renewal at Mount Ebal (8:30–35)
D. The Gibeonite Deception (9:1–27)
E. The Campaign in the South (10:1–43)

1. Victory over the Southern Alliance (10:1-15)

a. The Southern Alliance (10:1-5)
b. The Gibeonite Request (10:6-7)
c. Divine Reassurance (10:8)
d. Victory at Gibeon (10:9-11)
e. Affirmation of God's Unique Involvement (10:12-15)

2. Execution of the Five Kings of the Southern Alliance (10:16-27)

a. The Kings Held in the Cave (10:16-21)
b. The Kings Brought Out from the Cave (10:22-25)
c. The Kings Executed (10:26-27)

3. Victory over Southern Cities (10:28-39)

a. Makkedah (10:28)
b. Libnah (10:29-30)
c. Lachish (10:31-33)
d. Eglon (10:34-35)
e. Hebron (10:36-37)
f. Debir (10:38-39)

4. Summary of the Campaign in the South (10:40-43)

F. The Campaign in the North and Summary List of Kings (11:1–12:24)

1. Victory over the Northern Alliance (11:1-15)

a. The Northern Alliance (11:1-5)
b. Divine Reassurance (11:6)
c. Victory at Merom (11:7-9)
d. Destruction of Hazor (11:10–11)
e. Summation of Obedience and Victory (11:12–15)

2. Summaries of Taking the Land (11:16-12:24)

a. Taking the Land (11:16-20)
b. Extermination of the Anakim (11:21-22)
c. Narrative Pivot: Taking and Allotting (11:23)
d. Capture of Land and Kings (12:1-24)

i. East of the Jordan (12:1-6)
ii. West of the Jordan (12:7-24)

Chapters 10 and 11 closely parallel each other and have similar structure:

Joshua 10	Joshua 11
southern alliance (10:1–5)	northern alliance (11:1–5)
divine reassurance (10:8)	divine reassurance (11:6)
victory employing surprise (10:9–11)	victory employing surprise (11:7–9)
execution of kings/destruction of cities (10:16–39)	execution of kings/destruction of cities (11:10–15)
conquest summary (10:40–43)	conquest summary (11:16–23)

== Victory over the Southern Alliance (10:1–27) ==
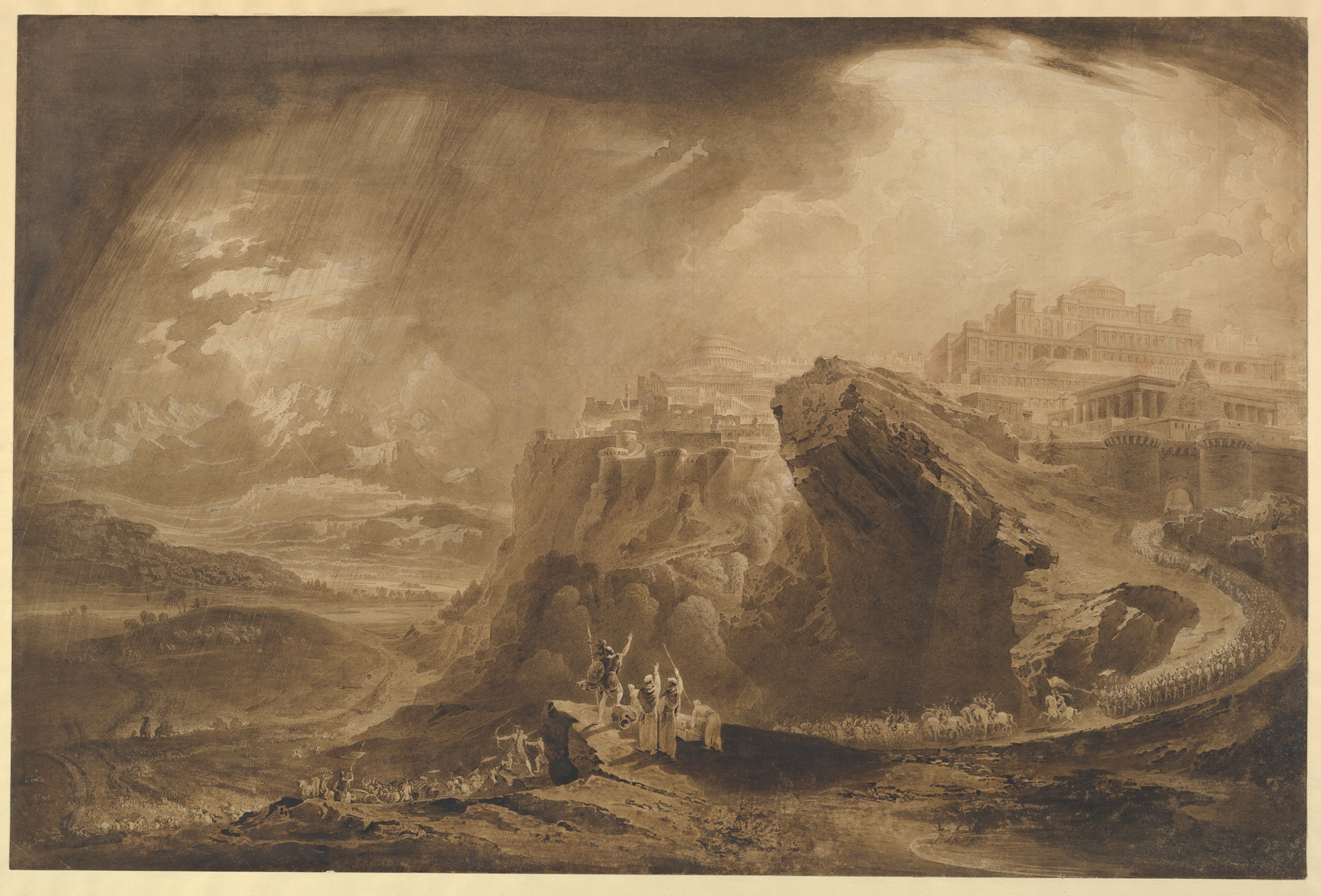
"Joshua Commanding the Sun to Stand Still Upon Gibeon" (Joshua 10:12–14) by John Martin (c. 1822)

Gibeon was apparently a relatively powerful city-state, 'like one of the royal cities' (verse 2), although it did not have a king (none is mentioned in Joshua 9), so its submission to the Israelites without war shocked the region (verses 1–15) and the neighboring states declared war to Gibeon for the perceived betrayal. Having an alliance with Israel, the Gibeonites can requested help from the Israelites (verse 6). This opportunity enabled Joshua at the same time to fight for control of the whole southern region of Canaan. Jerusalem occupies an important location on the central ridge, between south and north mountains, and its king, Adoni-zedek, established an alliance with four other kings from across the southern highlands (cf 12:10–13; later would become the territory of Judah). The battle report against the southern alliance emphasizes the hand of God in the victory, as the hailstones from heaven were more devastating than the action of Israelite forces, and the staying of the sun and moon (meaning that 'the day was lengthened') demonstrated that YHWH, not Joshua, had the full control of even the heavenly bodies in the defeat of the southern kings.

In the battle Israel pursued the fleeing enemies into their territory, 'as far as Azekah and Makkedah' (verse 10), then they cornered the five kings into a cave and held them there until their armies were thoroughly decimated with only a few survivors going back to their cities (verses 16–27). The five kings were executed by hanging (verse 24), similar to the treatment of the king of Ai (Joshua 8:29). Memorial stones were again established to mark the victory accompanied by Joshua's words of encouragement to the army (verse 25) recalling God's words to Joshua at the start of the conquest (Joshua 1:6).

=== Verse 5 ===
Therefore the five kings of the Amorites, the king of Jerusalem, the king of Hebron, the king of Jarmuth, the king of Lachish, the king of Eglon, gathered themselves together, and went up, they and all their hosts, and encamped before Gibeon, and made war against it.

- "Lachish": was already a major city-state in Joshua's time (made famous by the reliefs of Sennacherib's siege, now in the British Museum). Azekah lies on the route from Jerusalem to Lachish.
- "Hebron": south-east of Lachish, was known to the patriarchs as Kiriath-arba.

== Victory over Southern Cities (10:28–43) ==
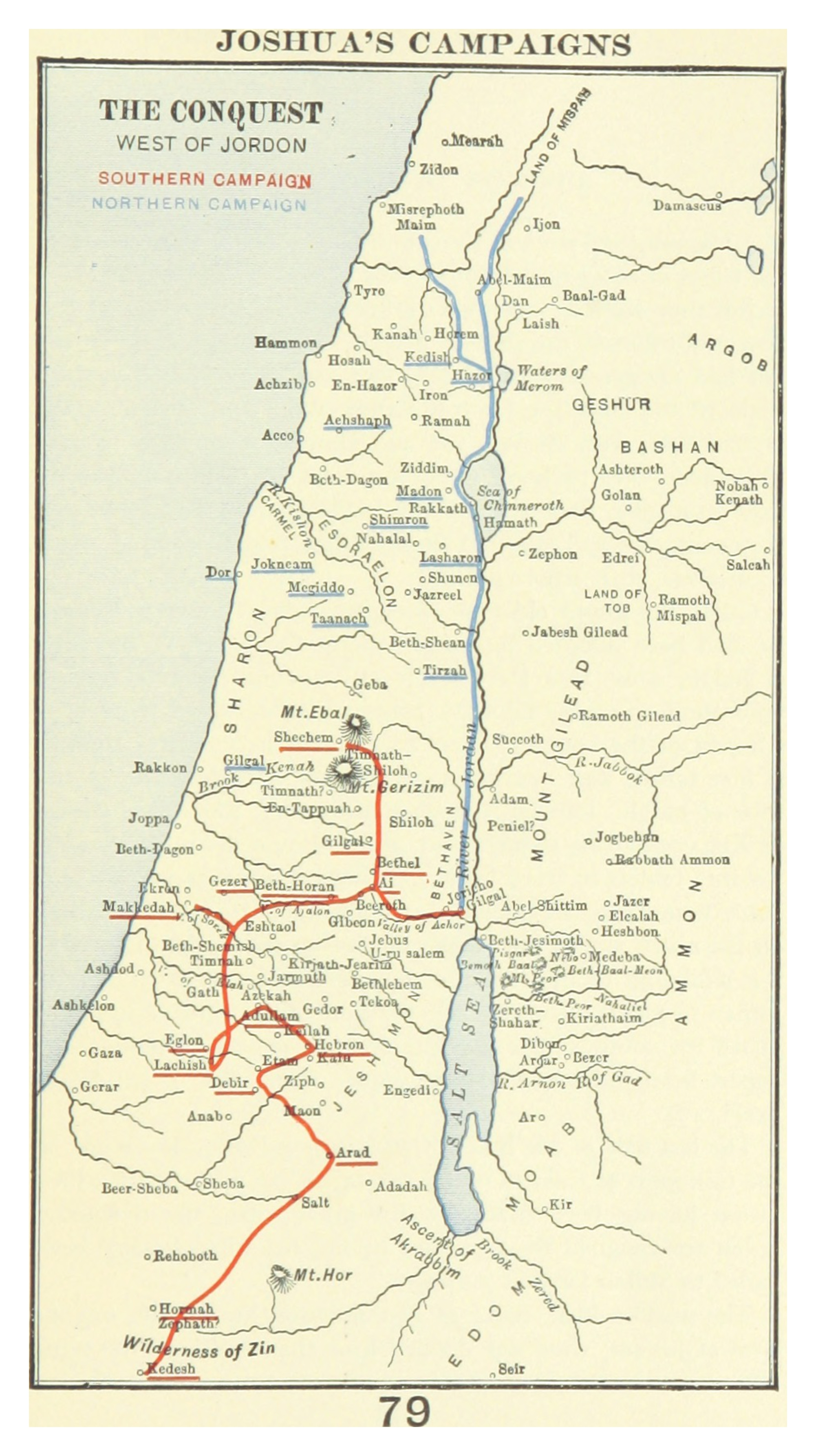
Map of Joshua's conquest of Canaan. Red lines follow the battles in the southern regions. 1899. British Library HMNTS 010077.f.24.

The next phase in the campaign is the conquest of the cities from which the alliance had come, now defended only by few survivals from the battlefield, but the conquered cities do not correspond exactly to those forming the alliance.

Younger shows that the conquest of southern cities (verses 28-39) has a specific chiasm structure: A Makkedah (verse 28) B Libnah (verses 29–30) C Lachish (verses 31–32) X Gezer (verse 33) C' Eglon (verses 34–35) B' Hebron (verses 36–37) A' Debir (verses 38–39) The center of a chiasm (the member with no parallel) is the report of Israel's attack of King Horam of Gezer who had marched his army in defense of Lachish (verse 33), but Israel never conquered Gezer (16:10), so the chiasm emphasizes the event as memorable in relation to the city's ancient importance.

The conquest report of those cities follows a repeating formula (but not in lock-step order):

1. The city's capture (verses. 28, 32, 35, 37, 39)
2. The siege and attack (verses 29, 31, 34, 36, 38)
3. The city, everyone put to the sword (verses 28, 30, 32, 35, 37, 39)
4. No survivors remain (verses 28, 30, 33, 35, 37, 39)
5. Israel implements the "ban" (verses. 28, 35, 37, 39)
6. The king suffers the same fate as the king of city-X (verses 28, 30, 32, 35, 37, 39)

The statement 6 for both Makkedah (city 1) and Libnah (city 2) is compared to that of Jericho, whereas that of the next three is compared only to the one destroyed just before it. The fate of the final city, Debir (verses 38-39) is compared to both Libnah (city 2) and Hebron (city 5).

Jerusalem, as also stated in the Book of Judges, was not subjugated by Joshua (Joshua 15:63), whereas the conquest on Jarmuth is not recorded. Gezer was mentioned but not conquered (it is finally taken at the time of Solomon; 1 Kings 9:16; cf. Joshua 16:10). Libnah and Debir, not parts of the alliance, were taken due to geographical proximities to other conquered cities (to fulfill the herem, or ban; verses 28, 35, 37, 40).

The narrative ends with a summary statement that Joshua controlled the entire southern part of the land. Based on the estimate of logistics involved, the conquests in this chapter could take several weeks (or even months) to complete.

=== Verse 41 ===
And Joshua struck them from Kadesh-barnea as far as Gaza, and all the country of Goshen, as far as Gibeon.

- "Kadesh-barnea" was the starting point of the first attempt of conquest (Deuteronomy 1:2; 2:14).
- "Gaza" is located in the coastal area; no specific report of victories there.
- "Goshen": is probably an area in the southern reaches of the Negeb (not the Goshen of Joseph's Egypt; Genesis 45:10).

== See also ==
- Adonizedek king of Jerusalem
- Ai
- Ajalon
- Amorites
- Azekah
- Beth-horon
- Book of Jasher (Sefer haYashar)
- Canaanite
- Children of Israel
- Debir (city)
- Debir king of Eglon
- Gaza
- Gilgal
- Hoham king of Hebron
- Horam king of Gezer
- Israelites
- Japhia king of Lachish
- Jebusite
- Jericho
- Jordan River
- Kadesh-barnea
- Libnah
- Makkedah
- Moses
- Negev
- Non-canonical books referenced in the Bible
- Piram king of Jarmuth
- Related Bible parts: Deuteronomy 1, Joshua 6, Joshua 8, Joshua 11

== Sources ==
- Beal, Lissa M. Wray (2019). Longman, Tremper III; McKnight, Scot (eds.). Joshua. The Story of God Bible Commentary. Zondervan Academic. ISBN 978-0310490838.
- Coogan, Michael David (2007). Coogan, Michael David; Brettler, Marc Zvi; Newsom, Carol Ann; Perkins, Pheme (eds.). The New Oxford Annotated Bible with the Apocryphal/Deuterocanonical Books: New Revised Standard Version, Issue 48 (Augmented 3rd ed.). Oxford University Press. ISBN 978-0195288810.
- Firth, David G. (2021). Joshua: Evangelical Biblical Theology Commentary. Evangelical Biblical Theology Commentary (EBTC) (illustrated ed.). Lexham Press. ISBN 9781683594406.
- Fitzmyer, Joseph A. (2008). A Guide to the Dead Sea Scrolls and Related Literature. Grand Rapids, MI: William B. Eerdmans Publishing Company. ISBN 9780802862419.
- Halley, Henry H. (1965). Halley's Bible Handbook: an abbreviated Bible commentary (24th (revised) ed.). Zondervan Publishing House. ISBN 0-310-25720-4.
- Harstad, Adolph L. (2004). Joshua. Concordia Publishing House. ISBN 978-0570063193.
- Hayes, Christine (2015). Introduction to the Bible. Yale University Press. ISBN 978-0300188271.
- Hubbard, Robert L (2009). Joshua. The NIV Application Commentary. Zondervan. ISBN 978-0310209348.
- McConville, Gordon (2007). "9. Joshua". In Barton, John; Muddiman, John (eds.). The Oxford Bible Commentary (first (paperback) ed.). Oxford University Press. pp. 158–176. ISBN 978-0199277186.
- Rösel, Hartmut N. (2011). Joshua. Historical commentary on the Old Testament. Vol. 6 (illustrated ed.). Peeters. ISBN 978-9042925922.
- Ulrich, Eugene, ed. (2010). The Biblical Qumran Scrolls: Transcriptions and Textual Variants. Brill.
- Würthwein, Ernst (1995). The Text of the Old Testament. Translated by Rhodes, Erroll F. Grand Rapids, MI: Wm. B. Eerdmans. ISBN 0-8028-0788-7.
