= Baal-gad =

Baal-Gad was a Canaanite town at the foot of Mount Hermon. It is mentioned in the Bible three times, all of them in the Book of Joshua (Josh. 11:17; 12:7; 13:5). In all cases, it is described as the northernmost point of Joshua's conquests. The name may relate to Gad, a Semitic deity of fortune, but more likely simply refers to Baal with the epithet “of fortune”.

== Identification ==
The exact location of Baal-gad is uncertain, but it is generally accepted as being in the vicinity of Wadi al-Taym in southeastern Lebanon. The earliest suggestions identified it with Banias or Baalbek, while Félix-Marie Abel suggested identifying it with Hasbaya. However, archeological evidence suggests that neither Banias nor Hasbaya were inhabited before the Hellenistic period, while Baalbek is too far north to fit with the geographical details in Joshua. Simons proposes identifying Baal-Gad with the site of Tell Haush/Tell ez-Zeitun, a small tell in Beqaa Governorate just north of Haouch El-Qenaabeh (حوش القنعبة, about 8.5 kilometers southwest of Rashaya and 12 kilometers north of Hasbaya). Jericke accepts this identification, as Tell Haush/Tell ez-Zeitun is the only site with Late Bronze Age and Iron Age Levantine remains between Iyyon near Marjayoun to the south and Kamid el-Loz to the north.
