= Ahlab =

Town in the Hebrew Bible

Ahlab (- fatness), a town of Asher lying within the unconquered Phoenician border (Judg. 1:31); commonly identified with Hirbet al-Mahalib, north to Tyre.
