= COVID-19 pandemic in Palestine =

Aspect of viral disease pandemic

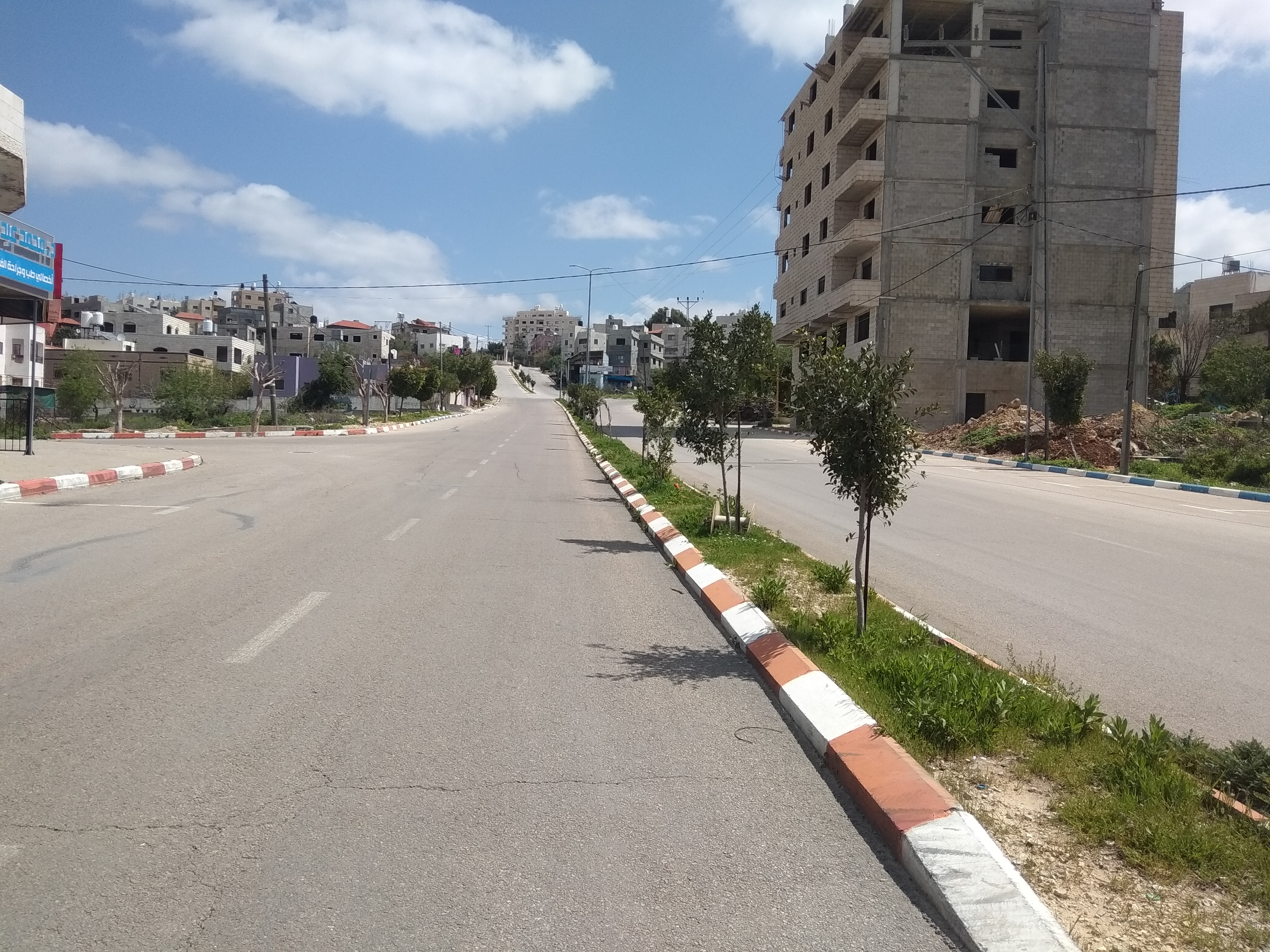
- Empty streets in Salfit in March 2020
- Disease: COVID-19
- Pathogen: SARS-CoV-2
- Location: Palestine
- First outbreak: Wuhan, Hubei, China
- Index case: Bethlehem
- Arrival date: 5 March 2020 (Duration: 6 years, 7 months, 3 weeks and 3 days)
- Confirmed cases: 703,228
- Deaths: 5,708
- Vaccinations: 2,012,767 (total vaccinated); 1,776,973 (fully vaccinated); 3,748,571 (doses administered)

Government website
- Official website (Note: The unofficial site, corona.ps has been used since inception and this will continue provided that there is no significant divergence in the reported data)

The COVID-19 pandemic in Palestine is part of the worldwide pandemic of coronavirus disease 2019 (COVID-19) caused by severe acute respiratory syndrome coronavirus 2 (SARS-CoV-2). Palestine identified its first cases in the Bethlehem area on 5 March 2020, when a group of Greek tourists who visited a hotel in late February tested positive for the disease. The Hebron district was considered an epicenter of the outbreak. The first two cases in Gaza City, Gaza were diagnosed on 21 March. On 24 August 2020, confirmed cases outside of quarantine centers were recorded.

The senior United Nations official in the region told the United Nations Security Council in a 23 April 2020 video conference meeting that Israelis and Palestinians are cooperating in unprecedented ways to deal with the pandemic but that Israel must do more to safeguard the health of all people under its control.

According to an analysis by Haaretz on 22 July 2020, there is a concern that a combination of events may cause the situation to spin out of control. Following the severing of security coordination and civilian ties with Israel, the Palestinian Authority stopped coordinating on the treatment of patients with Israel and accepting mail and packages through Israeli ports and severed coordination with the Israeli Defense Forces (IDF) as well as the Shin Bet. Supervision of border crossings with Israel also stopped. On top of this, the dispute with Israel over tax revenues had a serious economic impact.

On 31 August 2020, according to United Nations Humanitarian Coordinator Jamie McGoldrick, "The deterioration witnessed in recent weeks in the Gaza Strip is of grave concern." He said "Power cuts are severely affecting hospitals as well as critical infrastructure" and called on Israel "to immediately allow the resumption of fuel into the Gaza Strip, in line with its obligations as an occupying power." The vaccination rollout began on 21 March 2021.

== Background ==
On 12 January 2020, the World Health Organization (WHO) confirmed that a novel coronavirus was the cause of a respiratory illness in a cluster of people in Wuhan City, Hubei Province, China, which was reported to the WHO on 31 December 2019. The case fatality ratio for COVID-19 has been much lower than SARS of 2003, but the transmission has been significantly greater, with a significant total death toll.

== Vaccines ==
=== Dispute over responsibility ===
==== International position ====
According to Professor of International Law Eyal Benvenisti, "Under international law and under Israeli public law, as interpreted by the Israeli Supreme Court, the Israeli government has a duty to ensure that the population in the territories is vaccinated." This is the position taken by Amnesty International, Human Rights Watch, and other Israeli, Palestinian and international human rights organisations. The United Nations (UN) human rights body says that "differential access is "morally and legally" unacceptable under international law laid out in the Geneva Conventions on the regulation of occupied territories." UN experts say international law takes priority over the Oslo accords and that "the fourth Geneva Convention is specific about the duty of the occupying power to provide healthcare" but that Israel often argues it is not an occupying power. Several US senators called on the US government to take some action to force Israel to provide such vaccines.

==== Israeli position ====
Under the Oslo Accords, annexe III, article 17, responsibility for vaccines in Gaza and the West bank is explicitly given to the Palestinian Authority (Note: the relevant articler reads " The Palestinian side shall continue to apply the present standards of vaccination of Palestinians and shall improve them according to internationally accepted standards in the field, taking into account WHO recommendations. In this regard, the Palestinian side shall continue the vaccination of the population with the vaccines listed in Schedule 3.") (Note: Palestinians point to a different part of the accords that says: "Israel and the Palestinian side shall exchange information regarding epidemics and contagious diseases, shall co-operate in combating them and shall develop methods for [the] exchange of medical files and documents.") Accordingly, Israel's official position is that it is under no legal obligation to provide vaccines to the Palestinian population in those territories. Alan Baker, the director of the International Law Program at the Jerusalem Center for Public Affairs and one of the drafters of the Oslo accords, has stated that while he believes Israel has "a moral and epidemiological obligation" to provide them, and a self-interest in doing so, there is no legal obligation.

=== Vaccination rollout ===
Hamas and the Palestinian Authority have signed up to the WHO and UN backed GAVI program, aimed at the most vulnerable 20 per cent of populations. "We expect something to become available by the end of the first quarter [of 2021], but it's really difficult to predict," said Gerald Rockenschaub, head of the WHO office for the occupied Palestinian territory. Palestinian leaders say they can't afford either of the Pfizer-BioNTech or Moderna vaccines. Russia is reported to have offered 4 million doses of its Sputnik V vaccine but details are unknown. On 9 January 2021, Mai Alkaila said that there was no set date for arrival of vaccines, that four vaccine producers companies have been contacted and that 70 per cent of the population would be covered while the World Health Organization would cover 20 per cent. Amnesty has demanded that Israel provide vaccines to Palestinians living in the West Bank but the Palestinian Authority has not asked for Israel assistance. Israeli Health Minister Yuli Edelstein has said that its own citizens must come first and in response to an appeal by Physicians for Human Rights that "Israel bears moral and humanitarian responsibility for vaccinating the Palestinian population under its control," denied any responsibility. On 10 January 2021, Mai Alkaila said that the Palestinian Authority has authorised the Sputnik V vaccine. The Russian Direct Investment Fund said deliveries to Palestinians would start in February. Health officials say they expect to receive two million doses of the Oxford-AstraZeneca vaccine in March. According to Hussein al-Sheikh, the top Palestinian official in charge of coordinating with Israel, the Palestinian Authority asked Israel for up to 10,000 doses of vaccine for frontline medical workers. Mai Alkaila said that health workers would be first to receive any vaccine. On 1 February 2021, it was confirmed that Israel has authorised the transfer of 5000 doses of the Moderna vaccine. According to Haaretz, the first 2000 doses were delivered on 1 February 2021. Palestine is expected to receive 37,000 doses of the PfizerBioNTech vaccine starting in mid-February via COVAX.

Speaking at a joint press conference with Russian ambassador to Palestine Gocha Buachidze, Minister of Health Mai Alkaila said the first batch of 10,000 doses of the Sputnik V vaccine received on 4 February 2021 will be allocated to five thousand mainly medical staff in Palestine. 50,000 more doses are expected during the next week, and that other batches of the Russian vaccine are expected to gradually enter the country during upcoming months. More doses are expected from COVAX, China and other friendly countries. A vaccination program has been developed with WHO.

When the first consignment of 2,000 coronavirus SputnikV vaccines intended for frontline health workers within the Strip did arrived at the frontier on Monday 15 February, its transit was blocked by Israeli border officials. The authority for such shipments ultimately lies with the Israeli Prime Minister's office unit dealing with national security. Officials said the delay in the passage of the medicines was due to the fact that the issue is still under review. On 17 February 2021, Gaza received a thousand doses of the Sputnik vaccine. An initial attempt at delivery had been blocked by Israel.

Israel began vaccinating Palestinian workers on 8 March 2021. Doses have been allocated for 120,000 Palestinian workers who have permits to enter and work in Israel. According to Israeli authorities, as of 11 March, over 50,000 have been vaccinated. As of 18 March 2021, according to COGAT 105,000 had received a first dose and expected to get a second dose in the coming weeks.

By 9 March 2021, for the West Bank and Gaza's 5.2 million inhabitants, roughly 34,700 vaccine units had been delivered, some from Russia and Israel, but over half (20,000) from the United Arab Emirates with these destined for the people of Gaza. The Palestinian Authority was criticised for allocating 10% of doses received for Palestinian VIPs.

On 17 March 2021, Palestine received 38,000 doses of the Pfizer/BioNTech vaccine and 24,000 of the AstraZeneca vaccine, via the COVAX scheme. The National Vaccine Deployment Plan is scheduled to begin on 21 March 2021. On 29 March 2021, Palestine received 100,000 doses of the Sinopharm BIBP vaccine donated by China, the largest single donation received by Palestine.

According to WHO, as of 15 April 2021, 223,140 vaccine doses have been delivered to the West bank and 83,300 to Gaza with 72,000 doses via COVAX expected on 17 April 2021. As regards the latter, 43,200 doses for the West Bank and 28,800 for Gaza are confirmed as delivered. On 20 April 2021, Mai Alkaila announced the purchase of 4.5 million doses of Pfizer and Sputnik V vaccines for $27.5 million, expected to arrive "soon".

On 18 June 2021, the Israeli Government announced that it had entered into an agreement with the Palestinian Authority to transfer at least one million doses of the Pfizer–BioNTech COVID-19 vaccine to the Palestinian Authority. These vaccines were reportedly scheduled to expire soon. Later that day, the Palestinian Authority cancelled the deal.Palestinian Health Minister Mai al-Kaila justified the cancellation on the grounds that the vaccines' expiry dates were closer than initially claimed by the Israelis and that the Palestinian Authority had rejected Israeli demands that none of the vaccines be transferred to the Gaza Strip and that the contract not be signed by the State of Palestine. Though Israel used the same vaccines for the Israeli teens. South Korea received near expiry date vaccines as part of the swap deal. In June, the Palestinians cancelled a similar deal saying they had been told the jabs "would expire in July or August, but, when they arrived, the marked date was June." The Korea Disease Control and Prevention Agency said that the vaccines are not the same as the ones given to South Korea. Later this statement was retracted and the Agency said it is not in position to comment on this issue as it "concerns diplomatic relations," and "The Korean government is not in the position to comment,"

As of 13 August 2021, about a quarter of Palestinians have been vaccinated, and the number is expected to rise further in coming weeks as new shipments arrive from a deal with Pfizer to purchase 4 million doses. By 29 August 2021, the World Health Organization reported that the Palestinians had received 2.8 million doses with the authorities in the West Bank and Gaza in the process of receiving or negotiating deals to obtain an additional 4.6 million doses. Palestinian officials estimated that more than 1.2 million doses had been administered. Al Jazeera and The New York Times also reported on vaccine hesitancy within the West Bank and Gaza. By 29 August 37% of eligible West Bank residents and 18% of Gaza residents had received at least one vaccine dose.

By 1 September 2021, Reuters reported that the Palestinian Territories had administered 1,340,889 COVID-19 vaccine doses and estimated that 14.9% of the population had received both vaccines.

== Outbreaks ==
=== Bethlehem ===
The city of Bethlehem became the first to experience an outbreak with confirmed cases in early March. Bethlehem was locked down on 7 March as 16 cases of infection were found in the West Bank, including nine cases in Bethlehem.

=== Palestinian refugee camps ===
The crowded Palestinian refugee camps face a grave threat if coronavirus spreads. On 22 April, a Palestinian from Syria became the first case reported in a refugee camp, located in the Wavel refugee camp in Bekaa, Lebanon. On 24 April, the Palestinian Ministry of Foreign Affairs and Expatriates (FAE) confirmed 4 more cases in Al-Jalil refugee camp, raising the total to five.

=== Breakdown by district ===
The tables below show fortnightly confirmed total COVID-19 cases for Palestine and periodically by Governorates of Palestine. The source data can be referenced on a daily basis. Breakdown for recoveries may lag behind the main total figures reported.

Total COVID-19 in Palestine as of 23 September 2021
Governorate	Cases	Deaths	Recoveries	Active cases
Total (12 Governorates)	392,452	3,980	358,706	29,766
East Jerusalem (Note: The figures for East Jerusalem are not included in the global figures for West Bank and Gaza but daily reporting does include these figures.)	29858	268	28966	624
Total	422,310	4,248	387,672	30,390

By Governorate as of 24 September 2020
Governorate	Cases	Deaths	Recoveries	Active cases
Hebron Governorate	16262	150	14322	1790
Bethlehem Governorate	2771	17	1602	1152
Gaza Strip (Note: Includes Deir el-Balah and Khan Yunis governorates.)	2613	17	850	1746
Jenin Governorate	931	3	657	271
Jericho Governorate	1353	3	1133	217
Nablus Governorate	2599	22	1698	879
Ramallah and al-Bireh Governorate	4144	19	2166	1959
Salfit Governorate	392	1	248	143
Tulkarm Governorate	1082	8	598	476
Qalqilya Governorate	1536	17	788	731
Tubas Governorate	300	3	224	73
Jerusalem Governorate	3608	14	2648	946
Total (12 Governorates)	37,591	274	26,934	10,383

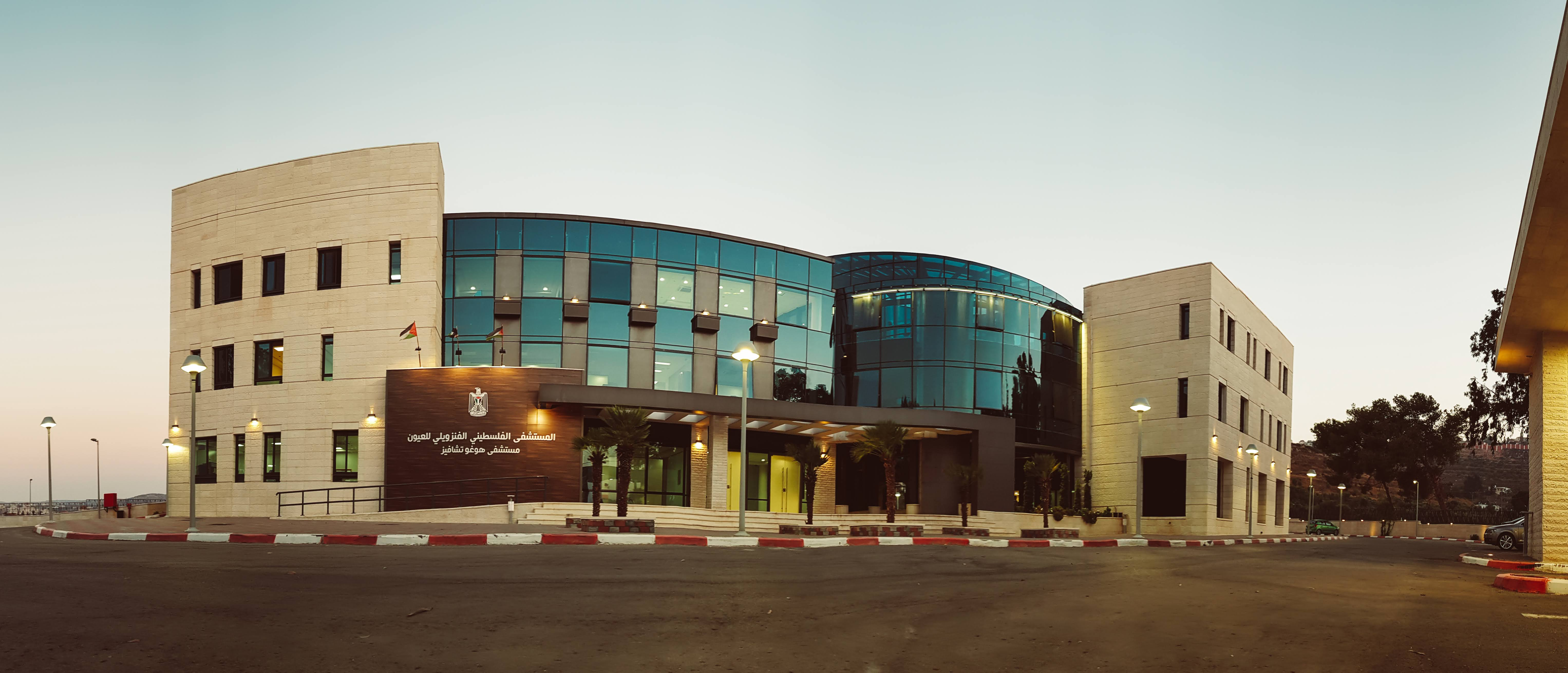
Hugo Chávez Hospital on 3 August 2020, which is used as a center for treating cases of COVID-19 in Palestine

=== East Jerusalem ===
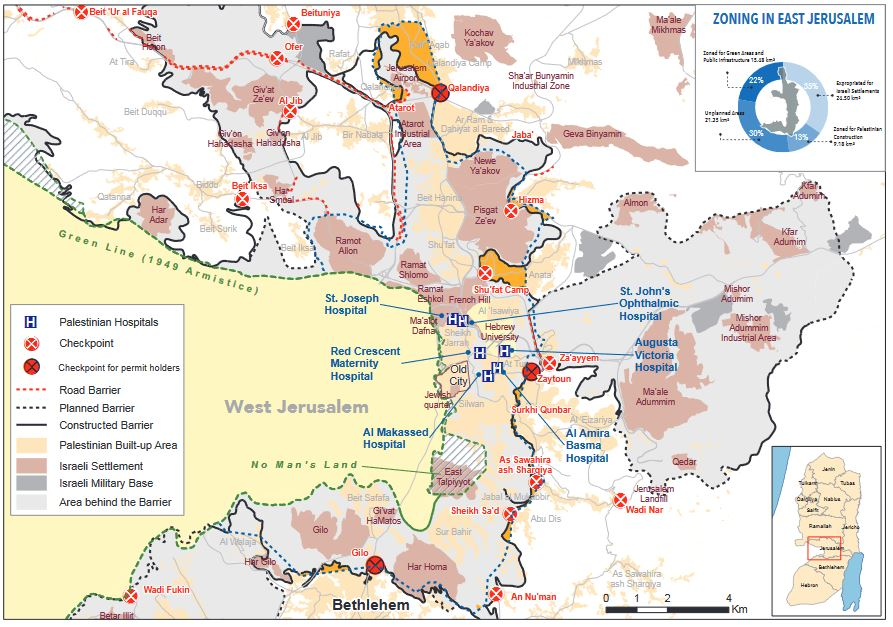
East Jerusalem Hospital Network

According to WHO, cases from East Jerusalem are managed by the East Jerusalem Hospitals Network (EJHN) and hospitals in Israel and 10 testing centres were opened by Israeli health authorities in Shuafat, Shuafat refugee camp, Silwan, Sur Baher, Jabal Mukaber, Beit Safafa, and Jerusalem. EJHN includes six hospitals: Makassed Islamic Charitable Society Hospital, Augusta Victoria Hospital, Palestine Red Crescent Society Hospital, St John of Jerusalem Eye Hospital Group, Jerusalem Princess Basma Centre, and Saint Joseph Hospital. In September 2018 the U.S. cut $25 million in funding, representing 40% of costs for these hospitals.

Israeli officials have expressed concern that the virus might spread in Arab neighbourhoods of East Jerusalem that are part of municipal Jerusalem but on the far side of the West Bank barrier. Kafr Aqab, which has 60–70,000 residents, and Shuafat Refugee Camp with around 80,000 have not been receiving a sufficient level of services.

On 20 May 2020, it was announced that the European Union (€13 million), Finland (€3 million), and Italy (€1 million) are making a contribution totalling €17 million in support of the payment of medical referrals to East Jerusalem Hospitals.

On 17 June 2020, the EU and WHO delivered personal protective equipment and medical items to the EJHN. The delivery includes personal protective equipment and disinfectant items for all six of the network's hospitals including 56,000 pairs of gloves; 10,000 surgical gowns and 1,600 overall gowns and 2,050 shoe covers and 100 medical protective goggles; 6,000 N-95 masks and 115,000 surgical masks and 4,100 face shields; 6,300 bottles of alcogel; 120 thermometers and 200 bottles of alcohol for disinfectant plus disinfectant spray and wipes.

Between Monday, 20 July and Tuesday, 21 July 2020, East Jerusalem registered the highest number of cases since the beginning of the pandemic. Cases in East Jerusalem total 1,721, according to the Israeli Health Ministry and municipality. The IDF Home Front Command is in charge in East Jerusalem but since some residents go to Palestinian clinics for testing there is some uncertainty about total numbers. (Note: according to corona.ps, the total is 1881 as of 22 July 2020) (Note: The figures for East Jerusalem are not included in the global figures for West Bank and Gaza but daily reporting does include these figures.)

==== July ====
Extended content

As of 13 July 2020 there were 55 new cases for a total of 862, with 174 recoveries and 3 deaths for a total of 685 active cases. As of 14 July 2020 there were 108 new cases for a total of 970, 793 active. As of 15 July 2020 there were 119 new cases for a total of 1089, 912 active. As of 16 July 2020 there were 115 new cases for a total of 1204, 1027 active. As of 17 July 2020 there were 87 new cases for a total of 1291, 1114 active. As of 18 July 2020 there were 92 new cases for a total of 1383, 1206 active. As of 19 July 2020 there were 120 new cases for a total of 1503, 1326 active. As of 20 July 2020 there were 101 new cases for a total of 1604, 1437 active. As of 21 July 2020 there were 91 new cases for a total of 1695, 1518 active. As of 22 July 2020 there were 186 new cases for a total of 1881, 1704 active. As of 23 July 2020 there were 250 new cases for a total of 2131, 1454 active. As of 24 July 2020 there were 188 new cases for a total of 2319, 1642 active. As of 25 July 2020 there were 170 new cases for a total of 2489, 1512 active. As of 26 July 2020 there were 167 new cases for a total of 2656, 1679 active. As of 27 July 2020 there were 180 new cases for a total of 2669, 1392 active. As of 28 July 2020 there were 164 new cases for a total of 3000, 1723 active. As of 29 July 2020 there were 174 new cases for a total of 3174, 1897 active. As of 30 July 2020 there were 116 new cases for a total of 3290, 2013 active. As of 31 July 2020 there were 105 new cases for a total of 3395, 2118 active.

==== August ====
Extended content

As of 1 August 2020 there were no new cases reported and figures remained unchanged. As of 2 August 2020 there were 88 new cases reported for a total of 3483, 2206 active. As of 3 August 2020 there were no new cases reported and figures remained unchanged. As of 4 August 2020 there were 375 new cases reported for a total of 3858, 2345 active. As of 5 August 2020 there were 58 new cases reported for a total of 3916, 2403 active. As of 6 August 2020 there were 120 new cases reported for a total of 4036, 2523 active. As of 7 August 2020 there were 190 new cases reported for a total of 4226, 1890 active. As of 8 August 2020 there were 220 new cases reported for a total of 4446, 2106 active. As of 9 August 2020 there were no new cases reported and figures remained unchanged except the number of fatalities rose to 7 from 3. As of 10 August 2020 there were 165 new cases reported for a total of 4611, 1823 active with 10 fatalities. As of 11 August 2020 there were 108 new cases reported for a total of 4719, 1722 active. As of 12 August 2020 there were 140 new cases reported for a total of 4909, 1754 active. As of 13 August 2020 there were 125 new cases reported for a total of 5034, 1674 active. As of 14 August 2020 there were 188 new cases reported for a total of 5222, 1798 active. As of 15 August 2020 there were 179 new cases reported for a total of 5401, 1870 active. As of 16 August 2020 there were no new cases reported and figures remained unchanged except the number of fatalities rose to 11 from 10. As of 17 August 2020 there were 146 new cases reported for a total of 5547, 1726 active. As of 18 August 2020 there were 150 new cases reported for a total of 5697, 1826 active. As of 19 August 2020 there were 124 new cases reported for a total of 5821, 1800 active. As of 20 August 2020 there were 129 new cases reported for a total of 5950, 1890 active. As of 21 August 2020 there were 124 new cases reported for a total of 6074, 1892 active. As of 22 August 2020 there were 148 new cases reported for a total of 6222, 1971 active. As of 23 August 2020 no new cases were reported while fatalities rose to 16. As of 24 August 2020 there were 142 new cases reported for a total of 6364, 2007 active. As of 25 August 2020 there were 120 new cases reported for a total of 6484, 1960 active. As of 26 August 2020 there were 125 new cases reported for a total of 6609, 2027 active. As of 27 August 2020 there were 100 new cases reported for a total of 6709, 2067 active. As of 28 August 2020 there were 150 new cases reported for a total of 6859, 2150 active. As of 29 August 2020 no new cases were reported and figures remained unchanged. As of 30 August 2020 no new cases were reported and figures remained unchanged. As of 31 August 2020 there were 350 new cases reported for a total of 7209, 1734 active.

==== September ====
Extended content

As of 1 September 2020 there were 0 new cases reported for a total of 7209, 1734 active and 21 fatalities. As of 2 September 2020 there were 249 new cases reported for a total of 7458, 1861 active and 22 fatalities. As of 3 September 2020 there were 0 new cases reported and figures remained unchanged. As of 4 September 2020 there were 217 new cases reported for a total of 7675, 1728 active and 22 fatalities. As of 5 September 2020 there were 0 new cases reported and figures remained unchanged. As of 6 September 2020 there were 210 new cases reported for a total of 7885, 1779 active and 22 fatalities. As of 7 September 2020 there were 137 new cases reported for a total of 8022, 1762 active and 22 fatalities. As of 8 September 2020 there were 133 new cases reported for a total of 8155, 1683 active and 25 fatalities. As of 9 September 2020 there were 140 new cases reported for a total of 8295, 1743 active and 25 fatalities. As of 10 September 2020 there were 255 new cases reported for a total of 8550, 1862 active and 26 fatalities. As of 11 September 2020 there were 60 new cases reported for a total of 8610, 1679 active and 28 fatalities. As of 12 September 2020 there were 0 new cases reported and figures remained unchanged. As of 13 September 2020 there were 326 new cases reported for a total of 8936, 1737 active and 29 fatalities. As of 14 September 2020 there were 0 new cases reported and figures remained unchanged. As of 15 September 2020 there were 230 new cases reported for a total of 9166, 1907 active and 32 fatalities. As of 16 September 2020 there were 207 new cases reported for a total of 9373, 1966 active and 33 fatalities. As of 17 September 2020 there were 134 new cases reported for a total of 9507, 1991 active and 34 fatalities. As of 18 September 2020 there were 129 new cases reported for a total of 9636, 1986 active and 36 fatalities. As of 19 September 2020 there were 124 new cases reported for a total of 9760, 1930 active and 38 fatalities. As of 20 September 2020 there were 0 new cases reported for a total of 9760, 1930 active and 38 fatalities. As of 21 September 2020 there were 146 new cases reported for a total of 9906, 1830 active and 44 fatalities. As of 22 September 2020 there were 128 new cases reported for a total of 10034, 1856 active and 45 fatalities. As of 23 September 2020 there were 0 new cases reported and figures remained unchanged. As of 24 September 2020 there were 205 new cases reported for a total of 10239, 1790 active and 48 fatalities. As of 25 September 2020 there were 80 new cases reported for a total of 10319, 1744 active and 49 fatalities. As of 26 September 2020 there were 0 new cases reported and figures remained unchanged. As of 27 September 2020 there were 170 new cases reported for a total of 10489, 1784 active and 52 fatalities. As of 28 September 2020 there were 85 new cases reported for a total of 10574, 1354 active and 54 fatalities. As of 29 September 2020 there were 0 new cases reported and figures remained unchanged. As of 30 September 2020 there were 68 new cases reported for a total of 10642, 1100 active and 57 fatalities.

=== Hebron district ===
- As of 16 June 2020 there were 118 (of 514) cases following a run of cases. As of 17 June, this rose to 135 (of 532) and later in the day to 150 (of 548).
- On 17 June 2020, Mai Alkaila said that the epidemic is resurgent as a result of contacts mainly with Palestinians from inside Israel or workers in Israel, explaining that 29 cases were recorded in the last 24 hours mainly in the district of Hebron. "All of this is because we are trying to get back to normal life in an effort to create a balance between the economy and health, but unfortunately the health protocol was not observed by almost all the institutions and citizens," she said.(Following this interview, 17 new cases were recorded in the West Bank, 16 in the Hebron district alone, bringing the total in the last 10 days of positive cases in Palestine to 74 and 46 in the last 24 hours).

==== June ====
Extended content

A further 3 cases in the evening of 17 June 2020, raised the Hebron district total to 154 (of 553). As of 18 June 2020, 178 (of 579) is being reported (updated in the afternoon to 197 (of 599)). Figures rose to 235 (of 639) as of 19 June 2020 (updated in the afternoon to 245 (of 663) and in the evening to 252 (of 673)). As of 20 June 2020, 284 (of 707) was reported (updated in the afternoon to 334 (of 954) and in the evening to 356 (of 978)). As of 21 June 2020, 397 (of 1022) was reported (evening update to 402 (of 1028)). As of 22 June 2020, 475 (of 1110) was reported (updated in the afternoon to 535 (of 1170) and in the evening to 549 (of 1184)). As of 23 June 2020, 627 (of 1284) was reported (updated later to 717 (of 1375)). As of 24 June 2020, figures reported are 829 (of 1517)(updated to 845 (of 1534)). As of 25 June 2020, figures reported are 868 (of 1568)(evening update to 886 (of 1588)). As of 26 June 2020, figures reported are 980 (of 1720)(updated to 1016 (of 1795)). As of 27 June 2020, figures reported are 1036 (of 1862)(updated to 1215 (of 2053)). As of 28 June 2020, figures reported are 1249 (of 2112)(updated to 1358 (of 2248)). As of 29 June 2020, figures reported are 1411 (of 2345)(evening update to 1491 (of 2443)). As of 30 June 2020, reported cases are 1671 (of 2698).

==== July ====
Extended content

As of 1 July 2020, cases reported were 1898 (evening updated to 1947). As of 2 July 2020, cases reported were 2146. As of 3 July 2020, cases reported were 2269. As of 4 July 2020, cases reported were 2673. As of 5 July, cases reported were 3247. As of 6 July 2020, cases reported were 3281. Daily reporting for 7 July 2020 has 3561 cases. Daily reporting for 8 July 2020 has 3877 cases. Daily reporting for 9 July 2020 has 4029 cases. Daily reporting for 10 July 2020 has 4292 cases. Daily reporting for 11 July 2020 has 4620 cases. Daily reporting for 12 July 2020 has 4786 cases. Daily reporting for 13 July 2020 has 4979 cases. Daily reporting for 14 July 2020 has 5138 cases. Daily reporting for 15 July 2020 has 5188 cases. Daily reporting for 16 July 2020 has 5370 cases. Daily reporting for 17 July 2020 has 5689 cases. Daily reporting for 18 July 2020 has 5888 cases. Daily reporting for 19 July 2020 has 6207 cases. Daily reporting for 20 July 2020 has 6349 cases. Daily reporting for 21 July 2020 has 6468 cases. Daily reporting for 22 July 2020 has 6622 cases. Daily reporting for 23 July 2020 has 6789 cases. Daily reporting for 24 July 2020 has 6895 cases. Daily reporting for 25 July 2020 has 6959 cases. Daily reporting for 26 July 2020 has 6999 cases. Daily reporting for 27 July 2020 has 7024 cases. Daily reporting for 28 July 2020 has 7204 cases. Daily reporting for 29 July 2020 has 7454 cases. Daily reporting for 30 July 2020 has 7640 cases. Daily reporting for 31 July 2020 has 7841 cases.

==== August ====
Extended content

Daily reporting for 1 August 2020 has 8060 cases. Daily reporting for 2 August 2020 has 8088 cases. Daily reporting for 3 August 2020 has 8219 cases. Daily reporting for 4 August 2020 has 8295 cases. Daily reporting for 5 August 2020 has 8453 cases. Daily reporting for 6 August 2020 has 8636 cases. Daily reporting for 7 August 2020 has 8845 cases. Daily reporting for 8 August 2020 has 8957 cases. Daily reporting for 9 August 2020 has 9129 cases. Daily reporting for 10 August 2020 has 9318 cases. Daily reporting for 11 August 2020 has 9477 cases. Daily reporting for 12 August 2020 has 9640 cases. Daily reporting for 13 August 2020 has 9747 cases. Daily reporting for 14 August 2020 has 9915 cases. Daily reporting for 15 August 2020 has 10019 cases. Daily reporting for 16 August 2020 has 10207 cases. Daily reporting for 17 August 2020 has 10331 cases. Daily reporting for 18 August 2020 has 10471 cases. Daily reporting for 19 August 2020 has 10586 cases. Daily reporting for 20 August 2020 has 10690 cases. Daily reporting for 21 August 2020 has 10830 cases. Daily reporting for 22 August 2020 has 10876 cases. Daily reporting for 23 August 2020 has 11052 cases. Daily reporting for 24 August 2020 has 11253 cases. Daily reporting for 25 August 2020 has 11484 cases. Daily reporting for 26 August 2020 has 11689 cases. Daily reporting for 27 August 2020 has 11954 cases. Daily reporting for 28 August 2020 has 12240 cases. Daily reporting for 29 August 2020 has 12388 cases. Daily reporting for 30 August 2020 has 12643 cases. Daily reporting for 31 August 2020 has 12892 cases.

==== September ====
Extended content

Daily reporting for 1 September 2020 has 13095 cases. Daily reporting for 2 September 2020 has 13328 cases. Daily reporting for 3 September 2020 has 13552 cases. Daily reporting for 4 September 2020 has 13772 cases. Daily reporting for 5 September 2020 has 13806 cases. Daily reporting for 6 September 2020 has 13938 cases. Daily reporting for 7 September 2020 has 14100 cases. Daily reporting for 8 September 2020 has 14244 cases. As of 9 September 2020 there were 102 new cases reported for a total of 14346, 3030 active and 121 fatalities. As of 10 September 2020 there were 101 new cases reported for a total of 14447, 3129 active and 123 fatalities. As of 11 September 2020 there were 157 new cases reported for a total of 14604, 2507 active and 125 fatalities. As of 12 September 2020 there were 85 new cases reported for a total of 14689, 2590 active and 127 fatalities. As of 13 September 2020 there were 150 new cases reported for a total of 14839, 2736 active and 131 fatalities. As of 14 September 2020 there were 164 new cases reported for a total of 15003, 2267 active and 132 fatalities. As of 15 September 2020 there were 162 new cases reported for a total of 15165, 2227 active and 134 fatalities. As of 16 September 2020 there were 130 new cases reported for a total of 15295, 1966 active and 139 fatalities. As of 17 September 2020 there were 185 new cases reported for a total of 15480, 2064 active and 139 fatalities. As of 18 September 2020 there were 131 new cases reported for a total of 15611, 2009 active and 140 fatalities. As of 19 September 2020 there were 63 new cases reported for a total of 15674, 2007 active and 141 fatalities. As of 20 September 2020 there were 115 new cases reported for a total of 15789, 1988 active, and 145 fatalities. As of 21 September 2020 there were 151 new cases reported for a total of 15940, 1926 active and 147 fatalities. As of 22 September 2020 there were 39 new cases reported for a total of 15979, 1767 active and 147 fatalities. As of 23 September 2020 there were 150 new cases reported for a total of 16129, 1793 active and 148 fatalities. As of 24 September 2020 there were 133 new cases reported for a total of 16262, 1790 active and 150 fatalities. As of 25 September 2020 there were 91 new cases reported for a total of 16353, 1796 active and 152 fatalities. As of 26 September 2020 there were 14 new cases reported for a total of 16367, 1672 active and 153 fatalities. As of 27 September 2020 there were 119 new cases reported for a total of 16486, 1634 active and 153 fatalities. As of 28 September 2020 there were 68 new cases reported for a total of 16554, 1538 active and 153 fatalities. As of 29 September 2020 there were 77 new cases reported for a total of 16631, 1483 active and 156 fatalities. As of 30 September 2020 there were 73 new cases reported for a total of 16704, 1372 active and 158 fatalities.

== Gaza Strip ==
=== Gaza outbreak ===
The first two cases in Gaza City, Gaza were diagnosed on 21 March. The International Committee of the Red Cross warned on 26 August that the health care system in the besieged Gaza Strip will not be able to deal with more than a few dozen patients. Gaza had managed to prevent community transmission of the virus through a strict quarantine regime, a situation that changed on 24 August with the announcement of confirmed cases outside of quarantine centers. On 31 August 2020, United Nations Humanitarian Coordinator Jamie McGoldrick, warning of imminent collapse in basic services, called for the immediate entry of fuel and other essential goods into the Gaza Strip. "The deterioration witnessed in recent weeks in the Gaza Strip is of grave concern," he said in a statement, He also added that "In addition, and marking a significant deterioration in the health situation, on 24 August, the first cases of COVID-19 outside the quarantine facilities were confirmed. Thus far, there are 280 known active cases, 243 of which are from community transmission." Power cuts are severely affecting hospitals as well as critical infrastructure. A WHO report of 27 August 2020 gives a summary of the situation.

On 7 September 2020, Nickolay Mladenov, the UN special coordinator for the Middle East peace process, announced the World Health Organization will act as temporary liaison to circumvent the coordination freeze between Israel and Palestine which, along with tightened Israeli restrictions, has prevented Gazans' access to medical treatment.

==== September ====
Extended content

The number of active cases rose from 280 as of 31 August to 319 on 1 September 402 on 2 September and 500 on 3 September. As of 4 September 2020 there were 116 new cases reported for a total of 697, 603 active and 5 fatalities. As of 5 September 2020 there were 110 new cases reported for a total of 807, 712 active and 6 fatalities. As of 6 September 2020 there were 162 new cases reported for a total of 969, 872 active and 8 fatalities. As of 7 September 2020 there were 182 new cases reported for a total of 1151, 1053 active and 9 fatalities. As of 8 September 2020 there were 118 new cases reported for a total of 1269, 1293 active and 9 fatalities. As of 9 September 2020 there were 87 new cases reported for a total of 1356, 1233 active and 9 fatalities. As of 10 September 2020 there were 195 new cases reported for a total of 1551, 1427 active and 10 fatalities. As of 11 September 2020 there were 80 new cases reported for a total of 1631, 1506 active and 11 fatalities. As of 12 September 2020 there were 88 new cases reported for a total of 1719, 1550 active and 13 fatalities. As of 13 September 2020 there were 100 new cases reported for a total of 1819, 1588 active and 15 fatalities. As of 14 September 2020 there were 108 new cases reported for a total of 1927, 1737 active and 15 fatalities. As of 15 September 2020 there were 79 new cases reported for a total of 2006, 1688 active and 15 fatalities. As of 16 September 2020 there were 94 new cases reported for a total of 2100, 1728 active and 16 fatalities. As of 17 September 2020 there were 76 new cases reported for a total of 2176, 1740 active and 16 fatalities. As of 18 September 2020 there were 47 new cases reported for a total of 2223, 1738 active and 17 fatalities. As of 19 September 2020 there were 90 new cases reported for a total of 2313, 1810 active and 17 fatalities. As of 20 September 2020 there were 45 new cases reported for a total of 2358, 1825 active and 17 fatalities. As of 21 September 2020 there were 42 new cases reported for a total of 2400, 1830 active and 17 fatalities. As of 22 September 2020 there were 45 new cases reported for a total of 2445, 1780 active and 17 fatalities. As of 23 September 2020 there were 73 new cases reported for a total of 2518, 1763 active and 17 fatalities. As of 24 September 2020 there were 95 new cases reported for a total of 2613, 1746 active and 17 fatalities. As of 25 September 2020 there were 45 new cases reported for a total of 2658, 1701 active and 17 fatalities. As of 26 September 2020 there were 67 new cases reported for a total of 2725, 1646 active and 19 fatalities. As of 27 September 2020 there were 66 new cases reported for a total of 2791, 1595 active and 21 fatalities. As of 28 September 2020 there were 35 new cases reported for a total of 2826, 1485 active and 21 fatalities. As of 29 September 2020 there were 85 new cases reported for a total of 2911, 1420 active and 21 fatalities. As of 29 September 2020 there were 85 new cases reported for a total of 2911, 1420 active and 21 fatalities. As of 30 September 2020 there were 37 new cases reported for a total of 2948, 1332 active and 21 fatalities.

=== Management in the Gaza Strip ===
Brigadier General Faiq Al-Mabhouh was the leader of the Crisis Management Team in the Ministry of Interior during the COVID-19 pandemic in the Gaza Strip. Mabhouh played a prominent role in communicating with the public about the changing situation. He regularly appeared in video announcements on Al-Aqsa TV and social media channels, and gave interviews to local media to explain changes in restrictions. The Gaza Strip restrictions took the "flattening the curve" approach of slowing the spread of infections rather than preventing them completely. The restrictions imposed were similar to those imposed by most western countries, and much more relaxed than China, Australia, or other Western Pacific nations that maintained a zero COVID policy. They tried to avoid full lockdowns by implementing partial measures like weekend (Friday to Saturday) lockdowns and curfew. The Friday to Saturday lockdowns included mosques being closed for Friday prayers. But during times while the mosques were open, one creative measure initiated by Gaza’s Ministry of Health was to replace the mosque preachers with doctors who gave health information seminars.

== Timeline ==
=== March to December 2020 ===
Extended content

==== March 2020 ====
Extended content

5 March:

- Seven COVID-19 disease cases were confirmed near Bethlehem in the West Bank. The Palestinian health ministry said the cases had first been detected at a hotel in the Bethlehem area, where a group of Greek tourists had visited the hotel in late February, with two later diagnosed with the virus. The Church of the Nativity closed temporarily after 2 Greek visitors that later tested positive were visiting hotels in the area.
- As a result, the Palestinian government announced a complete ban on entry of foreign tourists. The Palestinian government declared a state of emergency in the West Bank on 5 March. Schools, universities, mosques and churches were closed for one month.

7 March:

- On 7 March, there were 22 cases of infections.
- The City of Bethlehem was locked down as 16 cases of infection are found in the West Bank, including nine cases in Bethlehem. The lockdown is imposed by Israeli military as Israel controlled all entrances to the West Bank. According to the Israeli defence ministry, the lockdown of Bethlehem is imposed in coordination with Palestinian authorities.

9 March:

- Palestinian authorities announce that there are 5 more cases on the West Bank. Four cases were recorded in Bethlehem, and one in Tulkarm.

13 March

- The Palestinian Ministry of Health (MOH) confirmed 35 coronavirus cases on 13 March, mostly concentrated in the Bethlehem Governorate.

14 March

- 3 new cases have been announced, bringing the total to 38 cases.

16 March

- A second case was confirmed in Tulkarm raising the number in Palestine to 39. Prime Minister Mohammad Shtayyeh said that Kuwait has contributed $5.5 million to help the Palestinians overcome coronavirus.

18 March

- The number of cases has risen to 44. 40 cases are from Bethlehem, two from Tulkarm, one from Ramallah and another from Nablus.
- Israeli Minister of Defense, Naftali Bennett said "Starting Wednesday, those West Bank-based Palestinians, who happen to work or trade in vital sectors, such as health, agriculture and building, can reside in Israel". More than 100,000 Palestinian workers from the West Bank who work in Israel, usually return home on a daily basis.
- Yotam Shefer of COGAT announced the closing of Palestinian-administered areas of the West Bank on Wednesday to limit the spread of coronavirus, telling journalists the decision had been made in conjunction with the Palestinian Authority.
- Israel and the Palestinian Authority have set up a joint operations room to combat the pandemic, PA government spokesman Ibrahim Milhem revealed. An Israeli Defense Ministry official confirmed that a joint operations room has been set up with the Palestinians, but declined to provide further details.
- The United Nations Humanitarian Coordinator for the occupied Palestinian Territories Jamie McGoldrick announced during a video conference with Mohammed Shtayyeh one million dollars of urgent joint financial support from multiple United Nations organisations to provide health aid and technical support to Palestine to help it confront the outbreak.

19 March

- Ibrahim Milhem confirmed three new cases bringing the total to 47. He said in the daily briefing that two cases were students returning home from France and quarantined before being in contact with anyone. The third is for a person from Nablus previously suspected of having the disease and was kept in home quarantine.

20 March

- The Minister of Health, Dr. Mai Al-Kaila, announced that 17 of the 19 cases who had been in quarantine in Bethlehem had recovered. The Minister said at a press conference held this Friday morning in Ramallah, that 17 patients who were in health quarantine in the city of Bethlehem will be allowed, after confirming their recovery, as they will be allowed to go to the house, with an emphasis on them to adhere to the home quarantine, and taking into account the measurement of temperature from time to time.
- The Minister also announced a new case, a Palestinian from Salfit Governorate coming from Pakistan.

21 March

- Mai Kaileh confirmed four new cases bringing the total to 52. Three of the new cases were students from Ramallah returning from the United Kingdom and the fourth was a physician from Hebron who contracted the disease while working at the Israeli Hadassah Ein Karem hospital.
- On 21 March, Palestinian sources confirmed the first two cases in Gaza, which originated from Pakistan; the two Palestinians had travelled from Pakistan and had entered Gaza through Egypt. Once they had tested positive for the virus and they were placed in quarantine in Rafah since their arrival on 19 March.
- The Palestinian Health Ministry said that 53 cases have been confirmed in the West Bank.

22 March

- The spokesman for the Palestinian government updated the total number of cases in Palestine to 59 including the 2 cases in Gaza.
- The Palestine News Network said that newspaper Yediot Aharonot reported a WHO delegation arriving in Gaza via the Beit Hanoun Erez crossing.
- Following a meeting of the National Emergency, Prime Minister Shtayyeh announced a ban for 2 more weeks on movement between and inside of Palestinian cities for two weeks as of 10:00 PM with the exception of health facilities, pharmacies, bakeries, and grocery stores.

23 March

- The state-run Qatari Committee to Rebuild Gaza announced on Twitter that it will send $150 million in aid over a six-month period to support United Nations humanitarian programmes and efforts to help combat the new coronavirus outbreak.

24 March

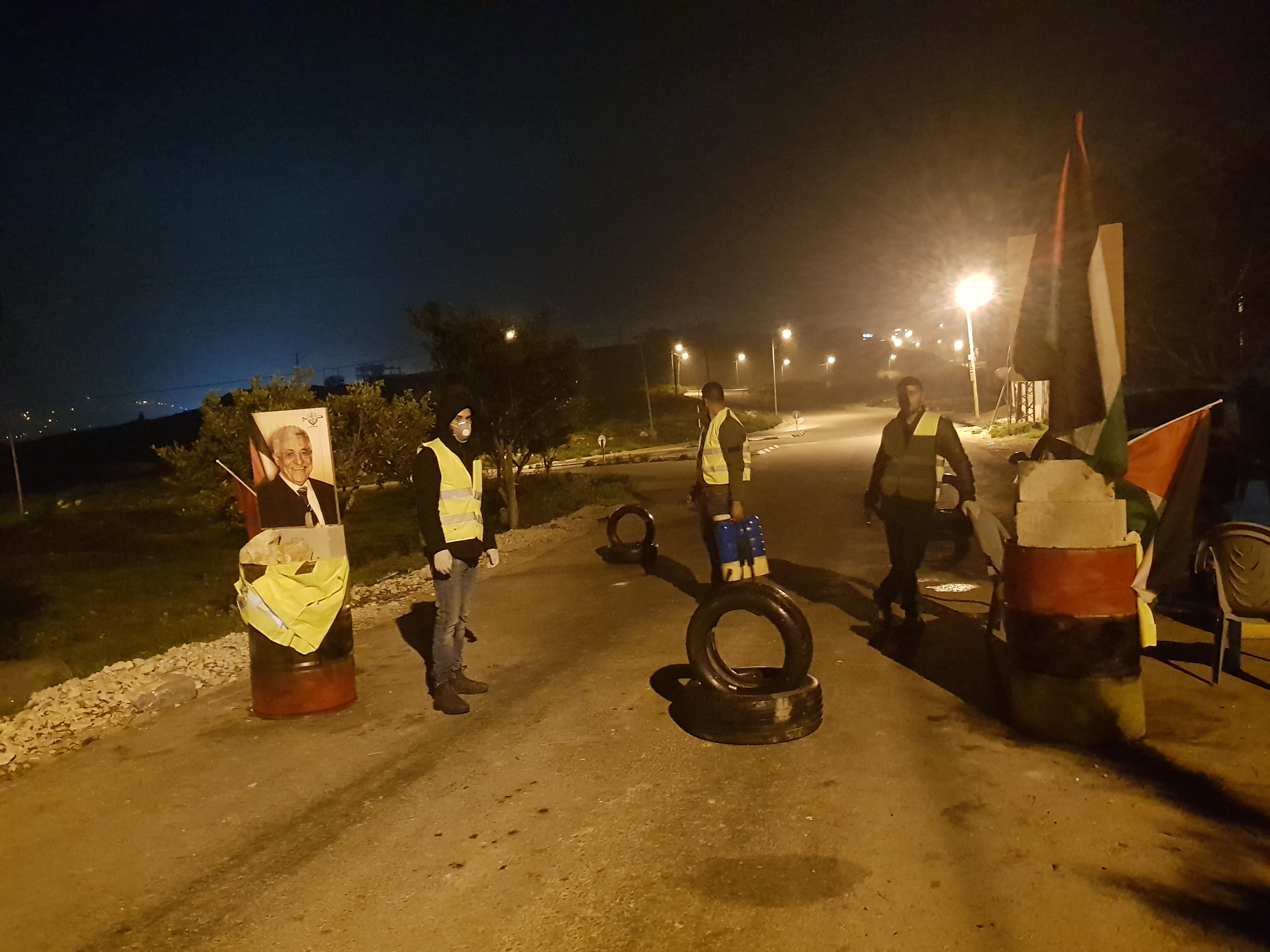
Workers at a quarantine site in Qusin.

- The daily briefing confirmed the 60th case in Ramallah, who was a woman in her forties returning from the United States, and was immediately quarantined. A person who was previously reported as recovered was found on later testing to still have the disease.

25 March

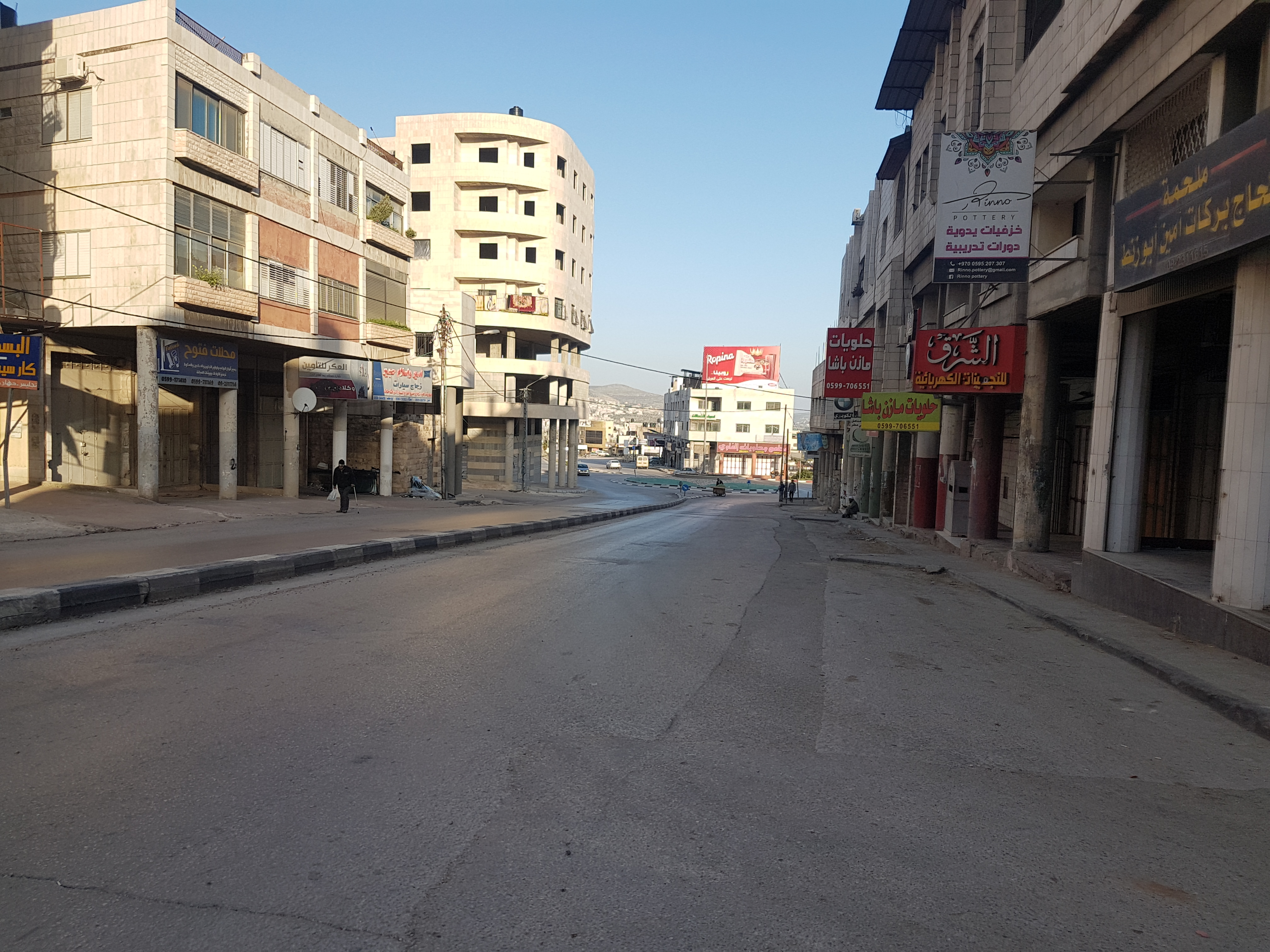
Amman Street in the city of Nablus is empty due to the mandatory quarantine in Palestine.

- The daily briefing confirmed a rise to 62 cases with one being the daughter of the woman who had returned from the US and had tested positive on 24 March and the other being a 62-year-old woman from a village near Ramallah.
- Reporting the first fatality in the country, a woman aged 60 died. Ibrahim Melhem said "The woman had experienced symptoms and was later hospitalized" before succumbing to the illness. The woman was from Biddu, north of Jerusalem and southwest of Ramallah. There are now 62 confirmed cases in the West Bank and two in the Gaza Strip. The two new cases are for the dead woman's son, 46, and his wife, 41.
- Israel is set to release two out of four Palestinian prisoners in the evening, (both Nablus residents), who have been under quarantine in the Ramla Prison Clinic for ten days as a precautionary measure on suspicion of contracting the virus after coming into contact with an ill Israeli prison officer. The prisoners are to be delivered to Palestinian medics at Beit Sira military checkpoint, west of Ramallah city.

26 March

- Ibrahim Milhem confirmed 13 new cases in the village of Biddu bringing the total in Palestine to 86. Tests on people who had been in contact with the woman who died on 25 March confirmed 13 new cases, bringing the total in that village to 18. Of the 86 cases, 9 are in Gaza, including seven who were confirmed positive earlier in the day and who had who came in contact at the Gaza quarantine center with the two confirmed cases held there. 17 cases in Bethlehem have recovered and have been sent to home quarantine for 14 days.

27 March

- Palestine Friday morning confirmed seven new cases, raising the total to 91; 5 were from Biddu and 2 were identified from 227 Palestinian workers who had returned from Israeli settlements, a man who worked as a gas station worker in Gush Etzion, north of Bethlehem, and his mother, who worked as a cleaner in a nearby settlement. West Bank hospitals have 205 ventilating machines, and as of this date corona tests had been performed on 5,562 people.

28 March

- The daily briefing confirmed 6 new cases bringing the total to 97. Three cases in Artas included the 62-year-old husband of an infected woman as well as her 19-year-old and 17-year-old nephews and a further case being her sister from Beit Iskaria while two other cases were in Jerusalem area villages – a 29-year-old man from Hizma and a woman in her 20s from Al-Qubeiba, Jerusalem who was infected after socialising with an infected sister in Biddu.
- The National COVID-19 Response Plan specifies a requirement of $120 million over 90 days. On 27 March 2020, the humanitarian clusters released an updated inter-agency multi-sectoral COVID-19 response plan in support of this totalling $34 million over 90 days and forming a part of the global UN appeal launched on 25 March 2020.

29 March

- Ibrahim Milhem confirmed seven new cases in the West Bank, bringing the total in Palestine to 104. Six cases were confirmed in the village of Qatanna, northwest of Jerusalem and a woman in her 30s from nearby Al-Qubeiba.
- Mohammad Shtayyeh announced two more cases in the West Bank, bringing the total to 106. At a press conference in Ramallah he said the two cases were for a Palestinian in the village of Qatanna and another in the Hebron Governorate. Additionally, Shtayyeh gave a government estimate of 12 cases among the Palestinian population of East Jerusalem and currently being treated in Israeli hospitals.
- Two new cases in the West Bank bring the total in Palestine to 108, said Mohammad Milhem. The two new cases are the husband and the son of a woman in Hebron diagnosed earlier with the disease. Two more people recovered in Bethlehem bringing total recoveries to 20, all of whom, bar one, were among the first to get the disease in Bethlehem.

30 March

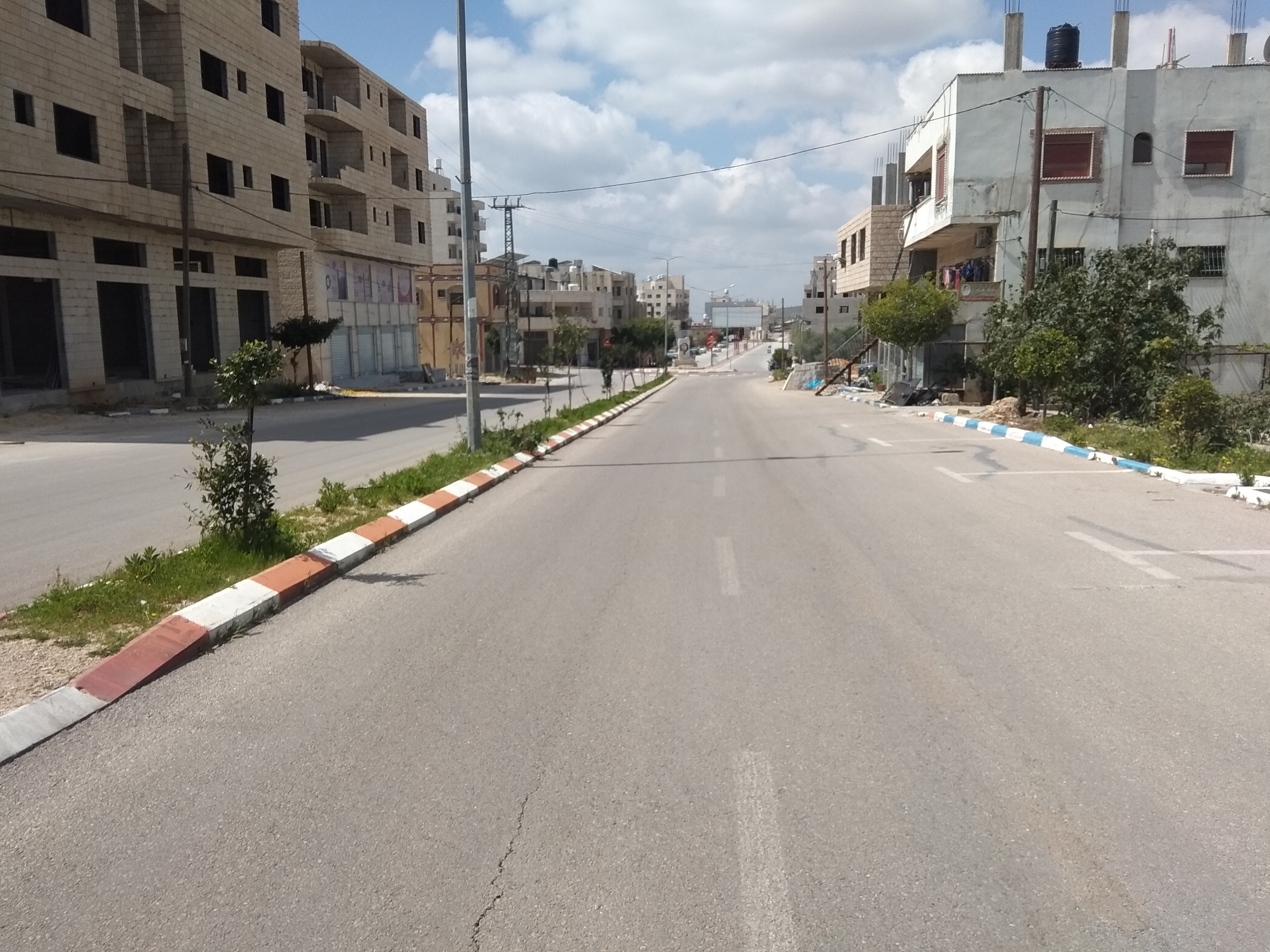
Al-Madīnah al-Munawwarah Street in Salfit is empty due to the outbreak in Palestine.

- Ibrahim Melhem confirmed 7 new cases in Qatanna bringing the total number of cases to 115.
- In Gaza, more than 1760 people are in one of 25 designated quarantine facilities including at Rafah crossing quarantine centre or designated quarantine facilities. The quarantine period will be extended from two to three weeks (21 days). Those coming from crossings at Rafah or Erez have been quarantined since 15 March.
  - Home quarantine ended on 26 March for those who entered Gaza 14 days prior.
- The Ministry of Health limited public primary healthcare service delivery to 14 centers distributed across the five governorates, providing essential services only.

31 March

- Ibrahim Melhem confirmed 2 new cases, one in Ramallah and the second a man who returned to the Gaza Strip last week through the Rafah crossing and was placed in confinement since then. This brings the total number of cases to 117 of which 10 are in Gaza.

==== April 2020 ====
Extended content

1 April

- Fifteen new cases were confirmed in the West Bank today and 2 more in Gaza, bringing total in West Bank to 122 and in Palestine in general to 134, according to government spokesman Mohammad Milhem. The 15 were Palestinians who worked at a poultry factory in the Atarot industrial area of East Jerusalem. Milhem said Israel had communicated the possibility of the workers being infected and that although nine of the infected workers who were in one bus were taken straight from the factory to quarantine centers in Ramallah, the rest crossed Israeli military checkpoints, went to their villages and mingled with people before they were detected, which could raise the number of infected once tests are conducted.
- Israel has linked possible assistance for Gaza's efforts to combat the disease to progress in Israel's recovering the remains of two soldiers killed in the 2014 war.

2 April

- Palestinian Health Ministry spokesman Kamal Shakhra confirmed 21 new cases bringing the total to 155, most of the cases being Palestinians who worked in Israel and returned home along with those who were in contact with them. 20 were from the Ramallah and Jerusalem-area villages and one in Hebron. Workers returning home this week while Israel celebrates Passover were asked to isolate themselves at their homes for two weeks. The Health Ministry plans to check an estimated 60,000 workers as they return.
- The United Nations Relief and Works Agency for Palestine Refugees in the Near East resumed the distribution of food aid in the Gaza Strip on 31 March. Food baskets are now delivered directly to beneficiaries' homes as a precautionary measure by UNRWA, to prevent gatherings as part of its steps to reduce and prevent the spread of the coronavirus.
- The number of confirmed cases rose to 161, five of them related to the Atarot poultry farm where 250 Palestinian workers who work there have yet to be tested plus one other in Beitunia.

3 April

- Ibrahim Milhem announced ten new cases bringing the total to 171, residents of Biddu, Qatanna, Hizma and Tulkarem. Test results for the 250 Palestinian workers from the Atarot poultry plant are due later.
- President Abbas declared a State of Emergency.
- Prime Minister Mohammad Shtayyeh confirmed another 22 cases that brings the total to 193. The Prime Minister stressed that the next two weeks will be difficult as around 45,000 Palestinian workers in Israel return from their workplace in Israel. Shtayyeh added, "We are trying hard to arrange the return of the workers with the Israeli side so that we can take the necessary health measures. We hope that Israel will agree to this, as this virus is the enemy of all mankind and knows no borders, gender or religion," he said. "We also asked Israel to check the workers prior to their arrival."

4 April

- Kamal Shakhra confirmed 11 new cases of coronavirus which together with the case from Halhoul raised the total to 205. All but three were Palestinian workers in a poultry factory in Lod apparently owned by the same person as the Atarot poultry factory. Three cases were in Beitunia, three in Qatanna, one in Beit 'Anan, two in Tulkarm refugee camp and two were in Surif. Out of the 205 cases, 12 are located in Gaza, among whom three have recovered.
- Ibrahim Milhem confirmed 5 more cases and at the evening briefing, Kamal Shakhra confirmed a further 6 cases for a total of 216. The five cases were three from Halhul, the fourth case was from nearby Yatta and the fifth from Qarawat Bani Zaid. The additional six cases were reported in the governorates of Jerusalem, Bethlehem, and Ramallah. The rapid increase in cases is attributed to the gradual return of Palestinian workers in Israel and Israeli settlements to their homes.

5 April

- Kamal Shakhra confirmed nine more cases bringing the total to 226. The nine cases were reported in the governorates of Ramallah, Jenin, and Jerusalem. Ibrahim Milhem confirmed two new cases from Bethlehem area villages, six more in Beitunia which now is subject of a total lockdown, a case from the town of Sair and two others in Biddo, bringing the total to 237.

6 April

- Kamal Shakhra confirmed 15 new cases for a total 252 cases at the daily briefing following 11 cases from two families in the Biddo, Qatanna and Jdeireh villages. Interior Ministry spokesman Ghassan Nimr said Biddo, Qatanna and Jdeireh villages had 99 cases alone, mainly caused by social visits. He said Bethlehem district had 52 cases and Ramallah district 58 cases, followed by 13 in the Hebron district, and the rest in other West Bank areas.
- A new total figure of 254 including a new case in Gaza was reported late in the day.

7 April

- Kamal Shakhra confirmed 6 more cases bringing the total to 260.
- Al Quds University President, Professor Imad Abu Kishek announced that his university has "succeeded in producing a fully computerized ventilator capable of saving lives and providing a viable alternative to the shortage in Palestine and beyond in the standard commercial ventilators and other respiratory support machines". The Palestinian Ministry of Health had reported that only 250 medical ventilators are available throughout all Palestinian hospitals and that two-thirds of these machines are already in use. The ventilators should be ready for production as soon as the Palestinian Standard Institute (PSI) gives its final approval to the prototype.

8 April

- The daily briefing confirmed 2 new cases for a total 263. A total of 44 cases have recovered, 36 in the West Bank and eight in Gaza.
- The Commissioner-General of the United Nations Relief and Works Agency for Palestine Refugees (UNRWA), Philippe Lazzarini and Dr. Mohammad Shtayyeh met by teleconference and discussed the situation of Palestine refugees, particularly in the face of the pandemic. The Commissioner-General updated the Prime Minister on the Agency's prevention and response plans and efforts to raise needed funds. He also briefed the Prime Minister on the situation of Palestinian refugees in Jordan, Lebanon, and Syria.

9 April

- At the daily briefing Kamal Shakhra said that there were no new cases and gave a breakdown of the 263 cases to date, being 89 workers in Israel, 103 that were in close contact with infected cases, 29 among travellers, 40 cases that were in contact with the tourists in Bethlehem,1 medical staff and a prisoner. Shakhra said a total of 16,068 tests had been conducted since 5 March.
- Meeting with Mohammed Shtayyeh, the European Union representative, Sven Kühn von Burgsdorff announced an assistance package of around €71 million in response to the Palestinian Authority's COVID-19 Response Plan for dealing with the pandemic including contributing €9.5 million more to the six East Jerusalem hospitals.

10 April

- Ibrahim Milhem confirmed 3 new cases, one from Halhul and two cases from Artas for a total of 266. Recoveries increased to 45, including 9 in Gaza. He also confirmed a second death, of a resident of Barta'a.
- The United Kingdom announced two support packages worth $1m to purchase medical supplies for health systems through UNICEF and WHO.
- Ibrahim Milhem confirmed a new case in Bani Na'im for a total of 267.

11 April

- Kamal Shakhra confirmed a new case in Jdeireh for a total of 268 while recovered cases reached 46.
- The Ministry of Health announced 11 recovered cases, bringing the total number to 57.

12 April

- A Palestinian worker showing coronavirus symptoms was left today by Israeli settlers outside Burkan said Abdullah Kmail, the Governor of Salfit.

13 April

- Ibrahim Milhem confirmed three cases, two overnight from Hebron and another from Rafat for a total 272 while recoveries rose to 59. He also said there were unconfirmed 36 corona cases in occupied East Jerusalem, which would bring the total in all the occupied Palestinian territories to 308.

14 April

- Kamal Shakhra confirmed 10 new cases for a total of 284, 5 from Izzarieh, 3 from Rafat and 1 each from Jenin and Hebron with recoveries rising to 64.
- In East Jerusalem, medical professionals estimate that at least 80 patients have been diagnosed. Half the patients are said to be in Silwan. On 12 April, three cases were identified in Issawiya, two of whom work in the health system and in nursing homes, and the first patient was identified in Shuafat refugee camp. In response to increasing concern, the government announced that three more testing clinics would open in East Jerusalem, in Silwan, in Kafr Aqab and in Shuafat refugee camp.
- At the evening briefing, Ibrahim Milhem confirmed 3 more cases bringing the total to 287.

15 April

- Minister of Health Mai Alkaila confirmed 3 new cases in the West Bank today. Together with a new case reported late yesterday in Kharbatha al-Misbah this raised the total cases to 291. The three cases were medics apparently infected while working at Augusta Victoria hospital in East Jerusalem. Alkaila also said that it is believed there are 78 positive corona cases in East Jerusalem although this cannot be confirmed as Israel does not report the figure.
- A testing clinic in Silwan was closed down because the kits were supplied by the Palestinian Authority and Israel prohibits PA activity in Jerusalem. The Israeli Health Ministry recently opened a testing clinic in Silwan but it is only accessible to members of the Clalit health maintenance organisation.
- Three new cases were confirmed including one from Bethlehem area who had previously recovered, bringing the total to 293. It is thought that there are 81 cases in East Jerusalem after 3 new cases were reported in Jabal al-Mukabber.

16 April

- Mai Alkaila confirmed a new case bringing the total to 294. The three new cases late yesterday were for two medics from Dheisheh refugee camp and from Obeidieh and the third a man from Kharbatha al-Misbah.
- The United States announced $5 million in aid "to meet immediate, life-saving needs in combating COVID-19," ending a two-year freeze of aid funds.

17 April

- Mai Alkaila confirmed 12 new cases bringing the total to 307 while there are thought to be 95 cases in East Jerusalem.The new cases are Palestinians working in Israel who had just returned home from their workplace or those who came in contact with them and came from Hebron, Ramallah, Jenin, Jerusalem, and Bethlehem. Another case was previously diagnosed in Bani Na'im. With eight recoveries in Ramallah, the total rose to 69.
- The UN Chief Antonio Guterres said that he asked the UN Special Coordinator for the Middle East Peace Process, Nikolay Mladenov, to work with Israeli officials to ensure the protection of the Palestinian detainees in Israeli prisons.

18 April

- Mai Alkaila confirmed 6 new cases raising the total to 313. She also confirmed that a 78-year-old Palestinian from Issawiya died, the first victim in East Jerusalem, where there are thought to be 105 cases.

19 April

- Six new cases were confirmed raising the total to 320, Mai Alkaila said today. The six new cases were of a woman from the Shuqba, 4 cases for four sisters from Kafr Aqab and a sixth case in Tulkarm.
- Ibrahim Milhem confirmed an additional two new cases in Yatta bringing the total to 322.

20 April

- Kamal Shakhra confirmed 7 new cases including 2 in Gaza for a total of 329. The cases include two from Beit Anan, two from Kafr Aqab and one from Nablus. Shakhra also said two people from Bethlehem who had recently recovered had once again tested positive for the disease, putting the total of recovered now at 69, including 11 in Gaza. There are thought to be 120 cases in East Jerusalem.

21 April

- Mai Alkaila confirmed no new cases were reported in the West Bank and Gaza Strip in the last 24 hours. All the patients at corona centers are in good health and no one is currently in ICU. There are thought to be 132 cases in East Jerusalem and two Palestinians have also died there. A total of 25,000 corona tests were conducted so far and the health ministry is now in a position to do 4000 tests a day.
- The Health Ministry confirmed this evening five new cases, raising the total number of confirmed cases to 334, including three Palestinians from Kafr Aqab and two others from Gaza.

22 April

- Mai Alkaila confirmed a new case in Kafr Aqab, bringing the total to 335. In addition, there are thought to be another 139 cases in East Jerusalem

23 April

- Mai Alkaila confirmed a new case in Dahrieh bringing the total cases to 336. There are also thought to be 144 cases from East Jerusalem neighbourhoods inside the West Bank barrier. Recoveries in the West Bank rose to 74.

24 April

- Mai Alkaila confirmed 4 new cases in Hebron, Bethlehem, and Jerusalem including a nurse working at the Augusta Victoria Hospital, for a total of 340 as well as 85 recoveries.

25 April

- Mai Alkaila confirmed 2 new cases were confirmed today bringing the total to 342 as well as an additional 9 cases in Shuafat refugee camp for a total of 495 including East Jerusalem.

26 April

- According to a WHO recent summary:

-342 cases including 325 in West Bank and 17 in Gaza Strip.

-153 cases and two deaths confirmed in East Jerusalem by the Palestinian Ministry of Health.

-The Inter-Agency COVID-19 response Plan was updated and released by the Health Cluster

-WHO delivered lab testing kits and essential medical supplies to Gaza Strip.

27 April

- Restaurants in the Gaza Strip were allowed to reopen.

28 April

- Mai Alkaila confirmed a new case in Bir Nabala and five other cases in the Ras Khamis area of Shufat refugee camp, two in Silwan, and one in the Old City. for a total of 501 (342 excluding East Jerusalem).

29 April

- Mai Alkaila confirmed a new case in Ubeidiya plus two cases in Shufat, one in al-Issawiya. one in Beit Safafa and another in al-Tur for a total of 507 (343 excluding East Jerusalem).

==== May 2020 ====
Extended content

1 May

- Mai Alkaila confirmed today 10 new cases, 8 in Beit Liqyat and 2 cases in Kharbatha al-Misbah and in Anata, raising the total number of confirmed cases in Palestine to 517 (353 excluding East Jerusalem).

3 May

- 500 Palestinians that were stranded abroad, arrived at the Karama Border Crossing in Jericho. Col. Mustafa Dawabsheh, director of the Karama Border Crossing police, said the Ministry of Health would administer tests to the passengers before they return home for a 14-day quarantine. 2000 other stranded Palestinians are scheduled to return in groups shortly.

4 May

- Mai Alkaila confirmed a new case in As-Samou' and 25 recoveries including 15 patients in Ramallah, seven in Bethlehem and three in Halhul.
- Mai Alkaila announced eight new cases in Hebron, six more from As-Samou', one from Hebron city and one from Adh-Dhahiriya.

5 May

- President Mahmoud Abbas declared a new state of emergency starting today for 30 days.
- Mai Alkaila confirmed 4 more cases in As-Samou' bringing the total to 366, as well as a further 25 recoveries raising the total number of recovered cases to 127.

6 May

- A further five new cases were confirmed last night in As-Samou' for total cases of 371 (if East Jerusalem cases are included, the total is 543).
- Mai Alkaila announced that the number of recovered cases increased to 222 in all Palestinian governorates, after registering 54 new recoveries. The minister said in a press release that 47 of the new recovery cases were recorded in the governorates of Ramallah, Al-Bireh, Hebron, Bethlehem and Jerusalem, while 7 cases were recorded from inside the city of Jerusalem. She pointed out that no new cases of coronavirus were recorded in Palestine, so that the total number of infections stabilised at 543, indicating that the percentage of recovery cases reached 40.8% of the total cases. Dr. Kamal Al-Shakhra said that this week saw about 100 new recovery cases reported, adding that the health status of all the injured in the isolation and treatment centers of the Ministry of Health is stable, and there is no patient inside the intensive care.

7 May

- Mai Alkaila this morning confirmed a new case in Hebron bringing the total in the West Bank to 355 and along with three cases confirmed in the Gaza Strip yesterday among arrivals from abroad bringing the total there to 20. Health cluster on 5 May 2020 co-chaired by the Ministry of Health and WHO focused on operational challenges faced by partners, particularly local NGOs in Gaza, East Jerusalem Hospitals and the need to ensure continuing essential primary health care services.

8 May

- Mai Alkaila said today that half of the cases in Palestine have fully recovered, 37 new recoveries were recorded during the past 24 hours and the total number of recoveries in Palestine now stands at 282 (226 excluding East Jerusalem).

9 May

- Mai Alkaila confirmed a further 39 recoveries bringing the totals for Palestine to 547 cases with 222 remaining active, 133 of them being in "occupied East Jerusalem and the outskirts of the city on the West Bank side of the Israeli Segregation Barrier". The corresponding West Bank and Gaza figures are 375, 118 active following 29 recoveries.

10 May

- The Rafah border crossing opened for three days this week to allow Palestinians stranded in Egypt to return home. The crossing has been closed since mid-March as part of precautionary measures to contain the spread of coronavirus in the Gaza Strip.
- Mai Alkaila confirmed 30 more recoveries bringing the totals for Palestine to 547 cases with 192 remaining active, the corresponding West Bank and Gaza figures being 375, 88 active following 30 recoveries. She said five governorates in the West Bank are currently virus-free, namely Tubas, Jericho, Jenin, Qalqilia, and Bethlehem.

11 May

- Mai Alkaila said that for the fourth day in a row, no new cases were reported in Palestine and confirmed 16 more recoveries bringing the totals for Palestine to 547, including 355 in the West Bank, 20 in the Gaza Strip and 172 in occupied East Jerusalem.

13 May

- Mai Alkaila confirmed total cases in Palestine, which includes East Jerusalem, the West Bank and the Gaza Strip, to 548. The West Bank has 355 cases and 20 in Gaza. Recoveries total 421 being 310 in the West Bank and Gaza and the rest in East Jerusalem. Alkaila said 123 cases are still active, including 60 in East Jerusalem, 17 in Jerusalem district villages under Palestinian Authority control, 13 in the Ramallah district, 24 in the Hebron district, two in Nablus, one in Tulkarm and six in the Gaza Strip.

14 May

- WHO reports just one confirmed case reported since 8 May.

16 May

- In addition to 5 recoveries reported yesterday Mai Alkaila reported a further 12 recovery cases.

17 May

- Mai Alkaila confirmed that seven of the 17 governorates of Palestine are now free of coronavirus following the recoveries of the last seven active cases in Ramallah.
- Mai Alkaila confirmed five new cases in Hebron bringing total cases for a total 381.

18 May

- Ministry of Health confirmed Ramallah and Al-Bireh, Nablus, Tulkarm, Jenin, Qalqilya, Salfit, Tubas, Jericho, and Bethlehem clear of the pandemic. Palestine reported 560 cases of coronavirus of whom 361 were in the West Bank, 20 in Gaza and 179 in occupied East Jerusalem with a total 453 recoveries.
- Mai Alkaila announced five new cases in Beit Ula, northwest of Hebron for total of 386 cases.

19 May

- Mai Alkaila announced two more cases in Beit Ula for a total of 388 cases. Recent cases in this village amount to 13, all recorded in the last two days.
- A commercial flight from the United Arab Emirates loaded with medical aid meant for the Palestinians, numbering around 16 tons, was refused by Palestine because it didn't want to be a "tool in the normalization" of relations between Israel and the UAE.

20 May

- The Health Ministry announced seven new cases in the Gaza Strip. (Note: There is no RS for 3 cases prior to this but the detail breakdown at corona.ps, shows an increase of 10 cases in Gaza, assumed to be the seven cases reported here plus the three that are missing an RS.)

21 May

- The Government Information Center in the Gaza Strip announced 29 new cases among recent returnees via the Rafah border crossing. Authorities are considering a curfew and all border crossings to individuals will be closed until the end of June. An aid package from the UAE which was rejected by the West Bank will instead be delivered to the Gaza Strip which has had a recent spike in new cases.
- The Ministry of Health confirmed six more cases in the Gaza Strip, bringing the total cases there to 55.

23 May

- The Ministry of Health confirmed the death of a 77-year-old woman at the quarantine hospital at the Rafah border crossing.

25 May

- Mohammad Shtayyeh announced the end of the two-months long lockdown declared in early March. Shtayyeh said that with control over the virus and a sharp decline in active cases currently standing at only 122 in total, most of them in occupied East Jerusalem, and more recently in the Gaza Strip, a decision was made to allow return to normal life, but warned that if the number of cases increase, the lockdown will be re-imposed. Courts, all government ministries and institutions, shops, mosques, churches, public transportation, parks, nurseries, restaurants, coffee shops, events halls and educational institutions will return to normal scheduling starting 26 May 2020.

26 May

- Mai Alkaila announced eight recoveries, six in Hebron and two in Gaza and said that 114 cases are still infected, including 60 in East Jerusalem, 18 in Hebron, and 36 in the southern districts.

27 May

- Mai Alkaila announced five new cases in Beit Ula and three more in Gaza.

28 May

- Mai Alkaila announced a new case from Azzun Atma. As a result, Qalqilya governor declared a total lockdown on the village. Of the total 614 cases recorded since the outbreak of the coronavirus in early March, 374 are in the West Bank, 61 in the Gaza Strip and 179 in occupied East Jerusalem. 365 patients have recovered in the West Bank and Gaza Strip and 118 in East Jerusalem.
- Mai Alkaila announced one more case in Beit Ula.

29 May

- Mai Alkaila, confirmed today 10 new cases in the villages of Azzun Atma and Sanniriya, in Qalqilya Governorate.

30 May

- Mai Alkaila confirmed a further case in Hajja, Qalqilya a continuation of the small outbreak there.

31 May

- Mai Alkaila confirmed an additional case in Hajja.

==== June 2020 ====
Extended content

1 June

- Another new case was confirmed in Hajja according to Minister of Health Mai Alkaila. She said that the new case brings the total recent cases in Qalqilya district to 14, including three in Hajja, 10 in Azzoun and one in Siniria. The ministry is engaged in a track and trace process to try and control the spread there.

2 June

- Mai Alkaila confirmed two more cases in Azzoun, Qalqilya district.

3 June

- Mai Alkaila confirmed five new cases in the Gaza Strip.

4 June

- Mai Alkaila confirmed a new case in Barta'a, Jenin, bringing the total in Palestine to 636, of which 391 are in the West bank and 66 in Gaza.
- Mai Alkaila confirmed a further four new cases raising the total to 640, three further cases in Barta'a and a fourth in Gaza. Out of the 640 cases, 394 are in the West Bank and 67 in the Gaza Strip.
- 3 further cases in Gaza seem to have not been reported but are included in the corona.ps live update figures which show 70 cases there.

8 June

- Mai Alkaila confirmed eight new cases in Haloul near Hebron and a local lockdown of the town was implemented.

9 June

- Mai Alkaila confirmed two new cases in Jericho and Dahriyeh. Of 654 cases in Palestine, 404 are in the West Bank, 70 in the Gaza Strip and 180 in occupied East Jerusalem. 363 have recovered in the West Bank, 41 in the Gaza Strip and 155 in East Jerusalem.
- Mai Alkaila confirmed seven new cases were recorded in Dahriyeh.
- As with the earlier flight in May, Palestine again rejected humanitarian aid from the United Arab Emirates, saying they will not accept medical equipment due to the flight being coordinated directly between Israel and Emirates.

10 June

- Mai Alkaila announced a new case from Jericho and six recoveries, five of them from Beit Ula and the other Kafr Aqab.

11 June

- According to summary reports, four cases in West Bank and Gaza were reported (appears to be 2 in Gaza per corona.ps, one already reported and one other unreported in West Bank).

12 June

- Mai Alkaila confirmed two more cases in the West Bank from al-Krum and Samu'.

13 June

- Mai Alkaila confirmed two cases in the town of al-Samou and a total 673 in Palestine.

15 June

- Mai Alkaila confirmed three more cases in Hebron district.
- Mai Alkaila confirmed a further nine cases in Hebron district and another case earlier in Dar Salah, which was locked down as a result.

16 June

- Mai Alkaila confirmed a new Tulkarm as well as three more cases in Hebron district, two in Dahriyeh and another in Bani Naim.
- Mai Alkaila said that while nine districts were recently declared free from the virus, this number has now decreased to four and that Palestine could face second wave of the pandemic in the event the number of infections continues to rise. Broken down by area, the West Bank has 434 corona cases and two deaths, Gaza 72 cases and one death, and East Jerusalem 184 cases and two deaths and the number of recoveries in the West Bank is 370, Gaza 45, and 155 in East Jerusalem.
- Mai Alkaila confirmed a further five new cases in the West Bank, one in Ramallah four others in Hebron district.

17 June

- Mai Alkaila was said to have confirmed 11 new cases in the West Bank (8 as above and 3 others not separately reported for a total of 700 in Palestine).
- Mai Alkaila confirmed a new case in Ramallah for a total 701 in Palestine. A decision was made to provisionally close the Internal Disease Department, the Dialysis Department and the Emergency Department of the Hebron Government Hospital after it transpired that some patients contracted the virus.
- A further seventeen new cases were discovered in the West Bank this afternoon bringing the total in one day to 35 cases and the overall total in Palestine to 735, said Mai Alkaila. Of the 17, 16 were again in Hebron, bringing the total in this district today to 33 in addition to 2 other cases in Ramallah (one of which was announced earlier).
- Four more cases were found this evening, said Mai Alkaila, three in Hebron district, bringing the total in this district today to 36, and another in Ramallah.

18 June

- Mai Alkaila said that 19 cases were recorded in the Hebron district raising total cases for Palestine to 769. Four cases were recorded earlier in the same district, while one was recorded in Nablus.
- 20 more cases were confirmed this afternoon by Mai Alkaila, 18 being in the Hebron epicenter and 2 more in Nablus.

19 June

- 39 new cases were confirmed by Mai Alkaila for a total 834 in Palestine and 639 in the West Bank and Gaza, 37 of them being in Hebron district and the other 2 in Bethlehem and Nablus. There were 22 recoveries, 11 in Gaza and 11 in Qalqilya.
- Mai Alkaila confirmed this evening a further 24 cases for a Palestine total of 858. 10 were in the Hebron district and 12 in Nablus. 592 patients have recovered and 261 cases remain active, including 170 cases in Hebron, 38 in occupied Jerusalem, 4 in Ramallah, 4 in Bethlehem, 5 in Qalqilia, 18 in Nablus, 4 in Jenin, 2 in Jericho, one in Tulkam, and 15 in the Gaza Strip. Prime Minister Mohammad Shtayyeh said the high emergency and security committees will meet on Saturday to discuss the current situation.
- Mai Alkaila confirmed eight more cases raising total cases today to 73. Five of the cases were in Hebron, and two others in al-Fawwar refugee camp nearby plus a case in Bethlehem.
- Following at least 20 cases in the district in Nablus during the past 24 hours, Governor Ibrahim Ramadan, ordered a multiple sector lockdown and said preventive medicine crews will embark on a track and trace exercise.

20 June

- 33 new cases were confirmed this morning for an overall total in Palestine of 903, according to Minister of Health Mai Alkaila, 32 being in the Hebron district (26 in Hebron proper). There was another case in Nablus.
- Latest results confirmed 51 new cases in the West Bank, 49 of them in the Hebron epicenter and 2 in Nablus for an overall total in Palestine of 954, according to Mai Alkaila.
- Mai Alkaila confirmed this evening a further 24 new cases for an overall total in Palestine of 979 and that 22 were in Hebron epicenter and another 2 in Nablus.
- Mohammad Shtayyeh reinstated strict measures including a five-day lockdown of Hebron Governorate. Movement in and out of Hebron will be barred for five days, cargo trucks excepted, to allow medical teams to control the spread of the disease. Only pharmacies, bakery shops, and factories will be allowed to work and provided that all the health and safety requirements are met. In addition, he ordered a 48-hour complete shutdown of Nablus city to enable the medical teams to trace contacts of every newly diagnosed case of COVID-19. Weddings and graduation parties, mourning houses and all public gatherings in all West Bank governorates are banned. Shtayyeh warned that those who insist on violating the quarantine conditions and putting others at risk of being infected or dying from the virus will be brought to justice for trial, saying "There is no longer any room for tolerance in the matter. The safety procedures are very simple: compliance with COVID-19 social distancing orders, and the use of a facemask in markets, public places, workplace and others. This is a compulsory measure that all citizens have to abide by,". Work in Israeli settlements shall be strictly forbidden during the pandemic, and that stricter measures will be imposed in the event of non-compliance.

21 June

- Mai Alkaila confirmed 43 new cases for a total in Palestine of 1022 with 41 of them in the Hebron area plus one in each of Nablus and Tulkarm. The 43 cases came resulted from 2350 random coronavirus tests done in the previous 24 hours. All isolation and quarantine centers in all governorates were reopened. 270 stranded in Egypt reached Jordan and will be tested on arrival in the West Bank. Ibrahim Milhem said the government has adopted a policy of making a balance between the health and economic needs and only affected villages or towns will be locked down.
- Ministry of Health confirmed six new cases this evening for an overall total in Palestine of 1028, five cases being in Hebron and one in Nablus.

22 June

- Mai Alkaila confirmed 82 new cases for an overall total in Palestine of 1110, being 73 cases in the Hebron-district, 63 of them in the village of Tafouh, four in Bethlehem, two in Ramallah, and three in Nablus.
- Mai Alkaila confirmed another 60 cases in Hebron districtfor an overall total in Palestine of 1170.
- Mai Alkaila confirmed this evening 14 more cases in Hebron district for an overall total in Palestine of 1184.
- Mai Alkaila confirmed 12 new cases for an overall number of cases in Palestine of 1196, being three cases in Hebron, one in nearby Dura and eight in Bethlehem.

23 June

- Mai Alkaila confirmed 88 new cases, raising the total in Palestine to 1284, being 74 in the Hebron district (30 in the city and nearby Dura 31 cases in nearby Dura) 11 cases in East Jerusalem, one in Tulkarm, one in Ramallah and one in Nablus.
- Mai Alkaila confirmed 91 new cases, principally in Hebron and district, for an overall number of cases in Palestine of 1375.

24 June

- Mai Alkaila confirmed today 142 new cases for a total in Palestine of 1,517. 112 of the 142 cases were in Hebron district, 13 cases in Kafr Aqab, 11 in Bethlehem district, three in each of Salfit and Nablus districts.
- Mai Alkaila confirmed 17 new cases for a Palestine total of 1534. 16 of the new cases were in Hebron and one in Tulkarm.

25 June

- Mai Alkaila announced that 23 of 34 new cases were in Hebron, 10 in Bethlehem and 1 in Nablus districts, respectively.
- Mai Alkaila confirmed a further 20 new cases for an overall total in Palestine of 1588. 18 of the 20 cases were in Hebron district and 2 two in Ramallah. There were 4 recoveries (Jenin)

26 June

- Mai Alkaila announced that of 132 new cases, 94 cases were in Hebron district, six in Ramallah and al-Bireh district, two in Jerusalem district, two in Jenin district, two in Jericho district, five in Nablus district, 19 in Bethlehem district and one each in Tulkarem and Salfit districts. 11 of the cases were among Palestinians returning from Egypt.
- Mai Alkaila announced another 43 new cases, 36 in Hebron and 7 in Nablus districts respectively; there were also 32 cases in East Jerusalem for a total in Palestine of 1795. 11 patients in Hebron, Bethlehem and Nablus are in critical condition in intensive care, two being on respirators.

27 June

- Mai Alkaila confirmed 67 new cases for a total in Palestine of 1862. 33 were in Bethlehem governorate, whose governor declared a two-day lockdown, 20 in Hebron district, eight in Nablus district, four in Izzariyeh, and two in Ramallah.
- Mai Alkaila confirmed 191 new cases for a total in Palestine of 2053. 179 of the cases were in Hebron governorate while 10 were in Nablus and two in Jenin. A woman died in Ras al-Amoud.
- Mohammad Shtayyeh ordered stricter safety restrictions given the rise in new cases reported during the past week including reactivation of emergency committees in all villages, cities and refugee camps in Palestine and a full ban on all public gatherings, including weddings, mourning houses, graduation parties. Shtayyeh called on Palestinians with Israeli nationality and who currently live in Israel to refrain from visiting the West Bank for one week.

28 June

- Mai Alkaila confirmed 59 new cases for a total in Palestine of 2112. 34 cases were in Hebron governorate, 10 were in Jerusalem, three in Bethlehem, one in each of Nablus and Ramallah.
- Mai Alkaila confirmed 136 new cases for an overall total in Palestine of 2248. Of the 136 new cases, 109 were in Hebron district, 23 in Nablus, and four in East Jerusalem.

29 June

- Mai Alkaila confirmed 97 new cases and 1 fatality from Hebron district for 2345 total cases in Palestine. 52 cases were reported in Hebron district, 27 in Bethlehem district, five in Nablus district, six in Izzariyeh, two in Ramallah area, and one each in Tulkarm, Qalqilya, Jenin, Salfit, and Jericho.
- Mai Alkaila confirmed a further 98 new cases for an overall total in Palestine of 2,443. Of the 98 new cases, 80 were in Hebron district (41 in Yatta, two in Fawwar refugee camp, three in Dura, 34 in the city), 17 in Nablus (11 in Nablus city, four in Balata refugee camp, one in Duma, one in Sabastia), and one case in At.Tira village in Ramallah.

30 June

- The Ministry of Health confirmed a new overall total cases in Palestine of 2698. It said 181 cases were in Hebron district, including 65 in the city itself, 3 in East Jerusalem, 11 in the district of Nablus, five in Bethlehem area, two in Ramallah, two in Jericho and one in Tulkarm.
- The Ministry of Health confirmed a death from the virus of a 44 years old Palestinian from the Hebron district.
- Mai Alkaila confirmed 67 new cases for an overall total in Palestine of 2,765. No breakdown was given (assum corona.ps breakdown is correct since total matches)

==== July 2020 ====
Extended content

1 July

- Health Ministry spokesman Kamal Shakhra confirmed two deaths from the virus, both from the Hebron district.
- Mai Alkaila confirmed 280 new cases for a total in Palestine of 3,045. 199 cases were recorded in Hebron district, 47 in Bethlehem district, 17 in Nablus district, three in Jericho district, four in Tulkarm and 10 others in Ramallah and al-Bireh district. There were nine recoveries in Adh-Dhahiriyah town, south west of Hebron, while 11 cases remain in serious condition at the intensive care unit, three on respirators.
- Hebron Governor Jibrin al-Bakri will place Hebron district under five-day lockdown with effect from this evening. It will see all prohibition of movement and activities and closure of all institutions and businesses, except for pharmacies and bakeries.
- The Ministry of Health confirmed another 50 cases for an overall total in Palestine of 3095. 49 were in Hebron district and one in Jifna, near Ramallah.

2 July

- Mai Alkaila confirmed 220 new cases for a total in Palestine of 3,315. 199 cases were recorded in Hebron district, ten in Jerusalem district, four in Ramallah and al-Bireh district, four in Nablus district, one in each of Tulkarm, Jenin and Qalqilya.
- Ibrahim Melhem announced that all governorates will be locked down for five days starting Friday, pharmacies, bakeries and supermarkets excluded. Employees will stop going to their workplaces during the lockdown.

3 July

- Mai Alkaila confirmed late on 2 July 102 new cases (82 in Hebron governorate, 10 in Nablus, seven in Bethlehem, two in Qalqilia, and one in Jerusalem governorate) and the Health Ministry today confirmed a further 68 cases (41 in Hebron district, 26 in Bethlehem district and one in Ramallah and al-Bireh district) and one fatality, raising the total number of confirmed cases and the death toll in Palestine to 3,485 and 13 respectively. There were three recoveries in the Gaza Strip.

4 July

- Mai Alkaila confirmed late on 3 July 204 new cases and 2 fatalities and today the Ministry of Health confirmed a further 324 cases as well as another death, for an overall total in Palestine of 4013. The majority of cases were in Hebron district.

5 July

- The Ministry of Health announced late Saturday 237 new cases, 173 in Hebron governorate, 33 in Jerusalem, 28 in Bethlehem, two in Nablus, and one in Ramallah. Mai Alkaila confirmed a further 208 cases, 185 in Hebron governorate, 11 in Bethlehem, 10 in Nablus, and two in Tulkarm. The latest figures bring total confirmed cases in Palestine to 4458. There were 19 recoveries, 18 in Nablus and one in Jenin.
- The Ministry of Health confirmed an additional 264 cases in the evening, 216 in the Hebron district, 44 in the Jerusalem district, three in the Ramallah area and one in Nablus district. Nine patients recovered in the Nablus district.

6 July

- Mai Alkaila confirmed 64 new cases, 34 in Hebron district, 14 in Jerusalem, eight in Bethlehem district, three in Ramallah and al-Bireh district, two in Tulkarm district, two in Jericho district and one in Nablus district. Earlier a new fatality was confirmed.

7 July

- The Ministry of Health confirmed 306 new cases, 278 in the Hebron district, eight in the Jerusalem area, eight in the Bethlehem district, six in Ramallah district, four in Tulkarm and two in Nablus. 23 patients are in intensive care including six on respirators, nine are in Hebron, two in Nablus, seven in Bethlehem, and five in Ramallah. Three patients recovered in Nablus.

8 July

- The Ministry of Health recorded 475 new cases, 316 in Hebron area, 93 in East Jerusalem with the rest in the Ramallah, Bethlehem, Tulkarm, Nablus and Jericho areas. 21 patients are in intensive care, five on respirators. Another fatality in Hebron was recorded.

9 July

- The Ministry of Health recorded 262 new cases, 151 in the Hebron district, 71 in East Jerusalem, eight in Ramallah district, of whom seven were in Jalazone refugee camp, eight in Jericho and the rest in Bethlehem, Nablus and Tulkarm districts. 15 patients are in serious condition in intensive care, three on respirators.31 patients recovered, 26 in Hebron and five in Nablus. The West Bank is in lockdown for a second week in an effort to control the outbreak.

10 July

- The Ministry of Health confirmed a further 3 three fatalities in Hebron district and Mai Alkaila said there were 331 new cases (excluding 65 in occupied Jerusalem), 263 in Hebron, 15 in the Jerusalem governorate, 26 in Ramallah, two in Tulkarm, 18 in Bethlehem, six in Nablus, and one in Qalqilia. 11 recoveries were registered in Bethlehem district.

11 July

- The Ministry of Health confirmed 380 new cases, 328 in Hebron district, of 119 being in the city itself and the rest in surrounding towns and villages. There were 34 cases in Jalazone refugee camp in Ramallah. Two deaths in the town of Yatta and in Aida refugee camp, brought the death toll to 29. Recoveries reached 655 (not as yet fully recorded at corona.ps).

12 July

- The Ministry of Health confirmed 349 new cases and reported six deaths in the last 24 hours, bringing the total to 37. New cases included 166 in Hebron district, 55 in East Jerusalem, 49 in Ramallah, 11 in Bethlehem, seven in Nablus and six in Tulkarm. 408 patients recovered, 399 in Hebron district, six in the Nablus area and three in Gaza. 16 patients are in intensive care, seven on respirators.

13 July

- The Ministry of Health confirmed 243 new cases and 5 deaths, raising the total to 38. 16 patients are in intensive care, six on respirators. 193 cases were in Hebron district, 87 from the city itself, 29 from Bethlehem and nearby towns and villages, as well as 11 from Jericho, among other cities and towns throughout the West Bank. 55 cases were from East Jerusalem. Of the 7335 total cases for Palestine, 6401 were in the West Bank, 72 in the Gaza Strip and 862 in East Jerusalem. Among the dead, 37 were in the West Bank, one in the Gaza Strip and three in East Jerusalem.
- Mai Alkaila confirmed 106 new cases, raising the total confirmed cases in Palestine to 7,441. There were 46 cases in Jerusalem district, 49 others in Ramallah and al-Bireh district, nine in Qalqiliya district, and one in each of Hebron and Nablus districts.

14 July

- The Ministry of Health confirmed 293 new cases, 158 in Hebron district, and 108 in East Jerusalem raising the total cases in Palestine to 7734. 18 patients remain in intensive care, including six on respirators.

15 July

- Data by the Ministry of Health for the last 24 hours showed a sharp surge of 135 new cases in Ramallah district, 48 in the city itself. East Jerusalem also showed a continued high number of new cases with 119 recorded. For the first time in weeks, Hebron showed a sharp decline to 50 cases, half in the city itself. Overall, 419 new cases raised the total in Palestine to 8153. Excluding East Jerusalem, there were 300 new cases. 170 patients recovered in the West Bank, 140 of them in the Hebron district, raising the total of recoveries in Palestine to 1487 (not yet fully recorded at corona.ps). 17 patients are in intensive care, six on respirators.

16 July

- The Ministry of Health confirmed two fatalities and 463 new cases, raising the total in Palestine to 8,616. The total was 7,412 excluding East Jerusalem which recorded 115 new cases, 147 for the governorate, Ramallah city had 15 cases out of 44 for the governorate, Hebron had 40 cases out of 182 for the whole governorate and Bethlehem district 51 cases, others divided among remaining districts.

17 July

- The Health Ministry confirmed 439 new cases and 179 recoveries in the last 24 hours. New cases included 319 in Hebron district, there were 87 in East Jerusalem, five in Ramallah and al-Bireh district, four in Salfit district, four in Jenin district, seven in Nablus district, six in Jericho and the Jordan Valley, two in Qalqiliya district and five in Tubas district. There were 174 recoveries in Hebron district and five in the Gaza Strip. Six Palestinians died in the last 24 hours. 16 patients are in intensive care, five on ventilators. There are altogether 9,055 cases in Palestine, 7,692 in the West Bank, 72 in the Gaza Strip and 1,291 in East Jerusalem.

18 July

- The Health Ministry confirmed 532 new cases in the last 24 hours, raising the total in Palestine to 9587 and three deaths. Of 199 new cases in Hebron governorate, 47 were in Dura and 23 in the city. 96 cases were in East Jerusalem. 104 patients have recovered, including 73 in the Hebron governorate, 29 in Nablus and two in Jenin.

19 July

- The Ministry of Health announced 465 new cases, 312 in the Hebron epicenter, 120 cases in East Jerusalem, eight in Ramallah and al-Bireh, one in Bethlehem, one in Salfit, five in Jenin and three in Nablus. 325 patients have recovered, 315 in the Hebron governorate, five in Bethlehem, three in Tulkarm and two in Nablus. 14 patients are in intensive care, four on respirators.

20 July

- The Ministry of Health confirmed 468 new cases and three deaths. 40 patients are in intensive care units, three on respirators. Apart from two new cases of travellers to Gaza who were in quarantine, there were 135 in the Hebron district and 101 in East Jerusalem.
- The IDF demolished a building under construction to construct the "Covid 19" center in Hebron.

21 July

- The Ministry of Health confirmed 403 new cases and two deaths for a total in Palestine of 10923 (including 1,695 in East Jerusalem). Of the 403 cases, there were 119 in the Hebron district, including 26 in the city and 29 in the town of Idhna, 91 were in East Jerusalem, 49 in the Ramallah district including seven in the city. Nablus city had 19 new cases and Aqabat Jaber refugee camp in Jericho had 23. There were 11 recoveries and 40 patients are in intensive care, four on respirators. With two new fatalities, total deaths have reached 67, 63 in the West Bank, one in the Gaza Strip and three in East Jerusalem.

22 July

- The Health Ministry announced 356 new cases and 16 recoveries. 186 cases were in East Jerusalem, 154 in Hebron district, one in Tulkarm district, eight in Bethlehem district, six in Nablus district and another in Gaza. Of 11,279 cases in total, 9,323 are in the West Bank, 75 in the Gaza Strip and 1,881 in East Jerusalem.

23 July

- The Ministry of Health confirmed 250 new cases in East Jerusalem, 167 in Hebron district, 32 in Ramallah district, 42 in Nablus, 14 in Bethlehem and 10 in Jericho, among others. Three deaths and 1270 recoveries were recorded. 16 patients remain hospitalised, five on respirators.

24 July

- The Health Ministry announced 537 new cases and three fatalities. 287 cases were recorded in Jerusalem district, 106 in Hebron district, 46 in Nablus district, 44 in Jericho district, 27 in Ramallah and al-Bireh district, five in Tulkarem district, 11 in Bethlehem district, one in Jenin district and 10 in Qalqiliya district. There were 235 recoveries. Of 12,412 cases total, 10,093 are in the West Bank, 75 in the Gaza Strip and 2,319 in East Jerusalem.

25 July

- The Ministry of Health confirmed 382 new cases (170 of them in East Jerusalem), one fatality and 627 recoveries. While cases in the Hebron district are down, those in East Jerusalem continue to rise. 15 cases are in intensive care, three on respirators.

26 July

- The Ministry of Health confirmed 330 new cases (167 in East Jerusalem) and 470 recoveries. 40 new cases were in Hebron district, three in Ramallah, eight in Tulkarm, four in Bethlehem, 14 in Jenin, 20 in Nablus, 11 in Jericho and six in Qalqilya. Of the active cases, 12 remain in intensive care and three are on respirators.

27 July

- The Ministry of Health confirmed two fatalities and 333 new cases along with 769 recoveries. The new cases included 180 in East Jerusalem, a new epicenter of the disease, while the Hebron district had only 25 cases. The recovery rate has reached 40.8% after 270 recoveries in the Hebron district and 300 in East Jerusalem. 13 patients are still in intensive care, two on respirators.

28 July

- The Health Ministry announced 481 new cases, 537 recoveries and one fatality including 222 cases in Jerusalem, 180 in Hebron district, 13 in Ramallah and al-Bireh district, 4 in Tulkarem district, 15 in Bethlehem district, 15 in Jenin district, seven in Nablus district, 16 in Jericho district, 6 in Qalqiliya district and 3 in Tubas district.

29 July

- The Health Ministry announced 520 new cases, 74 recoveries and one fatality including 250 in Hebron district, 211 in Jerusalem district (174 in East Jerusalem), 16 in Ramallah and al-Bireh district, 3 in Tulkarem district, 12 in Bethlehem district, 1 in Salfit district, 9 in Jenin district, 7 in Nablus district, 4in Jericho district and 7 in Qalqiliya district.

30 July

- The Ministry of Health confirmed 380 new cases, two deaths and 182 recoveries. Of the new cases, 186 were in the Hebron governorate and 117 were in East Jerusalem.

31 July

- The Ministry of Health confirmed 394 new cases, 62 recoveries and one fatality including 203 cases in Hebron district, 161 cases in Jerusalem district (including 105 in East Jerusalem), 15 in Ramallah and al-Bireh district, two in Qalqiliya district, five in Bethlehem district, three in Jenin district and five in Nablus district. 14 patients were still receiving treatment in intensive care, five connected to ventilators.

==== August 2020 ====
Extended content

1 August

- The Ministry of Health confirmed 323 new cases of COVID-19 and 247 recoveries. 219 cases were in Hebron, 18 in Jerusalem (0 recorded in East Jerusalem), 28 in Ramallah, three in Tulkarm, four in Jenin, five in Nablus, 41 in Jericho, two in Qalqilia, one in Bethlehem, and two in the Gaza Strip.

2 August

- The Ministry of Health confirmed 255 new cases, 66 recoveries and 1 fatality. 103 of the new cases were Jerusalem (88 in East Jerusalem), 28 in Hebron, 49 in Ramallah, two in Tulkarm, one in Jenin, 14 in Nablus, 20 in Jericho, five in Qalqilia, and three in Bethlehem. Seven patients are in intensive care, two on respirators.

3 August

- The Ministry of Health announced 244 new cases and 527 recoveries. 131 of the new cases were in Hebron governorate, 27 in Jerusalem, 14 in Nablus, 14 in Jericho, 10 in Jenin, 42 in Ramallah, two in Qalqilia, and one each in the governorates of Tubas, Tulkarm, and Salfit. Nine patients are currently in intensive care, two on respirators.

4 August

- Mai Alkaila announced 229 new cases (plus 375 new cases in East Jerusalem) and 502 recoveries (plus 236 recoveries in East Jerusalem). 11 patients are still in intensive care, two on ventilators.

5 August

- Mai Alkaila confirmed 353 new cases, 199 recoveries and four fatalities. Of the 353 cases, 158 were recorded in Hebron district, 104 others in Jerusalem district (of which 58 were in East Jerusalem), 20 in Nablus district, 21 in Jericho and the Jordan Valley, four in Bethlehem district, five in Qalqilia district, 14 in Jenin district, 25 in Ramallah and al-Bireh district and two in Tulkarem district. 13 patients are in intensive care, three on respirators.

6 August

- Mai Alkaila confirmed 453 new cases (including 120 in East Jerusalem), 289 recoveries and one death. 183 of the new cases were in the Hebron district, the current epicenter of the disease.

7 August

- Mai Alkaila confirmed 514 new cases, 1126 recoveries and two fatalities including 224 cases in Jerusalem (190 in East Jerusalem) and 209 cases in Hebron.district.

8 August

- Mai Alkaila confirmed six Palestinians have died, four of them in East Jerusalem, and 426 new cases, 220 of them in East Jerusalem; 496 patients have also recovered. The Minister expressed concern at the rise in cases in East Jerusalem. Ten patients remain in intensive care and none are on respirators.

9 August

- Mai Alkaila confirmed 277 new cases and 239 recoveries. 14 patients are in intensive care, three on respirators.

10 August

- Mai Alkaila confirmed seven fatalities and 467 new cases with 545 recoveries. 24 patients are in intensive care, three on respirators.

11 August

- Mai Alkaila confirmed three fatalities, 476 new cases and 345 recoveries. 21 patients are in intensive care, five on respirators.

12 August

- Mai Alkaila confirmed 499 new cases and 346 recoveries. 21 patients remain in intensive care, four on respirators.

13 August

- Mai Alkaila confirmed 432 new cases, 1022 recoveries and one fatality. There were 149 cases in Jerusalem (125 cases in East Jerusalem) and 107 cases in the Hebron district. Among the recoveries, 445 were in the Hebron district and 504 in the Jerusalem district, about 200 in the city itself. 22 patients are currently in intensive care, four on respirators.

14 August

- Mai Alkaila confirmed 531 new cases, 260 recoveries and one fatality. 20 cases are in intensive care, five on respirators.

15 August

- Mai Alkaila confirmed three fatalities, 498 new cases and 112 recoveries. East Jerusalem had 179 cases, followed by Hebron district with 104 cases. 55 patients are in intensive care, five on respirators.

16 August

- Mai Alkaila confirmed 381 new cases, two deaths and 450 recoveries. 26 patients are in intensive care, five on respirators.

17 August

- Mai Alkaila confirmed 456 new cases and 358 recoveries, mainly in Jerusalem. 23 patients remain in intensive care, five on respirators.

18 August

- Mai Alkaila confirmed 612 new cases and 83 recoveries. 24 patients are in intensive care, 7 on respirators.

19 August

- Mai Alkaila confirmed 3 fatalities, 424 new cases and 522 recoveries. Most of the new cases were in the Hebron district along with 200 in the Jerusalem governorate (124 in East Jerusalem). 27 patients are in intensive care, 4 on ventilators.

20 August

- Mai Alkaila confirmed 512 new cases and 409 recoveries. 24 patients are still in intensive care, 4 on respirators.

21 August

- Mai Alkaila confirmed 457 new cases and 540 recoveries. 25 patients remain in intensive care, 6 on respirators.

22 August

- Mai Alkaila confirmed 311 new cases, 68 recoveries and 3 fatalities. Thirty patients are in intensive care, four on ventilators.

23 August

- Mai Alkaila confirmed 326 new cases, 740 recoveries and five fatalities. The MoH was not able to obtain any updates regarding East Jerusalem. The rate of recovery reached 64.3% while 30 patients remain in intensive care, 4 on respirators.

24 August

- Mai Alkaila confirmed 553 new cases, 132 recoveries and 4 fatalities. 28 patients remain in intensive care, 5 on respirators.

25 August

- Mai Alkaila confirmed 585 new cases, 1459 recoveries and 3 fatalities. Gaza recorded four new cases, the first in the general population, prompting a 48-hour lockdown. 28 patients remain critical, five on respirators. A government spokesperson said four cases of the coronavirus were confirmed in a single family in a refugee camp, the first in Gaza that did not involve people quarantined in border facilities after crossing into the coastal enclave from Egypt and Israel.

26 August

- Mai Alkaila confirmed 602 new cases, 825 recoveries and 2 fatalities, including a second death in Gaza. 29 patients are still critical, 4 on respirators.

27 August

- Mai Alkaila confirmed 622 new cases, 325 recoveries and six fatalities. 26 patients are in intensive care, four on respirators.

28 August

- Mai Alkaila confirmed 724 new cases, 164 recoveries and two fatalities. She said the latest figures followed 4115 tests carried out in the West Bank and the Gaza Strip. 48 of the new cases were in the Gaza strip. Both deaths occurred in refugee camps. 40 patients are in intensive care, six on respirators.

29 August

- Mai Alkaila confirmed 417 new cases, 340 recoveries and 4 fatalities. No data was available on East Jerusalem, where cases have exceeded 100 a day in recent weeks. 40 patients are in intensive care, eight on respirators.

30 August

- Mai Alkaila confirmed 536 new cases, 156 recoveries and 2 fatalities. 29 patients are in intensive care, 7 on respirators.

31 August

- Mai Alkaila confirmed 875 new cases, 1031 recoveries and 7 fatalities. Most of the new cases were in East Jerusalem where 350 cases were recorded since Friday, while 249 cases were recorded in the Hebron district, 52 in the Ramallah area, and 99 in the Gaza Strip, which has seen a recent surge in new cases. 31 patients are currently in intensive care, eight on ventilators.

==== September 2020 ====
Extended content

1 September

- Mai Alkaila confirmed 552 new cases, 282 recoveries and 7 fatalities. Hebron governorate remains the area with the highest number of new cases where 203 new cases were recorded- No data was given on the new cases in East Jerusalem, which has been exceeding the 100 mark over the past several weeks. 28 patients remain in intensive care, 6 on ventilators. 62.2 per cent of active cases are concentrated in the Jerusalem and Hebron governorates, including 3400 cases in the Hebron area, 2558 in the Jerusalem governorate, among them 1734 in the city of Jerusalem and 824 in area villages. Total fatalities have reached 180, with 154 in the West Bank, 5 in the Gaza Strip, and 21 in East Jerusalem.

2 September

- Mai Alkaila confirmed 719 new cases, 266 recoveries and fatalities. Among new cases, 233 were recorded in Hebron governorate, 83 in Gaza and 167 in Jerusalem governorate. 28 patients are in intensive care, five on respirators.

3 September

- Mai Alkaila confirmed 596 new cases, 612 recoveries and 5 fatalities. 33 patients are in intensive care, 5 on respirators.

4 September

- Mai Alkaila confirmed 806 new cases, 692 recoveries and 3 fatalities. 31 patients are in intensive care, 5 on respirators.

5 September

- Mai Alkaila confirmed 433 new cases, 224 recoveries and 5 fatalities. 26 patients are in intensive care, 5 on respirators. 110 of the new cases were in the Gaza Strip while the Hebron district showed a low number of 34 despite being the current epicenter.

6 September

- Mai Alkaila confirmed 632 new cases, 341 recoveries and 5 fatalities. 162 new cases were recorded in Gaza.

7 September

- Mai Alkaila confirmed that of 789 new cases, 182 were in the Gaza Strip, the highest number since the outbreak began. 581 patients have recovered, 382 in Hebron district, and there were 3 fatalities. 32 patients are in intensive care, 5 on respirators.

8 September

- Mai Alkaila confirmed that 717 new cases and 718 recoveries. Jerusalem, Hebron, and Gaza had new cases exceeding the 100 mark and she said that there were 10 fatalities in the last 24 hours while 30 patients are in intensive care, 3 on respirators.

9 September

- Mai Alkaila confirmed 696 new cases and 767 recoveries as well as two fatalities. 27 patients are in intensive care, 4 on respirators.

10 September

- Mai Alkaila confirmed 1000 new cases, the highest daily total so far, 490 recoveries and 7 fatalities. 195 cases were in Gaza, 57 in Jerusalem suburbs and 255 in Jerusalem city plus 101 in Hebron district. 31 patients are in intensive care, 10 on respirators. The recovery rate stood at 68.5%. The most problematic issue is reported to be the flouting of social distancing rules at large weddings.

11 September

- Mai Alkaila confirmed 652 new cases and 8 fatalities. 34 patients are in intensive care, 10 on respirators. There were 777 recoveries in Hebron and 241 in East Jerusalem while the recovery rate reached 70.5%.

12 September

- Mai Alkaila confirmed 650 new cases, 191 recoveries and 6 fatalities including 2 in the Gaza strip. 36 patients are in intensive care, 11 on respirators.

13 September

- Mai Alkaila confirmed 811 new cases, 370 recoveries and 12 fatalities. 37 patients are in intensive care, 9 on respirators. Ghassan Nemer, spokesman for the Ministry of Interior, said a return to full lockdown was possible due to a surge in cases, resulting from a lack of adherence to safety protocols but for the time being stricter implementation is being recommended.

14 September

- Mai Alkaila confirmed 788 new cases, 1324 recoveries and 5 fatalities. 35 patients are in intensive care, 8 on respirators.

15 September

- Mai Alkaila confirmed 1118 new cases, 455 recoveries and 6 fatalities. 39 patients are in intensive care, 10 on respirators.

16 September

- Mai Alkaila confirmed 963 new cases, 522 recoveries and 15 fatalities. The recovery rate is at 69.8%. 30 patients are in intensive care, 11 on ventilators.

17 September

- Mai Alkaila confirmed 966 new cases, 959 recoveries and 2 fatalities. 32 patients are in intensive care, 11 on ventilators.

18 September

- Palestine confirmed 692 new cases and 8 fatalities. There were 400 recoveries and the recovery rate stands at 70.3%. 40 cases are in intensive care, seven are on ventilators.

19 September

- Mai Alkaila confirmed 726 new cases, 296 recoveries and five fatalities. 44 patients are in intensive care, ten on ventilators.

20 September

- Mai Alkaila confirmed 683 new cases, 254 recoveries and nine fatalities. 42 patients are in intensive care, nine on ventilators.

21 September

- Mai Alkaila confirmed 611 new cases, 254 recoveries and nine fatalities. 34 patients are in intensive care, eight on ventilators.

22 September

- Mai Alkaila confirmed 557 new cases, 1142 recoveries and five fatalities. 41 patients are in intensive care, eight on ventilators.

23 September

- Mai Alkaila confirmed 503 new cases, 819 recoveries and 3 fatalities. 44 patients are in intensive care, 8 on ventilators.

24 September

- Mai Alkaila confirmed 713 new cases, 920 recoveries and 5 fatalities. 42 patients are in intensive care, 11 on ventilators.

25 September

- Mai Alkaila confirmed 452 new cases, 368 recoveries and 5 fatalities. The recovery rate reached 74%. 43 patients are in intensive care, 12 on ventilators.

26 September

- Mai Alkaila confirmed 290 new cases, 521 recoveries and 7 fatalities. 43 patients are in intensive care, 11 on ventilators.

27 September

- Mai Alkaila confirmed 620 new cases, 1491 recoveries and 9 fatalities. 44 patients are in intensive care, 14 on ventilators.

28 September

- Mai Alkaila confirmed 503 new cases, 1665 recoveries and 10 fatalities. The recovery rate reached 79.3%. 44 patients are in intensive care, 14 on ventilators.

29 September

- Mai Alkaila confirmed 420 new cases, 827 recoveries and 7 fatalities. The recovery rate reached 80.3%. 41 patients are in intensive care, 16 on ventilators.

30 September

- Mai Alkaila confirmed 321 new cases, 571 recoveries and 8 fatalities. The recovery rate reached 81.6%. 39 patients are in intensive care, 14 on ventilators.

==== October 2020 ====
Extended content

1 October

- Mai Alkaila confirmed 521 new cases,881 recoveries and 8 fatalities. The recovery rate reached 82.5%. 32 patients are in intensive care, 15 on ventilators.

2 October

- Mai Alkaila confirmed 545 new cases, 435 recoveries and 3 fatalities. The recovery rate stands at 82.4%. 53 patients are in intensive care, 14 on ventilators.

3 October

- Mai Alkaila confirmed 406 new cases, 563 recoveries and 11 fatalities. The recovery rate stands at 82.9%. 53 patients are in intensive care, 12 on ventilators. The deputy chief of Hamas Saleh al-Arouri tested positive.

4 October

- Mai Alkaila confirmed 420 new cases, 1256 recoveries and 1 fatalities. 51 patients are in intensive care, 13 on ventilators.

5 October

- Mai Alkaila confirmed 491 new cases, 592 recoveries and 11 fatalities. 47 patients are in intensive care, 11 on ventilators.

6 October

- Mai Alkaila confirmed 475 new cases, 417 recoveries and 10 fatalities, excluding figures for East Jerusalem. The recovery rate has reached 84.9%. 46 patients are in intensive care, 11 on ventilators.

7 October

- The Ministry of Health confirmed 510 new cases, 548 recoveries and 6 fatalities, excluding figures for East Jerusalem. The recovery rate has reached 85.1%. 46 patients are in intensive care, 10 on ventilators.

8 October

- Mai Alkaila confirmed 416 new cases, 631 recoveries and 4 fatalities, excluding figures for East Jerusalem. The recovery rate was 85.6%. 45 patients are in intensive care, 10 on ventilators.

9 October

- Mai Alkaila confirmed 498 new cases, 766 recoveries and 9 fatalities. The recovery rate is 86.2%. 44 patients are in intensive care, 10 on ventilators. A top PLO official Saeb Erakat tested positive.

10 October

- Mai Alkaila confirmed 281 new cases, 318 recoveries and 1 fatalities, excluding figures for East Jerusalem. 39 patients are in intensive care, 8 on ventilators.

11 October

- Mai Alkaila confirmed 422 new cases, 772 recoveries and 3 fatalities. The recovery rate is 87.1%. 41 patients are in intensive care, 8 on ventilators.

12 October

- Mai Alkaila confirmed 395 new cases, 312 recoveries and 10 fatalities. 38 patients are in intensive care, 5 on ventilators. She said that only 10 new cases were recorded in East Jerusalem, a significant drop from previous figures and 267 in the West Bank, also a significant decline while there were 118 in the Gaza Strip. A top PLO official Hanan Ashrawi tested positive.

13 October

- Mai Alkaila confirmed 516 new cases, 613 recoveries and 4 fatalities. 41 patients are in intensive care, 7 on ventilators.

14 October

- Mai Alkaila confirmed 532 new cases, 368 recoveries and 4 fatalities. The recovery rate is 87.6%. 40 patients are in intensive care, 7 on ventilators.

15 October

- Mai Alkaila confirmed 442 new cases, 281 recoveries and 8 fatalities excluding figures for East Jerusalem. 36 patients are in intensive care, 6 on ventilators.

16 October

- Mai Alkaila confirmed 397 new cases, 442 recoveries and 1 fatality. The recovery rate is 87.6%. 41 patients are in intensive care, 6 on ventilators.

17 October

- Mai Alkaila confirmed 312 new cases including 86 in Gaza, 241 recoveries including 85 in Gaza and no fatalities. The figures do not include East Jerusalem. The recovery rate is 87.5%. 40 patients are in intensive care, 6 on ventilators.

18 October

- Mai Alkaila confirmed 389 new cases, 336 recoveries and 6 fatalities. The figures do not include East Jerusalem. 40 patients are in intensive care, 6 on ventilators. Saeb Erekat was sent to Hadassah Ein Karem hospital in Jerusalem after his condition worsened.

19 October

- Mai Alkaila confirmed 543 new cases, 572 recoveries and 6 fatalities. The recovery rate is 87.7%. 39 patients are in intensive care, 5 on ventilators.

20 October

- Mai Alkaila confirmed 481 new cases, 513 recoveries and 8 fatalities. The recovery rate is 87.9%. 35 patients are in intensive care, 6 on ventilators.

21 October

- Mai Alkaila confirmed 569 new cases, 562 recoveries and 6 fatalities. The recovery rate is 88%. 34 patients are in intensive care, 5 on ventilators. Saeb Erakat's daughter said on Twitter that he underwent a bronchostomy to examine the condition of his respiratory system.

22 October

- Mai Alkaila confirmed 506 new cases, 124 being in Gaza. 609 recoveries and 8 fatalities, excluding figures for East Jerusalem. 34 patients are in intensive care, 5 on ventilators.

23 October

- Mai Alkaila confirmed 513 new cases, 609 recoveries and 4 fatalities, excluding figures for East Jerusalem. The recovery rate is 88.1%. 33 patients are in intensive care, 5 on ventilators.

24 October

- Mai Alkaila confirmed 410 new cases, including 156 in Gaza, 382 recoveries and 4 fatalities, excluding figures for East Jerusalem. The recovery rate is 88.2%. 36 patients are in intensive care, 8 on ventilators.

25 October

- Mai Alkaila confirmed 453 new cases, including 111 in Gaza, 360 recoveries and 5 fatalities, excluding figures for East Jerusalem. 41 patients are in intensive care, 8 on ventilators.

26 October

- Mai Alkaila confirmed 542 new cases, including 152 in Gaza, 655 recoveries and 6 fatalities. 40 patients are in intensive care, 6 on ventilators.

27 October

- Mai Alkaila confirmed 576 new cases, including 199 in Gaza, 389 recoveries and 4 fatalities, excluding figures for East Jerusalem. 40 patients are in intensive care, 6 on ventilators.

28 October

- Mai Alkaila confirmed 450 new cases, including 100 in Gaza, 612 recoveries and 8 fatalities. 40 patients are in intensive care, 6 on ventilators.

29 October

- Mai Alkaila confirmed 623 new cases, including 276 in Gaza, and 8 fatalities. The recovery rate is 88.4%. 39 patients are in intensive care, 6 on ventilators.

30 October

- Mai Alkaila confirmed 504 new cases, including 178 in Gaza, and 8 fatalities. The recovery rate remained at 88.4%. 39 patients are in intensive care, 6 on ventilators.

31 October

- Mai Alkaila confirmed 521 new cases, including 198 in Gaza, 445 recoveries and 2 fatalities. The recovery rate remained at 88.4%. 39 patients are in intensive care, 9 on ventilators.

==== November 2020 ====
Extended content

1 November

- Mai Alkaila confirmed 540 new cases, including 185 in Gaza, 464 recoveries and 6 fatalities. The recovery rate remained at 88.4%. 35 patients are in intensive care, 8 on ventilators.

2 November

- Mai Alkaila confirmed 749 new cases, including a record daily 272 in Gaza, 438 recoveries and 4 fatalities. The recovery rate is 88%. 37 patients are in intensive care, 8 on ventilators.

3 November

- Mai Alkaila confirmed 633 new cases, including 229 in Gaza, 575 recoveries and 8 fatalities. The recovery rate is 88%. 35 patients are in intensive care, 7 on ventilators.

4 November

- Mai Alkaila confirmed 734 new cases, including 281 in Gaza, 526 recoveries and 3 fatalities. The recovery rate is 87.87%. 36 patients are in intensive care, 8 on ventilators.

5 November

- Mai Alkaila confirmed 582 new cases, including 248 in Gaza, 456 recoveries and 4 fatalities, excluding figures for East Jerusalem. The recovery rate is 87.79%. 40 patients are in intensive care, 9 on ventilators.

6 November

- Mai Alkaila confirmed 681 new cases, including 259 in Gaza, 895 recoveries and 3 fatalities. The recovery rate is 88.22%. 35 patients are in intensive care, 7 on ventilators.

7 November

- Mai Alkaila confirmed 431 new cases, including 250 in Gaza, 438 recoveries and 1 fatality. The recovery rate is 88.3%. 34 patients are in intensive care, 7 on ventilators.

8 November

- Mai Alkaila confirmed 549 new cases, including 201 in Gaza, 444 recoveries and 3 fatalities. The recovery rate is 88.3%. 40 patients are in intensive care, 10 on ventilators.

9 November

- Mai Alkaila confirmed 680 new cases, including 270 in Gaza, 470 recoveries and 6 fatalities, excluding figures for East Jerusalem. 41 patients are in intensive care, 10 on ventilators.

10 November

- Mai Alkaila confirmed 660 new cases, including 191 in Gaza, 588 recoveries and 14 fatalities. The recovery rate was 88.1%. 41 patients are in intensive care, 10 on ventilators.
- Long time Palestinian peace negotiator Saeb Erakat died. He had a lung transplant in 2017 and had had poor health since. On 8 October 2020, he announced he had COVID-19 and his condition deteriorated. He was 65 years of age.

11 November

- Mai Alkaila confirmed 643 new cases, including 300 in Gaza, 801 recoveries and 5 fatalities, not including figures for East Jerusalem. 40 patients are in intensive care, 11 on ventilators.

12 November

- Mai Alkaila confirmed 823 new cases, including 311 in Gaza, 657 recoveries and 5 fatalities. The recovery rate is 88.3%. 40 patients are in intensive care, 11 on ventilators.
- The Palestinian Health Ministry in Gaza has called on the WHO to urgently send testing kits given the number of new cases. The intensive care unit in Al-Aqsa Hospital is suffering a severe lack of medical equipment and oxygen is in short supply.

13 November

- Mai Alkaila confirmed 730 new cases, including 274 in Gaza, 506 recoveries and 6 fatalities. The recovery rate is 88.1%. 40 patients are in intensive care, 10 on ventilators.

14 November

- Mai Alkaila confirmed 653 new cases, including 310 in Gaza, 424 recoveries and 10 fatalities, excluding figures for East Jerusalem. The recovery rate is 87.9%. 40 patients are in intensive care, 9 on ventilators.

15 November

- Mai Alkaila confirmed 976 new cases, including 406 in Gaza, 585 recoveries and 7 fatalities. The recovery rate is 87.5%. 39 patients are in intensive care, 10 on ventilators.

16 November

- Mai Alkaila confirmed 836 new cases, including a record 406 in Gaza, 607 recoveries and 7 fatalities, excluding figures for East Jerusalem. The recovery rate is 87.3%. 44 patients are in intensive care, 8 on ventilators.

17 November

- Mai Alkaila confirmed 1158 new cases, including a record 486 in Gaza, 774 recoveries and 11 fatalities. The recovery rate is 87.1%. 44 patients are in intensive care, 9 on ventilators.

18 November

- Mai Alkaila confirmed 1251 new cases, including 600 in Gaza, and 9 fatalities, excluding figures for East Jerusalem. The recovery rate is 87.2%. 43 patients are in intensive care, 10 on ventilators.

19 November

- Mai Alkaila confirmed 1251 new cases, including 368 in Gaza as well as a record 238 in Nablus, 912 recoveries and 9 fatalities.45 patients are in intensive care, 10 on ventilators.

20 November

- Mai Alkaila confirmed 1472 new cases, including 754 in Gaza, 410 recoveries and 8 fatalities, excluding figures for East Jerusalem. The recovery rate is 85.87%. 45 patients are in intensive care, 10 on ventilators.

21 November

- Mai Alkaila confirmed 1486 new cases, including 891 in Gaza as well as a record 212 in Nablus, 504 recoveries and 14 fatalities, excluding figures for East Jerusalem. The recovery rate is 84.94%. 51 patients are in intensive care, 9 on ventilators.
- Fathi Abu Warda, advisor to the Palestinian Minister of Health in Gaza, said there is a surge in cases and the European Hospital in Khan Younis has reached capacity. Two truckloads of urgent medical aid are expected including respirators and special medicines. Palestinian health officials stated that Gaza was 10 days away from having its health system being overwhelmed by COVID-19.

22 November

- Mai Alkaila confirmed 1560 new cases, including 684 in Gaza, 748 recoveries and 16 fatalities. 55 patients are in intensive care, 10 on ventilators.

23 November

- Mai Alkaila confirmed 1558 new cases, including 689 in Gaza, 517 recoveries and 9 fatalities, excluding figures for East Jerusalem. 52 patients are in intensive care, 9 on ventilators.
- In a bid to control the rapid rise in cases, the Palestinian government decided to impose a lockdown on Fridays and Saturdays and from 7 in the evening to 6 in the morning for 14 days.

24 November

- Mai Alkaila confirmed a record 1946 new cases, including 685 in Gaza, 555 recoveries and 17 fatalities. The recovery rate is 82.2%. 54 patients are in intensive care, 9 on ventilators.

25 November

- Mai Alkaila confirmed 1720 new cases, including 613 in Gaza, 490 recoveries and 9 fatalities, excluding figures for East Jerusalem. The recovery rate is 81.1%. 55 patients are in intensive care, 8 on ventilators.

26 November

- Mai Alkaila confirmed a record 1906 new cases, including 656 in Gaza, 812 recoveries and 18 fatalities. The recovery rate is about 80%. 57 patients are in intensive care, 8 on ventilators.

27 November

- Mai Alkaila confirmed a record 1936 new cases (including 922 in Gaza where total cases have reached 18333), 719 recoveries and 8 fatalities. The recovery rate is 79.4%. 57 patients are in intensive care, 8 on ventilators.
- Israeli soldiers stormed the Hugo Chávez Hospital (a special hospital to treat patients with COVID-19) during an arrest campaign in the area.

28 November

- Mai Alkaila confirmed 1461 new cases, including 827 in Gaza, 984 recoveries and 15 fatalities. 63 patients are in intensive care, 10 on ventilators.

29 November

- Mai Alkaila confirmed 1927 new cases, including 738 in Gaza, 957 recoveries and 16 fatalities. The recovery rate is 78.7%. 67 patients are in intensive care, 12 on ventilators.
- Funded by Kuwait, the World Health Organization delivered 15 ventilators to Gaza hospitals to help with the current rise in cases. Gaza maintains that there are continuing severe shortages, including oxygen supplies.

30 November

- Mai Alkaila confirmed 2062 new cases, including 748 in Gaza, 1153 recoveries and 15 fatalities, excluding figures for East Jerusalem. 66 patients are in intensive care, 12 on ventilators.
- The European Union provided an additional contribution of €9.27 million to support the Palestinian Authority with medical referrals to East Jerusalem Hospitals.

==== December 2020 ====
Extended content

1 December

- Mai Alkaila confirmed a record 2536 new cases, including 815 in Gaza, 1032 recoveries and 16 fatalities. 64 patients are in intensive care, 13 on ventilators. The recovery rate is 77.3%.

2 December

- Mai Alkaila confirmed 2188 new cases, including 735 in Gaza, 1051 recoveries and 16 fatalities, excluding figures for East Jerusalem. The recovery rate is 76.6%, 67 patients are in intensive care, 14 on ventilators.

3 December

- Mai Alkaila confirmed a record 2738 new cases, including 827 in Gaza, 1469 recoveries and 19 fatalities. The recovery rate is 76.1%, 74 patients are in intensive care, 17 on ventilators.

4 December

- Mai Alkaila confirmed a record 1968 new cases, including 788 in Gaza, 1956 recoveries and 17 fatalities, excluding figures for East Jerusalem. The recovery rate is 76.1%, 71 patients are in intensive care, 20 on ventilators. The recovery rate is 76.5%.

5 December

- Mai Alkaila confirmed 1422 new cases, including 584 in Gaza, 1030 recoveries and 15 fatalities, excluding figures for East Jerusalem. The recovery rate is 76.4%, 69 patients are in intensive care, 20 on ventilators.

6 December

- Mai Alkaila confirmed 2333 new cases, including 726 in Gaza, 1758 recoveries and 17 fatalities. The recovery rate is 76.4%, 69 patients are in intensive care, 18 on ventilators.

7 December

- Mai Alkaila confirmed 1720 new cases, including 471 in Gaza, 1280 recoveries and 20 fatalities (10 in Gaza), excluding figures for East Jerusalem. 76 patients are in intensive care, 18 on ventilators.
- Fathi Abu Warda, an advisor to the Minister of Health, said that testing kits have run out and is hopeful that 5000 swabs supposed to reach Gaza from WHO, will arrive in Gaza in the coming hours. Due to this, the central laboratory in Gaza stopped testing after 1245 tests yesterday.

8 December

- Mai Alkaila confirmed 1595 new cases (0 in Gaza due to having no testing kits available), 1429 recoveries and 19 fatalities. The recovery rate is 76.6%. 85 patients are in intensive care, 25 on ventilators.

9 December

- Mai Alkaila confirmed 1883 new cases (639 in Gaza), 1636 recoveries and 23 fatalities, excluding figures for East Jerusalem. 84 patients are in intensive care, 25 on ventilators.

10 December

- Mai Alkaila confirmed 2181 new cases (586 in Gaza), 1953 recoveries and 24 fatalities. The recovery rate is 77%. 81 patients are in intensive care, 24 on ventilators.
- Fathi Abu Warda, an advisor to Minister of Health Mai Alkaila said that all hospital beds are occupied and expressed concern about the effect on Gaza's health sector due to the surge in cases. He said that 20 per cent of cases are in serious condition, most with pneumonia.

11 December

- Mai Alkaila confirmed 1743 new cases (617 in Gaza), 2451 recoveries and 21 fatalities. The recovery rate is 77.9%. 81 patients are in intensive care, 23 on ventilators

12 December

- Mai Alkaila confirmed 1845 new cases (505 in Gaza), 2182 recoveries and 33 fatalities. The recovery rate is 77%. 83 patients are in intensive care, 26 on ventilators.
- Osama Najjar, an official with the Palestinian Ministry of Health said that four million doses of the Russian COVID-19 vaccine are expected in Palestine shortly. Minister of Health Mai Alkaila confirmed that Palestine is in touch with Russia, Moderna and AstraZeneca companies but not Pfizer since Palestine has only one suitable refrigerator and no means to transport the vaccine. The COVEX Facility will cover costs of the vaccine for 20 per cent of the population.

13 December

- Mai Alkaila confirmed 1639 new cases (406 in Gaza), 1987 recoveries and 17 fatalities, excluding figures for East Jerusalem. 93 patients are in intensive care, 30 on ventilators

14 December

- Mai Alkaila confirmed 1564 new cases (157 in Gaza), 2145 recoveries and 28 fatalities. 95 patients are in intensive care, 30 on ventilators

15 December

- Mai Alkaila confirmed 2307 new cases (709 in Gaza), 1910 recoveries and 23 fatalities, excluding figures for East Jerusalem. 135 patients are in intensive care, 39 on ventilators. The recovery rate is 79.8%.

16 December

- Mai Alkaila confirmed 2525 new cases (935 in Gaza), 2240 recoveries and 26 fatalities. 137 patients are in intensive care, 39 on ventilators.
- There is an upward trend in cases in several governorates. Head of the Jenin Health Directorate Wisam Sbeihat said cases in Jenin were over 7,000, 1700 active, and 87 fatalities. Jenin Hospital is full and intensive case occupancy is 95%.Head of Tubas Health Directorate Jamil Daraghmeh said cases have reached 1,600, 600 active and Salfit Health Director Haitham Mansour also confirmed 2,400 cases, 550 active and 15 fatalities.

17 December

- Mai Alkaila confirmed 2149 new cases (1015 in Gaza), 2027 recoveries and 30 fatalities, excluding figures for East Jerusalem. 132 patients are in intensive care, 36 on ventilators.

18 December

- Mai Alkaila confirmed 2170 new cases (997 in Gaza), 1791 recoveries and 21 fatalities. The recovery rate is 80.2%. 131 patients are in intensive care, 34 on ventilators.

19 December

- Mai Alkaila confirmed 1750 new cases (876 in Gaza), 2019 recoveries and 25 fatalities. 128 patients are in intensive care, 35 on ventilators.

20 December

- Mai Alkaila confirmed 1427 new cases (560 in Gaza), 1518 recoveries and 24 fatalities, excluding figures for East Jerusalem. 133 patients are in intensive care, 35 on ventilators.

21 December

- Mai Alkaila confirmed 1514 new cases (280 in Gaza), 1848 recoveries and 31 fatalities. 138 patients are in intensive care, 37 on ventilators.

22 December

- Mai Alkaila confirmed 1561 new cases (516 in Gaza), 1808 recoveries and 29 fatalities, excluding figures for East Jerusalem. The recovery rate is 81.8%. 124 patients are in intensive care, 33 on ventilators.

23 December

- Mai Alkaila confirmed 2110 new cases (867 in Gaza), 1823 recoveries and 31 fatalities. The recovery rate is 81.9%. 119 patients are in intensive care, 29 on ventilators.

24 December

- Mai Alkaila confirmed 1704 new cases (806 in Gaza), 2291 recoveries and 17 fatalities, excluding figures for East Jerusalem. The recovery rate is 82.5%. 122 patients are in intensive care, 29 on ventilators.

25 December

- Mai Alkaila confirmed 1812 new cases (728 in Gaza), 1783 recoveries and 21 fatalities. The recovery rate is 82.7%. 118 patients are in intensive care, 26 on ventilators.

26 December

- Mai Alkaila confirmed 1306 new cases (792 in Gaza), 1400 recoveries and 21 fatalities (12 in Gaza), excluding figures for East Jerusalem. 121 patients are in intensive care, 30 on ventilators.

27 December

- Mai Alkaila confirmed 1506 new cases (544 in Gaza), 1493 recoveries and 28 fatalities. 112 patients are in intensive care, 27 on ventilators.

28 December

- Mai Alkaila confirmed 1363 new cases (477 in Gaza), 1638 recoveries and 26 fatalities. The recovery rate is 83.4%. 123 patients are in intensive care, 29 on ventilators.

29 December

- Mai Alkaila confirmed 1149 new cases (542 in Gaza), 2155 recoveries and 19 fatalities, excluding figures for East Jerusalem. 127 patients are in intensive care, 30 on ventilators.

30 December

- Mai Alkaila confirmed 1539 new cases (711 in Gaza), 2315 recoveries and 21 fatalities. 113 patients are in intensive care, 27 on ventilators.

31 December

- Mai Alkaila confirmed 1268 new cases (708 in Gaza), 2056 recoveries and 29 fatalities, excluding figures for East Jerusalem. The recovery rate is 85.5%. 118 patients are in intensive care, 28 on ventilators.

=== January to October 2021 ===
Extended content

==== January 2021 ====
Extended content

1 January

- Mai Alkaila confirmed 1450 new cases (689 in Gaza), 2088 recoveries and 18 fatalities. The recovery rate is 86%. 116 patients are in intensive care, 25 on ventilators.

2 January

- Mai Alkaila confirmed 1064 new cases (704 in Gaza), 1477 recoveries and 25 fatalities, excluding figures for East Jerusalem. The recovery rate is 86.4%. 119 patients are in intensive care, 27 on ventilators.

3 January

- Mai Alkaila confirmed 1155 new cases (409 in Gaza), 1419 recoveries and 31 fatalities. The recovery rate is 86.7%. 124 patients are in intensive care, 26 on ventilators.

4 January

- Mai Alkaila confirmed 1009 new cases (361 in Gaza), 1413 recoveries and 20 fatalities, excluding figures for East Jerusalem. The recovery rate is 87%. 113 patients are in intensive care, 23 on ventilators.

5 January

- Mai Alkaila confirmed 1191 new cases (396 in Gaza), 1804 recoveries and 20 fatalities. The recovery rate is 87.5%. 113 patients are in intensive care, 27 on ventilators.

6 January

- Mai Alkaila confirmed 1088 new cases (535 in Gaza), 1585 recoveries and 14 fatalities. The recovery rate is 87.9%. 115 patients are in intensive care, 27 on ventilators.

7 January

- Mai Alkaila confirmed 1251 new cases (610 in Gaza), 1592 recoveries and 21 fatalities, excluding figures for East Jerusalem. The recovery rate is 88.2%. 107 patients are in intensive care, 23 on ventilators.

8 January

- Mai Alkaila confirmed 822 new cases (499 in Gaza), 1405 recoveries and 23 fatalities, excluding figures for East Jerusalem. The recovery rate is 88.6%. 105 patients are in intensive care, 25 on ventilators.

9 January

- Mai Alkaila confirmed 855 new cases (347 in Gaza), 1422 recoveries and 26 fatalities. Since March 2020, cases in the West Bank reached the 100,000 mark, Gaza 45,000 and East Jerusalem 18,500 while fatalities reached respectively, 1100, 400 and 150. The recovery rate is 89%. 100 patients are in intensive care, 23 on ventilators.

10 January

- Mai Alkaila confirmed 699 new cases (232 in Gaza), 1015 recoveries and 20 fatalities, excluding figures for East Jerusalem. The recovery rate is 89.2%. 98 patients are in intensive care, 22 on ventilators.

11 January

- Mai Alkaila confirmed 928 new cases (317 in Gaza), 1355 recoveries and 12 fatalities. 95 patients are in intensive care, 21 on ventilators.

12 January

- Mai Alkaila confirmed 797 new cases (413 in Gaza), 1441 recoveries and 15 fatalities, excluding figures for East Jerusalem. The recovery rate is 90%. 92 patients are in intensive care, 24 on ventilators.

13 January

- Mai Alkaila confirmed 978 new cases (437 in Gaza), 1670 recoveries and 30 fatalities. The recovery rate is 90.4%. 93 patients are in intensive care, 25 on ventilators.

14 January

- Mai Alkaila confirmed 736 new cases (368 in Gaza), 1270 recoveries and 7 fatalities, excluding figures for East Jerusalem. 91 patients are in intensive care, 28 on ventilators.

15 January

- Mai Alkaila confirmed 822 new cases (403 in Gaza), 1646 recoveries and 27 fatalities. The recovery is at 91.3%. 87 patients are in intensive care, 20 on ventilators.

16 January

- Mai Alkaila confirmed 427 new cases (284 in Gaza), 847 recoveries and 13 fatalities, excluding figures for East Jerusalem. 87 patients are in intensive care, 21 on ventilators.

17 January

- Mai Alkaila confirmed 578 new cases (212 in Gaza), 862 recoveries and 20 fatalities. The recovery rate is 91.8%. 84 patients are in intensive care, 21 on ventilators.

18 January

- Mai Alkaila confirmed 524 new cases (237 in Gaza), 944 recoveries and 8 fatalities, excluding figures for East Jerusalem. The recovery rate is 92%. 81 patients are in intensive care, 22 on ventilators.

19 January

- Mai Alkaila confirmed 660 new cases (313 in Gaza), 1027 recoveries and 19 fatalities. The recovery rate is 92.3%. 81 patients are in intensive care, 22 on ventilators.

20 January

- Mai Alkaila confirmed 497 new cases (285 in Gaza), 1090 recoveries and 10 fatalities. The recovery rate is 92.7%. 80 patients are in intensive care, 22 on ventilators.

21 January

- Mai Alkaila confirmed 574 new cases (286 in Gaza), 972 recoveries and 7 fatalities. The recovery rate is 92.9%. 78 patients are in intensive care, 21 on ventilators.

22 January

- Mai Alkaila confirmed 494 new cases (275 in Gaza), 792 recoveries and 12 fatalities, excluding figures for East Jerusalem. The recovery rate is 93.1%. 77 patients are in intensive care, 22 on ventilators.

23 January

- Mai Alkaila confirmed 467 new cases (286 in Gaza), 686 recoveries and 14 fatalities, excluding figures for East Jerusalem. The recovery rate is 93.3%. 73 patients are in intensive care, 19 on ventilators.

24 January

- Mai Alkaila confirmed 533 new cases (189 in Gaza), 740 recoveries and 14 fatalities. The recovery rate is 93.4%. 71 patients are in intensive care, 18 on ventilators.

25 January

- Mai Alkaila confirmed 470 new cases (190 in Gaza), 729 recoveries and 5 fatalities. The recovery rate is 93.6%. 61 patients are in intensive care, 12 on ventilators.

26 January

- Mai Alkaila confirmed 660 new cases (214 in Gaza), 913 recoveries and 10 fatalities. The recovery rate is 93.7%. 66 patients are in intensive care, 16 on ventilators.

27 January

- Mai Alkaila confirmed 608 new cases (327 in Gaza), 655 recoveries and 5 fatalities. The recovery rate is 93.8%. 61 patients are in intensive care, 18 on ventilators.

28 January

- Mai Alkaila confirmed 747 new cases (364 in Gaza), 764 recoveries and 8 fatalities. The recovery rate is 93.8%. 64 patients are in intensive care, 18 on ventilators.

29 January

- Mai Alkaila confirmed 575 new cases (357 in Gaza), 520 recoveries and 11 fatalities. The recovery rate is 93.8%. 64 patients are in intensive care, 20 on ventilators.

30 January

- Mai Alkaila confirmed 515 new cases (191 in Gaza), 550 recoveries and 9 fatalities. The recovery rate is 93.9%. 58 patients are in intensive care, 20 on ventilators.

31 January

- Mai Alkaila confirmed 403 new cases (125 in Gaza), 410 recoveries and 2 fatalities, excluding figures for East Jerusalem. The recovery rate is 93.9%. 57 patients are in intensive care, 19 on ventilators.

==== February 2021 ====
Extended content

1 February

- Mai Alkaila confirmed 586 new cases (215 in Gaza), 768 recoveries and 11 fatalities. The recovery rate is 94%. 54 patients are in intensive care, 17 on ventilators.

2 February

- Mai Alkaila confirmed 513 new cases (143 in Gaza), 502 recoveries and 9 fatalities, excluding figures for East Jerusalem. 54 patients are in intensive care, 16 on ventilators.
- The Ministry of Health announced the receipt of 2000 doses of the Moderna vaccine from Israel, prioritised for health workers. Mai Alkaila received the vaccine at the Hugo Chaves Hospital along with medical staff working in the intensive care units. She said that 5000 doses of the Sputnik vaccine will arrive within days as well as 37,000 doses from the COVAX initiative.

3 February

- Mai Alkaila confirmed 670 new cases (178 in Gaza), 739 recoveries and 10 fatalities. 53 patients are in intensive care, 21 on ventilators.

4 February

- Mai Alkaila confirmed 661 new cases (200 in Gaza), 419 recoveries and 8 fatalities, excluding figures for East Jerusalem. The recovery rate is 94%. 55 patients are in intensive care, 20 on ventilators.
- 10,000 doses of the Sputnik V vaccine were received on 4 February 2021 and 50,000 more doses are expected during the next week.

5 February

- Mai Alkaila confirmed 722 new cases (179 in Gaza), 813 recoveries and 5 fatalities. The recovery rate is 94%. 61 patients are in intensive care, 17 on ventilators.

6 February

- Mai Alkaila confirmed 298 new cases (172 in Gaza), 245 recoveries and 3 fatalities, excluding figures for East Jerusalem. The recovery rate is 94%. 63 patients are in intensive care, 15 on ventilators.

7 February

- Mai Alkaila confirmed 824 new cases (172 in Gaza), 528 recoveries and 14 fatalities. The recovery rate is 93.9%. 64 patients are in intensive care, 14 on ventilators.

8 February

- Mai Alkaila confirmed 612 new cases (56 in Gaza), 440 recoveries and 7 fatalities, excluding figures for East Jerusalem. The recovery rate is 93.8%. 56 patients are in intensive care, 16 on ventilators.

9 February

- Mai Alkaila confirmed 1022 new cases (148 in Gaza), 419 recoveries and 9 fatalities. 58 patients are in intensive care, 17 on ventilators.

10 February

- Mai Alkaila confirmed 761 new cases (199 in Gaza), 578 recoveries and 12 fatalities, excluding figures for East Jerusalem. 60 patients are in intensive care, 17 on ventilators.

11 February

- Mai Alkaila confirmed 1101 new cases (202 in Gaza), 652 recoveries and 2 fatalities. 57 patients are in intensive care, 18 on ventilators.

12 February

- Mai Alkaila confirmed 665 new cases (117 in Gaza), 635 recoveries and 8 fatalities. The recovery rate is 93.5%. 56 patients are in intensive care, 19 on ventilators.

13 February

- Mai Alkaila confirmed 938 new cases (175 in Gaza), 779 recoveries and 15 fatalities. 62 patients are in intensive care, 22 on ventilators.

14 February

- Mai Alkaila confirmed 804 new cases (74 in Gaza), 522 recoveries and 3 fatalities, excluding figures for East Jerusalem. The revovery rate is 93.3%. 60 patients are in intensive care, 21 on ventilators.

15 February

- Mai Alkaila confirmed 1048 new cases (79 in Gaza), 915 recoveries and 5 fatalities. 63 patients are in intensive care, 23 on ventilators.

16 February

- Mai Alkaila confirmed 1043 new cases (125 in Gaza), 777 recoveries and 6 fatalities. The recovery rate is 93.2%. 67 patients are in intensive care, 27 on ventilators.

17 February

- Mai Alkaila confirmed 1432 new cases (153 in Gaza), 960 recoveries and 8 fatalities. The recovery rate is 93.0%. 67 patients are in intensive care, 24 on ventilators.

18 February

- Mai Alkaila confirmed 627 new cases (171 in Gaza), 660 recoveries and 8 fatalities, excluding figures for East Jerusalem. 69 patients are in intensive care, 25 on ventilators.

19 February

- Mai Alkaila confirmed 859 new cases (139 in Gaza), 1025 recoveries and 7 fatalities. The recovery rate is 93.1%. 75 patients are in intensive care, 25 on ventilators.

20 February

- Mai Alkaila confirmed 599 new cases (90 in Gaza), 591 recoveries and 10 fatalities, excluding figures for East Jerusalem. 72 patients are in intensive care, 24 on ventilators.

21 February

- Mai Alkaila confirmed 1564 new cases (150 in Gaza), 988 recoveries and 8 fatalities. The recovery rate is 92.9%. 81 patients are in intensive care, 24 on ventilators.

22 February

- Mai Alkaila confirmed 1272 new cases (62 in Gaza), 615 recoveries and 8 fatalities, excluding figures for East Jerusalem. The recovery rate is 92.6%. 85 patients are in intensive care, 21 on ventilators. Mass inoculations have yet to begin due to delay in arrival of the vaccines.

23 February

- Mai Alkaila confirmed 1996 new cases (175 in Gaza), 1120 recoveries and 10 fatalities. The recovery rate is 92.2%. 92 patients are in intensive care, 26 on ventilators.

24 February

- Mai Alkaila confirmed 1391 new cases (84 in Gaza), 1038 recoveries and 5 fatalities. The recovery rate is 92.1%. 93 patients are in intensive care, 23 on ventilators.

25 February

- Mai Alkaila confirmed 2100 new cases (92 in Gaza), 1096 recoveries and 11 fatalities. The recovery rate is 91.7%. 101 patients are in intensive care, 26 on ventilators.

26 February

- Mai Alkaila confirmed 1555 new cases (128 in Gaza), 648 recoveries and 11 fatalities. The recovery rate is 91.3%. 100 patients are in intensive care, 33 on ventilators.
- Mai Alkaila has suggested a comprehensive closure as positive cases have increased by some 20-30 per cent and hospital beds are in short supply. She said "This is the third wave of the coronavirus outbreak in Palestine...and it is the most difficult period we have experienced since the beginning of the pandemic."

27 February

- Mai Alkaila confirmed 1623 new cases (151 in Gaza), 1081 recoveries and 9 fatalities. The recovery rate is 91.2%. 110 patients are in intensive care, 33 on ventilators.

28 February

- Mai Alkaila confirmed 1911 new cases (88 in Gaza), 956 recoveries and 23 fatalities. The recovery rate is 90.8%. 117 patients are in intensive care, 26 on ventilators.

==== March 2021 ====
Extended content

1 March

- Mai Alkaila confirmed 1626 new cases (98 in Gaza), 808 recoveries and 14 fatalities, excluding figures for East Jerusalem. The recovery rate is 90.4%. 116 patients are in intensive care, 29 on ventilators.

2 March

- Mai Alkaila confirmed 2412 new cases (154 in Gaza), 1316 recoveries and 6 fatalities. 114 patients are in intensive care, 28 on ventilators.

3 March

- Mai Alkaila confirmed 2017 new cases (196 in Gaza), 1152 recoveries and 15 fatalities. The recovery rate is 89.7%. 119 patients are in intensive care, 26 on ventilators.

4 March

- Mai Alkaila confirmed 2300 new cases (156 in Gaza), 1694 recoveries and 18 fatalities. The recovery rate is 89.5%. 135 patients are in intensive care, 32 on ventilators.

5 March

- Mai Alkaila confirmed 1826 new cases (146 in Gaza), 1270 recoveries and 19 fatalities. The recovery rate is 89.4%. 150 patients are in intensive care, 37 on ventilators.

6 March

- Mai Alkaila confirmed 2011 new cases (135 in Gaza), 1430 recoveries and 19 fatalities. 146 patients are in intensive care, 38 on ventilators.

7 March

- Mai Alkaila confirmed 22264 new cases (169 in Gaza), 1446 recoveries and 13 fatalities, excluding figures for East Jerusalem. The recovery rate is 88.9%. 146 patients are in intensive care, 40 on ventilators.

8 March

- Mai Alkaila confirmed 2003 new cases (123 in Gaza), 1909 recoveries and 22 fatalities. 150 patients are in intensive care, 42 on ventilators.

9 March

- Mai Alkaila confirmed 1828 new cases (135 in Gaza), 1614 recoveries and 13 fatalities. 155 patients are in intensive care, 39 on ventilators.

10 March

- Mai Alkaila confirmed 2331 new cases (168 in Gaza), 2273 recoveries and 27 fatalities. The recovery rate is 89.1%. 153 patients are in intensive care, 37 on ventilators.

11 March

- Mai Alkaila confirmed 1291 new cases (69 in Gaza), 1642 recoveries and 18 fatalities, excluding figures for East Jerusalem. The recovery rate is 89.3%. 155 patients are in intensive care, 39 on ventilators.

12 March

- Mai Alkaila confirmed 2309 new cases (156 in Gaza), 1593 recoveries and 22 fatalities. The recovery rate is 89.3%. 168 patients are in intensive care, 44 on ventilators.

13 March

- Mai Alkaila confirmed 1587 new cases (197 in Gaza), 1347 recoveries and 27 fatalities, excluding figures for East Jerusalem. 170 patients are in intensive care, 48 on ventilators.

14 March

- Mai Alkaila confirmed 2142 new cases (70 in Gaza), 2169 recoveries and 15 fatalities. The recovery rate is 89.3%. 177 patients are in intensive care, 49 on ventilators.

15 March

- Mai Alkaila confirmed 2298 new cases (166 in Gaza), 2169 recoveries and 25 fatalities, excluding figures for East Jerusalem. 181 patients are in intensive care, 53 on ventilators.

16 March

- Mai Alkaila confirmed 2397 new cases (298 in Gaza), 2547 recoveries and 27 fatalities. 183 patients are in intensive care, 54 on ventilators.

17 March

- Mai Alkaila confirmed 2193 new cases (277 in Gaza), 2080 recoveries and 29 fatalities. The recovery rate is 89.3%. 187 patients are in intensive care, 56 on ventilators.

18 March

- Mai Alkaila confirmed 2300 new cases (270 in Gaza), 2112 recoveries and 18 fatalities. 190 patients are in intensive care, 55 on ventilators.

19 March

- Mai Alkaila confirmed 1851 new cases (256 in Gaza), 1794 recoveries and 21 fatalities. The recovery rate is 89.3%. 192 patients are in intensive care, 54 on ventilators.

20 March

- Mai Alkaila confirmed 1780 new cases (248 in Gaza), 1695 recoveries and 27 fatalities.192 patients are in intensive care, 60 on ventilators.

21 March

- Mai Alkaila confirmed 2247 new cases (307 in Gaza), 1753 recoveries and 21 fatalities, excluding figures for East Jerusalem. The recovery rate is 89.3%. 198 patients are in intensive care, 60 on ventilators.

22 March

- Mai Alkaila confirmed 2338 new cases (358 in Gaza), 1534 recoveries and 31 fatalities, excluding figures for East Jerusalem. 198 patients are in intensive care, 60 on ventilators. The vaccination rollout commenced on 21 March, 6866 people were vaccinated in the West Bank and 12267 people in the Gaza Strip.

23 March

- Mai Alkaila confirmed 2259 new cases (450 in Gaza), 2196 recoveries and 20 fatalities. 205 patients are in intensive care, 58 on ventilators. Since the vaccination rollout began, 8157 people were vaccinated in the West Bank and 13576 people in Gaza.

24 March

- Mai Alkaila confirmed 2032 new cases (514 in Gaza),1665 recoveries and 23 fatalities. The recovery rate is 89.1%. 206 patients are in intensive care, 58 on ventilators.

25 March

- Mai Alkaila confirmed 2093 new cases (554 in Gaza), 2163 recoveries and 20 fatalities. 205 patients are in intensive care, 69 on ventilators. To date, 13,499 people have been vaccinated in the West Bank, and 15,986 people in Gaza Strip.

26 March

- Mai Alkaila confirmed 1511 new cases (617 in Gaza), 1625 recoveries and 16 fatalities. The recovery rate is 89.3%. 205 patients are in intensive care, 69 on ventilators. To date, 33,554 people have been vaccinated including 6,045 people who have received a second dose. people have been vaccinated in the West Bank, and 15,986 people in Gaza Strip.

27 March

- Mai Alkaila confirmed 1319 new cases (605 in Gaza, confirming a surge in cases there), 2037 recoveries and 23 fatalities. 197 patients are in intensive care, 63 on ventilators. To date, 45,505 people have been vaccinated in the West Bank and 18,598 in Gaza.

28 March

- Mai Alkaila confirmed 1714 new cases (857 in Gaza), 1664 recoveries and 24 fatalities, excluding figures for East Jerusalem. The recovery rate is 89.6%. 197 patients are in intensive care, 63 on ventilators. To date, 65,098 people have received a first jab including 7,048 receiving a second dose.

29 March

- Mai Alkaila confirmed 1786 new cases (815 in Gaza, confirming a surge there), 1181 recoveries and 18 fatalities, excluding figures for East Jerusalem. 207 patients are in intensive care, 65 on ventilators. To date, 48,693 people in the West Bank have been vaccinated and 20,362 in Gaza.

30 March

- Mai Alkaila confirmed 1870 new cases (785 in Gaza), 2395 recoveries and 16 fatalities. 213 patients are in intensive care, 68 on ventilators. 52,449 people in the West Bank have and 21,515 people in Gaza have been vaccinated.

31 March

- Mai Alkaila confirmed 2288 new cases (1061 in Gaza), 1839 recoveries and 13 fatalities. The recovery rate is 89.7%. 209 patients are in intensive care, 68 on ventilators. 78,379 people were vaccinated including 8,687 people who received a second dose.

==== April 2021 ====
Extended content

1 April

- Mai Alkaila confirmed 2353 new cases (1081 in Gaza), 1956 recoveries and 20 fatalities. 209 patients are in intensive care, 67 on ventilators. 60,029 people were vaccinated in the West Bank and 23,793 in Gaza.

2 April

- Mai Alkaila confirmed 2248 new cases (1185 in Gaza, the surge in cases is attributed to COVID variants), 1709 recoveries and 16 fatalities, excluding figures for East Jerusalem. The recovery rate is 89.5%. 204 patients are in intensive care, 63 on ventilators. 89,933 people have been vaccinated, 10,146 receiving a second dose.

3 April

- Mai Alkaila confirmed 1651 new cases (636 in Gaza), 1665 recoveries and 24 fatalities. 204 patients are in intensive care, 63 on ventilators. 65,366 people have been vaccinated in the West Bank and 24,838 people in Gaza.

4 April

- Mai Alkaila confirmed a record 2806 new cases (1628 in Gaza), 1589 recoveries and 25 fatalities. The recovery rate is 89.3%. 201 patients are in intensive care, 61 on ventilators. 91,626 people have been vaccinated, 11,129 with second doses.

5 April

- Mai Alkaila confirmed 2634 new cases (1561 in Gaza), 1242 recoveries and 25 fatalities, excluding figures for East Jerusalem. The recovery rate is 89.3%. 199 patients are in intensive care, 58 on ventilators. 73,277 people have been vaccinated in the West Bank, 27,275 people in Gaza.

6 April

- Mai Alkaila confirmed 2593 new cases (1463 in Gaza), 1455 recoveries and 21 fatalities. 203 patients are in intensive care, 60 on ventilators. 81,543 people have been vaccinated in the West Bank, 28,351 in Gaza.

7 April

- Mai Alkaila confirmed 2672 new cases (1916 in Gaza), 1538 recoveries and 18 fatalities. The recovery rate is 88.3%. 203 patients are in intensive care, 65 on ventilators. 120,772 people have been vaccinated, 11,620 with a second dose.

8 April

- Mai Alkaila confirmed 2884 new cases (1932 in Gaza), 1898 recoveries and 28 fatalities. 201 patients are in intensive care, 61 on ventilators. Over 100,000 people have been vaccinated in the West Bank and 30,000 people in Gaza.

9 April

- Mai Alkaila confirmed 2418 new cases (1673 in Gaza), 2026 recoveries and 33 fatalities. 190 patients are in intensive care, 54 on ventilators. 140,032 people have been vaccinated 12,471 having received a second dose.

10 April

- Mai Alkaila confirmed 1502 new cases (1064 in Gaza), 1412 recoveries and 26 fatalities. 190 patients are in intensive care, 50 on ventilators. 108,870 people have been vaccinated in the West Bank, 31,611 in Gaza.

11 April

- Mai Alkaila confirmed 2235 new cases (1479 in Gaza), 1672 recoveries and 22 fatalities, excluding figures for East Jerusalem. The recovery rate is 88%. 185 patients are in intensive care, 50 on ventilators. 140,932 people have been vaccinated, 13,167 with a second dose.

12 April

- Mai Alkaila confirmed 2762 new cases (1764 in Gaza), 1855 recoveries and 26 fatalities. The recovery rate is 87.8%. 186 patients are in intensive care, 54 on ventilators. 146,986 people have been vaccinated, 113,958 people in the West Bank, 33,028 in Gaza, 14,674 people receiving a second dose.

13 April

- Mai Alkaila confirmed 1911 new cases (1292 in Gaza), 2348 recoveries and 18 fatalities. The recovery rate is 88%. 182 patients are in intensive care, 56 on ventilators. 151,022 people have been vaccunated, 17,660 with a second dose.

14 April

- Mai Alkaila confirmed 1923 new cases (1425 in Gaza), 2245 recoveries and 22 fatalities. The recovery rate is 88.2%. 180 patients are in intensive care, 57 on ventilators. 153,911 people have been vaccinated, 19,940 with a second dose.

15 April

- Mai Alkaila confirmed 1717 new cases (1162 in Gaza), 2052 recoveries and 14 fatalities. 177 patients are in intensive care, 54 on ventilators. 156,446 people have been vaccinated.

16 April

- Mai Alkaila confirmed 1717 new cases (1138 in Gaza), 2276recoveries and 19 fatalities. 172 patients are in intensive care, 54 on ventilators. 159.000 people have been vaccinated, 23,113 with a second dose.

17 April

- Mai Alkaila confirmed 1618 new cases (1318 in Gaza), 1773 recoveries and 28 fatalities, excluding figures for East Jerusalem. The recovery rate is 88.7%. 172 patients are in intensive care, 54 on ventilators. 159.700 people have been vaccinated, 23,113 with a second dose.

18 April

- Mai Alkaila confirmed 988 new cases (466 in Gaza), 2064 recoveries and 34 fatalities, excluding figures for East Jerusalem. The recovery rate is 89.1%. 170 patients are in intensive care, 48 on ventilators. 159.900 people have been vaccinated, 23,630 with a second dose.

19 April

- Mai Alkaila confirmed 1529 new cases (998 in Gaza), 2023 recoveries and 30 fatalities. 167 patients are in intensive care, 46 on ventilators. 166,849 people have been vaccinated, 131,759 in the West Bank, 35,090 in Gaza.

20 April

- Mai Alkaila confirmed 2025 new cases (1556 in Gaza), 2306 recoveries and 31 fatalities. 165 patients are in intensive care, 46 on ventilators. The number of people vaccinated was unchanged.

21 April

- Mai Alkaila confirmed 1748 new cases (1268 in Gaza), 2536 recoveries and 18 fatalities. The recovery rate is 89.8%. 164 patients are in intensive care, 43 on ventilators. 167,549 people been vaccinated, 34,730 with a second dose.

22 April

- Mai Alkaila confirmed 1652 new cases (1179 in Gaza), 2360 recoveries and 19 fatalities, excluding figures for East Jerusalem where new cases and deaths have fallen sharply. 153 patients are in intensive care,37 on ventilators. 167,711 people have been vaccinated, 132,621 in the West Bank and 35,090 people in Gaza.

23 April

- Mai Alkaila confirmed 1440 new cases (992 in Gaza), 2546 recoveries and 23 fatalities, excluding figures for East Jerusalem. The recovery rate is 90.4%. 147 patients are in intensive care, 40 on ventilators. 169,800 people have been vaccinated, 43,382 with a second dose.

24 April

- Mai Alkaila confirmed 1139 new cases (872 in Gaza), 1545 recoveries and 13 fatalities. 153 patients are in intensive care, 43 on ventilators. 169,960 people have been vaccinated, 134,496 in the West Bank and 35,464 in Gaza.

25 April

- Mai Alkaila confirmed 714 new cases (305 in Gaza), 1952 recoveries and 16 fatalities, excluding figures for East Jerusalem. The recovery rate is 91.1%. 151 patients are in intensive care, 44 on ventilators. 170,100 people have been vaccinated, 43,000 with a second dose.

26 April

- Mai Alkaila confirmed 1080 new cases (591 in Gaza), 2058 recoveries and 17 fatalities. The recovery rate is 91.3%. 137 patients are in intensive care, 41 on ventilators. 249,746 people have been vaccinated, 157,701 with a second dose.

27 April

- Mai Alkaila confirmed 1414 new cases (1038 in Gaza), 2686 recoveries and 17 fatalities, excluding figures for East Jerusalem. The recovery rate is 91.7%. 140 patients are in intensive care, 41 on ventilators. 251,628 people have been vaccinated, 165,426 with a second dose.

28 April

- Mai Alkaila confirmed 1084 new cases (795 in Gaza), 2043 recoveries and 14 fatalities. The recovery rate is 92.1%. 145 patients are in intensive care, 40 on ventilators. 253,937 people have been vaccinated, 172,916 with a second dose.

29 April

- Mai Alkaila confirmed 1051 new cases (723 in Gaza), 1844 recoveries and 16 fatalities. 147 patients are in intensive care, 41 on ventilators. 255,602 people have been vaccinated, 218,821 in the West Bank and 36,781 in Gaza.

30 April

- Mai Alkaila confirmed 861 new cases (572 in Gaza), 1100 recoveries and 18 fatalities, excluding figures for East Jerusalem. The recovery rate is 92.4%. 142 patients are in intensive care, 40 on ventilators. 257,600 people have been vaccinated, 184,000 with a second dose.

==== May 2021 ====
Extended content

1 May

- Mai Alkaila confirmed 664 new cases (493 in Gaza), 1942 recoveries and 8 fatalities, excluding figures for East Jerusalem. The recovery rate is 92.9%. 146 patients are in intensive care, 43 on ventilators. 257,700 people have been vaccinated, 184,000 with a second dose.

2 May

- Mai Alkaila confirmed 512 new cases (233 in Gaza), 1117 recoveries and 15 fatalities, excluding figures for East Jerusalem. The recovery rate is 93.1%. 142 patients are in intensive care, 39 on ventilators. 257,800 people have been vaccinated, 185,000 with a second dose.

3 May

- Mai Alkaila confirmed 565 new cases (371 in Gaza), 779 recoveries and 11 fatalities, excluding figures for East Jerusalem. The recovery rate is 93.1%. 133 patients are in intensive care, 39 on ventilators. 258,065 people have been vaccinated, 186,040 with a second dose.

4 May

- Mai Alkaila confirmed 718 new cases (458 in Gaza), 1502 recoveries and 18 fatalities, excluding figures for East Jerusalem. The recovery rate is 93.4%. 129 patients are in intensive care, 41 on ventilators. 259.507 people have been vaccinated, 190,051 with a second dose.

5 May

- Mai Alkaila confirmed 815 new cases (612 in Gaza), 1979 recoveries and 21 fatalities. The recovery rate is 93.8%. 136 patients are in intensive care, 40 on ventilators. 261,322 people have been vaccinated, 192,201 with a second dose.

6 May

- Mai Alkaila confirmed 651 new cases (439 in Gaza), 1931 recoveries and 9 fatalities. The recovery rate is 94.2%. 133 patients are in intensive care, 39 on ventilators. 263,475 people have been vaccinated, 193,127 with a second dose.

7 May

- Mai Alkaila confirmed 559 new cases (404 in Gaza), 2148 recoveries and 12 fatalities. The recovery rate is 94.6%. 102 patients are in intensive care, 29 on ventilators. 266,300 people have been vaccinated, 193,700 with a second dose.

8 May

- Mai Alkaila confirmed 491 new cases (398 in Gaza), 1643 recoveries and 14 fatalities. 87 patients are in intensive care, 25 on ventilators. 266,472 people have been vaccinated, 228,304 in the West Bank and 38,168 in Gaza.

9 May

- Mai Alkaila confirmed 314 new cases (142 in Gaza), 810 recoveries and 7 fatalities, excluding figures for East Jerusalem. 80 patients are in intensive care, 26 on ventilators. 266,600 people have been vaccinated, 193,790 with a second dose.

10 May

- Mai Alkaila confirmed 498 new cases (344 in Gaza), 821 recoveries and 20 fatalities. 78 patients are in intensive care, 25 on ventilators. 269,292 people have been vaccinated, 230,540 in the West Bank and 38,752 in Gaza.

11 May

- Mai Alkaila confirmed 528 new cases (386 in Gaza), 717 recoveries and 15 fatalities. 75 patients are in intensive care, 26 on ventilators. 271,344 people have been vaccinated, 232,551 in the West Bank and 38,793 in Gaza.

12 May

- Mai Alkaila confirmed 493 new cases (373 in Gaza), 959 recoveries and 8 fatalities. 73 patients are in intensive care, 23 on ventilators. 271,530 people have been vaccinated, 232,737 in the West Bank and 38,793 in Gaza.

15 May

- Mai Alkaila confirmed 114 new cases (54 in Gaza), 1062 recoveries and 8 fatalities. 65 patients are in intensive care, 22 on ventilators. 271,607 people have been vaccinated, 195,207 with a second dose.

17 May

- Mai Alkaila confirmed 247 new cases (72 in Gaza), 1285 recoveries and 9 fatalities. 66 patients are in intensive care, 18 on ventilators. 273,438 people have been vaccinated, 195,675 with a second dose.

18 May

- Mai Alkaila confirmed 253 new cases (110 in Gaza), 905 recoveries and 6 fatalities. The recovery rate is 97%. 60 patients are in intensive care, 14 on ventilators. 236,496 have been vaccinated in the West Bank and 38,809 in Gaza for a total 275,305 vaccinated, 196,112 with a second dose.

19 May

- Mai Alkaila confirmed 205 new cases (122 in Gaza), 930 recoveries and 5 fatalities. The recovery rate is 97.3%. 59 patients are in intensive care, 14 on ventilators. 237,655 have been vaccinated in the West Bank and 38,809 in Gaza for a total 276,464 vaccinated, 196,153 with a second dose.

21 May

- Mai Alkaila confirmed 212 new cases (110 in Gaza), 383 recoveries and 2 fatalities. The recovery rate is 97.5%. 55 patients are in intensive care, 13 on ventilators. 243,947 have been vaccinated in the West Bank and 38,812 in Gaza for a total 282,759 vaccinated, 197,189 with a second dose.

22 May

- Mai Alkaila confirmed 233 new cases (187 in Gaza), 300 recoveries and 7 fatalities. The recovery rate is 97.5%. 43 patients are in intensive care, 10 on ventilators. 282,800 have been vaccinated, 197,190 with a second dose.

23 May

- Mai Alkaila confirmed 221 new cases (187 in Gaza), 640 recoveries and 7 fatalities. The recovery rate is 97.7%. 44 patients are in intensive care, 9 on ventilators. 283,101 have been vaccinated, 197,327 with a second dose.

24 May

- Mai Alkaila confirmed 355 new cases (272 in Gaza), 661 recoveries and 4 fatalities. The recovery rate is 97.7%. 46 patients are in intensive care, 10 on ventilators.

25 May

- Mai Alkaila confirmed 557 new cases (448 in Gaza), 522 recoveries and 10 fatalities. The recovery rate is 97.7%. 46 patients are in intensive care, 10 on ventilators. 290,505 people have been vaccinated, 203,161 with a second dose. Palestine has received 102,960 doses of the Pfizer vaccine, via COVAX.

26 May

- Mai Alkaila confirmed 461 new cases (403 in Gaza), 522 recoveries and 3 fatalities. The recovery rate is 97.8%. 40 patients are in intensive care, 8 on ventilators. 293,238 people have been vaccinated, 206,747 with a second dose.

27 May

- Mai Alkaila confirmed 379 new cases (316 in Gaza), 260 recoveries and 4 fatalities. The recovery rate is 97.7%. 45 patients are in intensive care, 7 on ventilators. 296.172 people have been vaccinated, 211,874 with a second dose.

28 May

- Mai Alkaila confirmed 395 new cases (339 in Gaza), 306 recoveries and 2 fatalities. The recovery rate is 97.7%. 45 patients are in intensive care, 7 on ventilators. 304,787 people have been vaccinated, 217,097 with a second dose.

29 May

- Mai Alkaila confirmed 269 new cases (250 in Gaza), 339 recoveries and 3 fatalities. The recovery rate is 97.7%. 29 patients are in intensive care, 6 on ventilators. 304,890 people have been vaccinated, 217,207 with a second dose.

30 May

- Mai Alkaila confirmed 210 new cases (159 in Gaza), 137 recoveries and 3 fatalities. The recovery rate is 97.7%. 24 patients are in intensive care, 5 on ventilators. 306,900 people have been vaccinated, 217,575 with a second dose.

31 May

- Mai Alkaila confirmed 302 new cases (246 in Gaza), 115 recoveries and 2 fatalities. The recovery rate is 97.7%. 23 patients are in intensive care, 5 on ventilators. 318,134 people have been vaccinated.

==== June 2021 ====
Extended content

1 June

- Mai Alkaila confirmed 382 new cases (351 in Gaza), 143 recoveries and 6 fatalities. The recovery rate is 97.7%. 25 patients are in intensive care, 4 on ventilators. 330,154 people have been vaccinated, 290,790 in the West Bank, 39,364 people in Gaza.

2 June

- Mai Alkaila confirmed 304 new cases (257 in Gaza), 294 recoveries and 4 fatalities. 23 patients are in intensive care, 3 on ventilators. 344,360 people have been vaccinated, 304,323 in the West Bank, 39,937 people in Gaza.

3 June

- Mai Alkaila confirmed 297 new cases (260 in Gaza), 230 recoveries and 2 fatalities. 22 patients are in intensive care, 3 on ventilators. 359,349 people have been vaccinated.

4 June

- Mai Alkaila confirmed 3ºº new cases (273 in Gaza), 110 recoveries and 2 fatalities. The recovery rate is 97.5%. 20 patients are in intensive care, 3 on ventilators. 372,800 people have been vaccinated.

5 June

- Mai Alkaila confirmed 209 new cases (183 in Gaza), 126 recoveries and 5 fatalities. The recovery rate is 97.5%. 21 patients are in intensive care, 2 on ventilators. 373,470 people have been vaccinated.

6 June

- Mai Alkaila confirmed 173 new cases (139 in Gaza), 211 recoveries and 1 fatalities. The recovery rate is 97.5%. 18 patients are in intensive care, 2 on ventilators. About 376,000 people have been vaccinated.

7 June

- Mai Alkaila confirmed 207 new cases (181 in Gaza), 266 recoveries and 0 fatalities. The recovery rate is 97.5%. 19 patients are in intensive care, 2 on ventilators. 386,144 people have been vaccinated.

8 June

- Mai Alkaila confirmed 311 new cases (273 in Gaza), 210 recoveries and 3 fatalities. 18 patients are in intensive care, 3 on ventilators. 393,506 people have been vaccinated.

9 June

- Mai Alkaila confirmed 246 new cases (221 in Gaza), 320 recoveries and 2 fatalities. 18 patients are in intensive care, 4 on ventilators. 399,363 people have been vaccinated.

10 June

- Mai Alkaila confirmed 228 new cases (186 in Gaza), 267 recoveries and 2 fatalities. 16 patients are in intensive care, 3 on ventilators. 404,142 people have been vaccinated.

13 June

- Mai Alkaila confirmed 123 new cases (102 in Gaza), 378 recoveries and 3 fatalities. The recovery rate is 97.7%. 13 patients are in intensive care, 2 on ventilators. Over 408,800 people have been vaccinated.

15 June

- Mai Alkaila confirmed 258 new cases (240 in Gaza), 252 recoveries and 3 fatalities. The recovery rate is 97.7%. 13 patients are in intensive care, 2 on ventilators. 418,703 people have been vaccinated.

16 June

- Mai Alkaila confirmed 216 new cases (199 in Gaza), 387 recoveries and 2 fatalities. The recovery rate is 97.8%. 13 patients are in intensive care, 2 on ventilators. 426,897 people have been vaccinated.

17 June

- Mai Alkaila confirmed 170 new cases (152 in Gaza), 428 recoveries and 1 fatalities. The recovery rate is 97.8%. 9 patients are in intensive care, 2 on ventilators. 436,275 people have been vaccinated.

18 June

- Mai Alkaila confirmed 165 new cases (151 in Gaza), 453 recoveries and 3 fatalities. The recovery rate is 97.8%. 9 patients are in intensive care, 1 on a ventilator. 445,412 people have been vaccinated.

19 June

- Mai Alkaila confirmed 106 new cases (102 in Gaza), 282 recoveries and 2 fatalities. The recovery rate is 98.0%. 9 patients are in intensive care, 2 on a ventilator. 445,600 people have been vaccinated.

20 June

- Mai Alkaila confirmed 68 new cases (63 in Gaza), 2226 recoveries and 1 fatality. The recovery rate is 98.0%. 8 patients are in intensive care, 2 on a ventilator. Over 445,600 people have been vaccinated.

22 June

- Mai Alkaila confirmed 204 new cases (194 in Gaza), 220 recoveries and 1 fatality. The recovery rate is 98.0%. 6 patients are in intensive care, 2 on a ventilator. 461,162 people have been vaccinated.

23 June

- Mai Alkaila confirmed 176 new cases (154 in Gaza), 118 recoveries and 1 fatality. The recovery rate is 98.0%. 6 patients are in intensive care, 1 on a ventilator. 467,225 people have been vaccinated.

25 June

- Mai Alkaila confirmed 156 new cases (144 in Gaza), 407 recoveries and 1 fatality. The recovery rate is 98.1%. 6 patients are in intensive care, 1 on a ventilator. 481,392 people have been vaccinated.

26 June

- Mai Alkaila confirmed 188 new cases (all in Gaza), 407 recoveries and 2 fatalities. 7 patients are in intensive care, 1 on a ventilator. 481,915 people have been vaccinated.

28 June

- Mai Alkaila confirmed 130 new cases (113 in Gaza), 275 recoveries and 2 fatalities. The recovery rate is 98.2%. 7 patients are in intensive care, 1 on a ventilator. 421,894 people have been vaccinated.

29 June

- Mai Alkaila confirmed 162 new cases (150 in Gaza), 154 recoveries and 1 fatality. 8 patients are in intensive care, 1 on a ventilator. 426,264 people have been vaccinated.

==== July 2021 ====
Extended content

1 July

- Mai Alkaila confirmed 121 new cases (108 in Gaza), 117 recoveries and 2 fatalities. The recovery rate is 98.2%. 8 patients are in intensive care, 2 on a ventilator. 509,772 people have been vaccinated.

3 July

- Mai Alkaila confirmed 83 new cases (75 in Gaza), 137 recoveries and 2 fatalities. 5 patients are in intensive care, none on a ventilator. 516,068 people have been vaccinated.

4 July

- Mai Alkaila confirmed 77 new cases (56 in Gaza), 224 recoveries and 3 fatalities. The recovery rate is 98.3%. 5 patients are in intensive care, none on a ventilator. Over 516,400 people have been vaccinated.

5 July

- Mai Alkaila confirmed 103 new cases (95 in Gaza), 171 recoveries and 1 fatality. The recovery rate is 98.3%. 6 patients are in intensive care, none on a ventilator. 523,223 people have been vaccinated.

6 July

- Mai Alkaila confirmed 108 new cases (96 in Gaza), 114 recoveries and 2 fatalities. 6 patients are in intensive care, none on a ventilator. 527,888 people have been vaccinated.

7 July

- Mai Alkaila confirmed 89 new cases (73 in Gaza), 192 recoveries and 1 fatality. 6 patients are in intensive care, none on a ventilator. 531,648 people have been vaccinated.

9 July

- Mai Alkaila confirmed 81 new cases (73 in Gaza), 152 recoveries and 0 fatalities. The recovery rate is 98.3%. 6 patients are in intensive care, none on a ventilator. Over 541,500 people have been vaccinated.

10 July

- Mai Alkaila confirmed 60 new cases (52 in Gaza), 146 recoveries and 1 fatality. 7 patients are in intensive care, 2 on a ventilator. 541,358 people have been vaccinated.

11 July

- Mai Alkaila confirmed 53 new cases (45 in Gaza), 221 recoveries and 2 fatalities. The recovery rate is 98.4%. 6 patients are in intensive care, 0 on a ventilator. Over 541,600 people have been vaccinated.

13 July

- Mai Alkaila confirmed 99 new cases (82 in Gaza), 113 recoveries and 1 fatality. The recovery rate is 98.4%. 6 patients are in intensive care, 0 on a ventilator. 552,692 people have been vaccinated.

15 July

- Mai Alkaila confirmed 95 new cases (74 in Gaza), 113 recoveries and 0 fatalities. 7 patients are in intensive care, 0 on a ventilator. 560,195 people have been vaccinated.

16 July

- Mai Alkaila confirmed 71 new cases (61 in Gaza), 63 recoveries and 1 fatality. The recovery rate is 98.4%. 9 patients are in intensive care, 0 on a ventilator. 565,552 people have been vaccinated.

17 July

- Mai Alkaila confirmed 66 new cases (63 in Gaza), 134 recoveries and 1 fatality. The recovery rate is 98.4%. 9 patients are in intensive care, 0 on a ventilator. 565,660 people have been vaccinated.

18 July

- Mai Alkaila confirmed 58 new cases (43 in Gaza), 23 recoveries and 0 fatalities. The recovery rate is 98.4%. 11 patients are in intensive care, 0 on a ventilator. Over 568,500 people have been vaccinated.

21 July

- Mai Alkaila confirmed 115 new cases (102 in Gaza), 360 recoveries and 2 fatalities. The recovery rate is 98.4%. 11 patients are in intensive care, 0 on a ventilator. 572,035 people have been vaccinated.

22 July

- Mai Alkaila confirmed 33 new cases (18 in Gaza), 228 recoveries and 2 fatalities. The recovery rate is 98.6%. 11 patients are in intensive care, 0 on a ventilator. 572,035 people have been vaccinated.

23 July

- Mai Alkaila confirmed 59 new cases (41 in Gaza), 191 recoveries and 3 fatalities. The recovery rate is 98.6%. 11 patients are in intensive care, 0 on a ventilator. 572,344 people have been vaccinated.

27 July

- Mai Alkaila confirmed 139 new cases (113 in Gaza), 62 recoveries and 1 fatality. The recovery rate is 98.6%. 9 patients are in intensive care, 1 on a ventilator. 578,364 people have been vaccinated.

28 July

- Mai Alkaila confirmed 159 new cases (119 in Gaza), 92 recoveries and 0 fatalities.10 patients are in intensive care, 1 on a ventilator. 581,721 people have been vaccinated.

29 July

- Mai Alkaila confirmed 116 new cases (88 in Gaza), 58 recoveries and 0 fatalities. 9 patients are in intensive care, 1 on a ventilator. 587,393 people have been vaccinated.

30 July

- Mai Alkaila confirmed 135 new cases (104 in Gaza), 60 recoveries and 2 fatalities. The recovery rate is 98.5%. 9 patients are in intensive care, 0 on a ventilator. 591,526 people have been vaccinated.

31 July

- Mai Alkaila confirmed 123 new cases (106 in Gaza), 86 recoveries and 1 fatality. The recovery rate is 98.5%. 9 patients are in intensive care, 0 on a ventilator. Over 591,500 people have been vaccinated.

==== August 2021 ====
Extended content

1 August

- Mai Alkaila confirmed 111 new cases (71 in Gaza), 111 recoveries and 3 fatalities. The recovery rate is 98.5%. 9 patients are in intensive care, 0 on a ventilator. Over 591,600 people have been vaccinated with a first dose.

3 August

- Mai Alkaila confirmed 181 new cases (151 in Gaza), 140 recoveries and no fatalities. 13 patients are in intensive care, 2 on a ventilator. 599,370 people have been vaccinated with a first dose.

4–6 August

- There were 471 new cases (including 32 in East Jerusalem), 122 recoveries and 2 fatalities. The recovery rate is 98.4%. 11 patients are in intensive care, 2 on a ventilator. 607,942 people have been vaccinated with a first dose.

7–9 August

- Between 7 and 9 August, there were 478 new cases, 122 recoveries and 4 fatalities. The recovery rate is 98.3%. 15 patients are in intensive care, 2 on a ventilator. 613,756 people have been vaccinated with a first dose.

10–12 August

- Between 10 and 12 August, there were 1180 new cases, 342 recoveries and 6 fatalities. 11 patients are in intensive care, 2 on a ventilator. 626,279 people have been vaccinated with a first dose.

13–15 August

- Between 13 and 15 August, there were 1251 new cases, 419 recoveries and 3 fatalities. The recovery rate is 97.8%. 17 patients are in intensive care, 3 on a ventilator. Over 638,000 people have been vaccinated with a first dose.

16–18 August

- Between 16 and 18 August, there were 2272 new cases, 395 recoveries and 1 fatality. 22 patients are in intensive care, 3 on a ventilator. Over 667,894 people have been vaccinated with a first dose (124,092 in Gaza). Epidemiological situation has worsened due to the Delta variant.

19–21 August

- Between 19 and 21 August, there were 2750 new cases, 680 recoveries and 5 fatalities. 30 patients are in intensive care, 6 on a ventilator. About a third of the population the West Bank have been vaccinated and around 10% in Gaza.

22–24 August

- Between 22 and 24 August, there were 3842 new cases, 783 recoveries and 14 fatalities. 29 patients are in intensive care, 7 on a ventilator. About 35% of the population of the West Bank have been vaccinated and around 11% in Gaza. Officials warned of a sharp surge in the numbers due to the Delta variant and urged people to get vaccinated.

25–26 August

- Between 25 and 26 August, with cases rising due to the Delta variant, there were 3464 new cases, 677 recoveries and 11. fatalities. The recovery rate is 95.2%. 33 patients are in intensive care, 4 on a ventilator. About 37% of the population the West Bank have been vaccinated and around 12% in Gaza.

27–29 August

- Between 27 and 29 August, with cases rising due to the Delta variant, there were 4796 new cases, 1331 recoveries and 15 fatalities. The recovery rate is 94.3%. 45 patients are in intensive care, 7 on a ventilator. Over 843,500 people have received a first dose of the vaccine.

30 August – 1 September

- Between 30 August and 1 September there were 7552 new cases, 2137 recoveries and 16 fatalities. The recovery rate is 93.0%. 50 patients are in intensive care, 8 on a ventilator. 991,613 people have received a first dose of the vaccine.

==== September 2021 ====
Extended content

2–4 September

- Between 2 and 4 September there were 6947 new cases, 2944 recoveries and 32 fatalities. The recovery rate is 92.0%. 52 patients are in intensive care, 8 on a ventilator. Over 1,087,000 people have received a first dose of the vaccine.

5–7 September

- Between 5 and 7 September there were 7427 new cases, 3997 recoveries and 35 fatalities. The recovery rate is 91.3%. 64 patients are in intensive care, 14 on a ventilator. 1,150,913 people have received a first dose of the vaccine.

8–9 September

- Between 8 and 9 September there were 5128 new cases, 3432 recoveries and 25 fatalities. 70 patients are in intensive care, 8 on a ventilator. 1,185,157 people have received a first dose of the vaccine.

10–12 September

- Between 10 and 12 September there were 5397 new cases, 5581 recoveries and 37 fatalities. The recovery rate is 91.2%. 73 patients are in intensive care, 15 on a ventilator. 1,209,500 people have received a first dose of the vaccine.

13–15 September

- Between 13 and 15 September there were 7466 new cases, 5632 recoveries and 39 fatalities. 77 patients are in intensive care, 17 on a ventilator. 1,255,840 people have received a first dose of the vaccine.

16–18 September

- Between 16 and 18 September there were 5450 new cases, 7651 recoveries and 53 fatalities. The recovery rate is 91.4%. 79 patients are in intensive care, 10 on a ventilator. Over 1,287,800 people have received a first dose of the vaccine

19–21 September

- Between 19 and 21 September there were 5886 new cases, 5703 recoveries and 43 fatalities. 73 patients are in intensive care, 12 on a ventilator. 1,319,937 people have received a first dose of the vaccine.

22–23 September

- Between 22 and 23 September there were 3982 new cases, 4792 recoveries and 28 fatalities. 72 patients are in intensive care, 14 on a ventilator. 1,347,092 people have received a first dose of the vaccine.

24–26 September

- Between 24 and 26 September there were 4792 new cases, 7066 recoveries and 45 fatalities. The recovery rate is 92.4%. 71 patients are in intensive care, 17 on a ventilator. 1,362,200 people have received a first dose of the vaccine

27–29 September

- Between 27 and 29 September there were 5511 new cases, 5163 recoveries and 55 fatalities. 75 patients are in intensive care, 18 on a ventilator. 1,392,986 people have received a first dose of the vaccine.

==== October 2021 ====
Extended content
- Between 30 September and 2 October there were 3480 new cases, 5874 recoveries and 52 fatalities. 66 patients are in intensive care, 17 on a ventilator. Over 1,403,000 people have received a first dose of the vaccine as of 1 October.
- Between 3 September and 5 October there were 3709 new cases, 4569 recoveries and 38 fatalities. 71 patients are in intensive care, 16 on a ventilator. 1,146,311 people have received a first dose of the vaccine.
- Between 6 September and 8 October there were 2904 new cases, 5001 recoveries and 46 fatalities. 82 patients are in intensive care, 18 on a ventilator.

=== March 2022 ===
In March 2022, Singapore provided an aid package worth about 750,000 Singaporean dollars to the Palestinian Authority. Items included test kits, masks, and scholarship for training healthcare professionals.

== Statistics ==
=== Charts ===
The charts for confirmed new cases and confirmed deaths per day are based on the data collected by the Palestinian National Institute of Public Health for the Northern Governorates, Southern Governorates and East Jerusalem, as per the actual dates.

== Palestinians abroad ==
The FAE announced 500 cases and 23 deaths among Palestinians in the diaspora, including 349 cases and 15 deaths in the United States. The ministry noted that around 1,000 Palestinian doctors were participating in health efforts in Europe along with hundreds more in the US, Venezuela and Cuba among other states. Four doctors were declared dead after contracting coronavirus; one in New Jersey, two in Spain and one in Italy, while some 20 American doctors and paramedics tested positive for the virus in New Jersey.

The FAE updated to 678 cases and 30 deaths, 437 and 22 respectively being in the U.S., 3 in Spain and one each in Italy, the Netherlands, Austria, Algeria and Sweden.

The FAE announced on 23 April the first death among the Palestinian community in the United Kingdom raising the number of diaspora Palestinians worldwide who died from the disease to 49. The overall number of cases among diaspora Palestinians rose to 1042 with the majority of cases and deaths being in the United States. On 4 May, the FAE confirmed cases and deaths among Palestinians in the diaspora have risen to 1,275 and 68 respectively with 512 recoveries. On 18 May, the FAE confirmed 1,573 cases and 85 deaths with 744 recoveries. As of 2 June, there were 1,793 cases, 112 deaths and 946 recoveries, according to FAE. On 17 June 2020, FAE confirmed 30 new cases in the diaspora for a total of 2078 and two deaths for a total of 142. On 24 June 2020, the FAE confirmed 3,801 cases and 193 fatalities in the diaspora with 1,643 recoveries. On 5 September 2020, the FAE announced four new cases among Palestinians abroad raising the total to 5817 while 1969 have recovered. Among total worldwide deaths of 244 a new death was recorded in Saudi Arabia bringing the total in that country to 79. The four new cases were recorded in New York and New Jersey, bringing total cases among Palestinians in the US to 3526, while deaths stood at 74.

As of 15 October 2020, the FAE confirmed two fatalities in the diaspora, raising the total among Palestinian communities abroad to 269 while the total confirmed cases reached 6,470. On 17 January 2021, the FAE announced cases reached 9236 and fatalities reached 355.

== Photo gallery ==
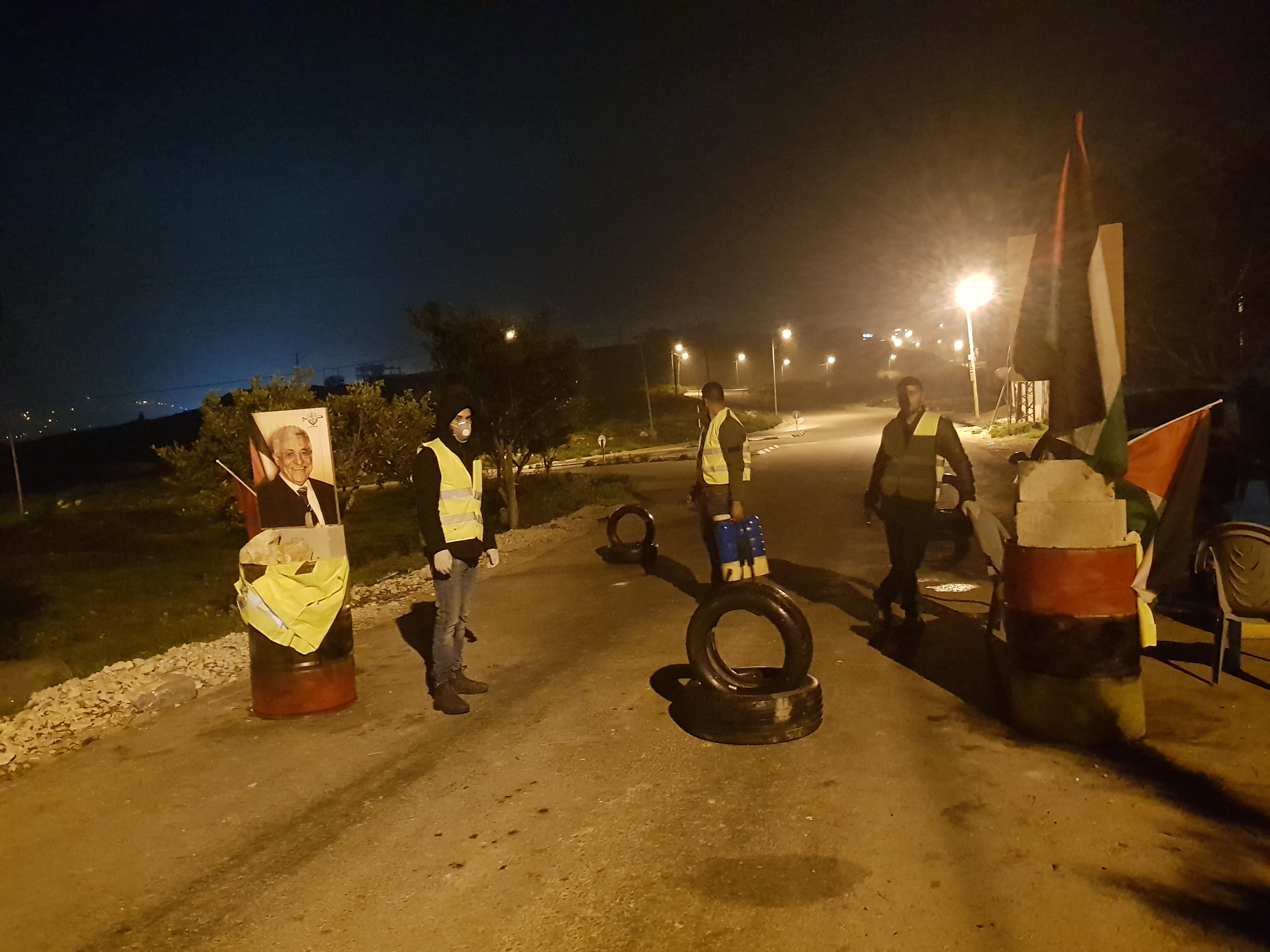
Emergency committee checkpoint in Qusin

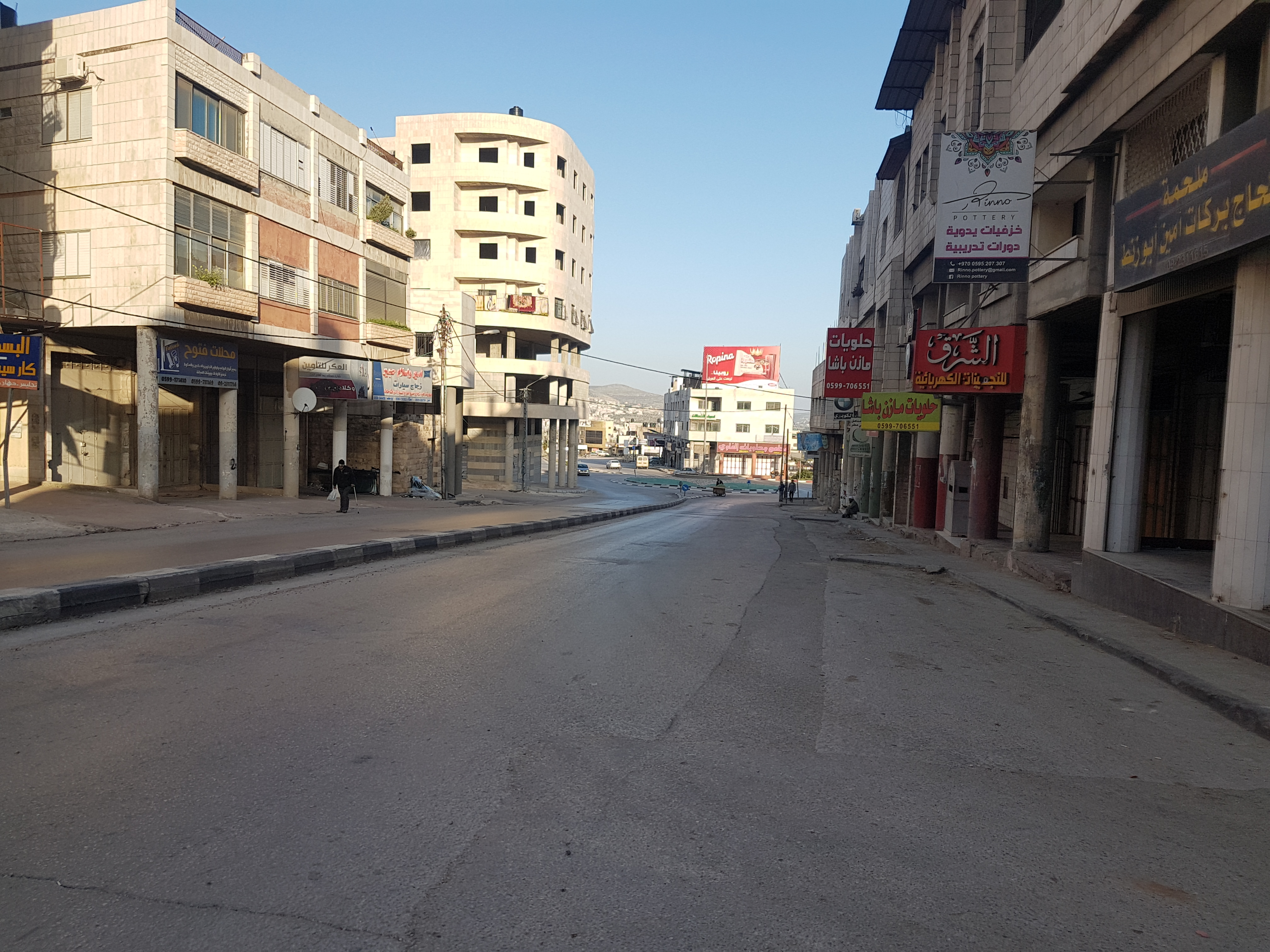
Amman Street in Nablus is deserted due to the mandatory quarantine

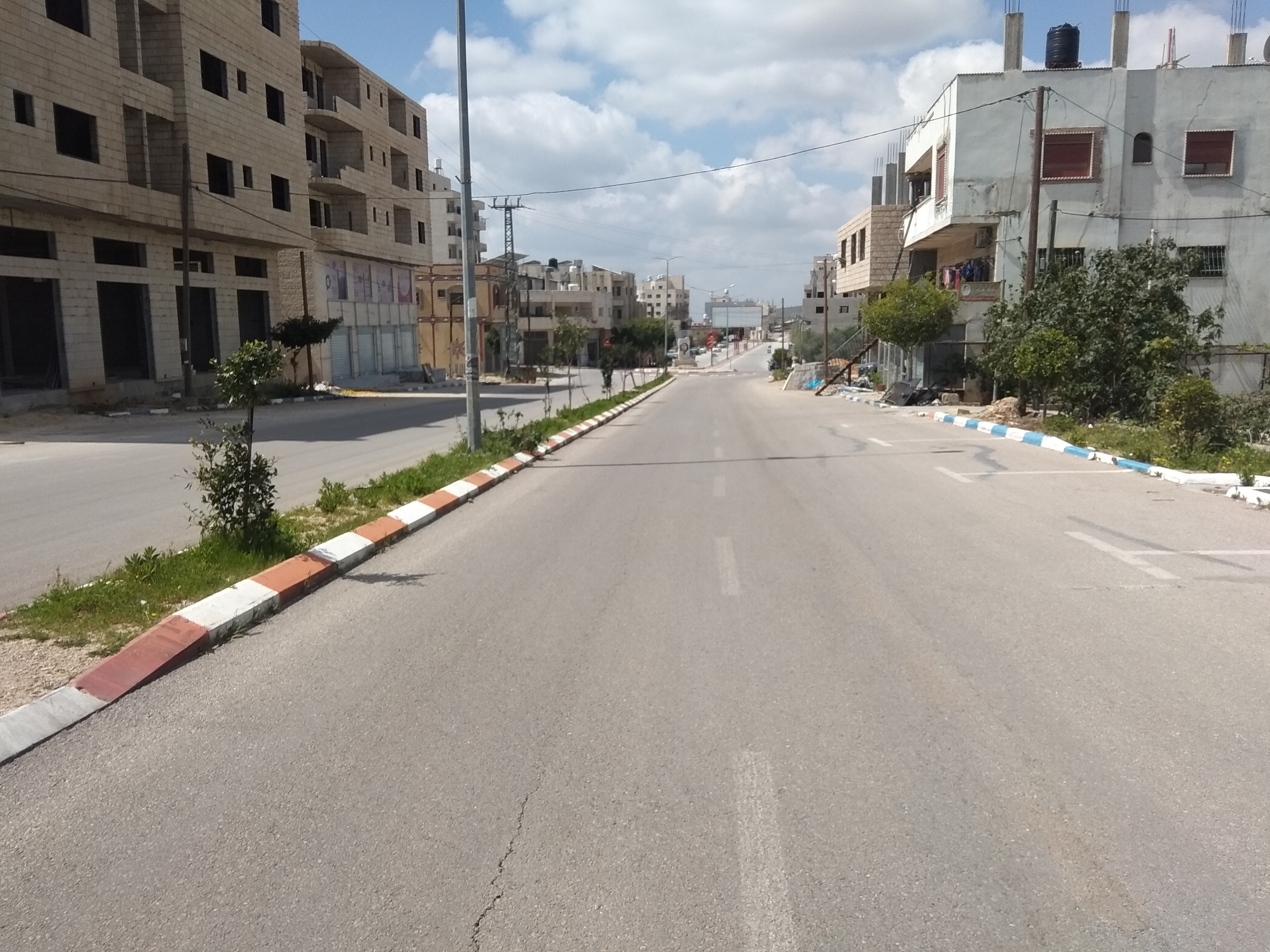
Madinah Al Munawwarah Street in Salfit is deserted due to the mandatory quarantine

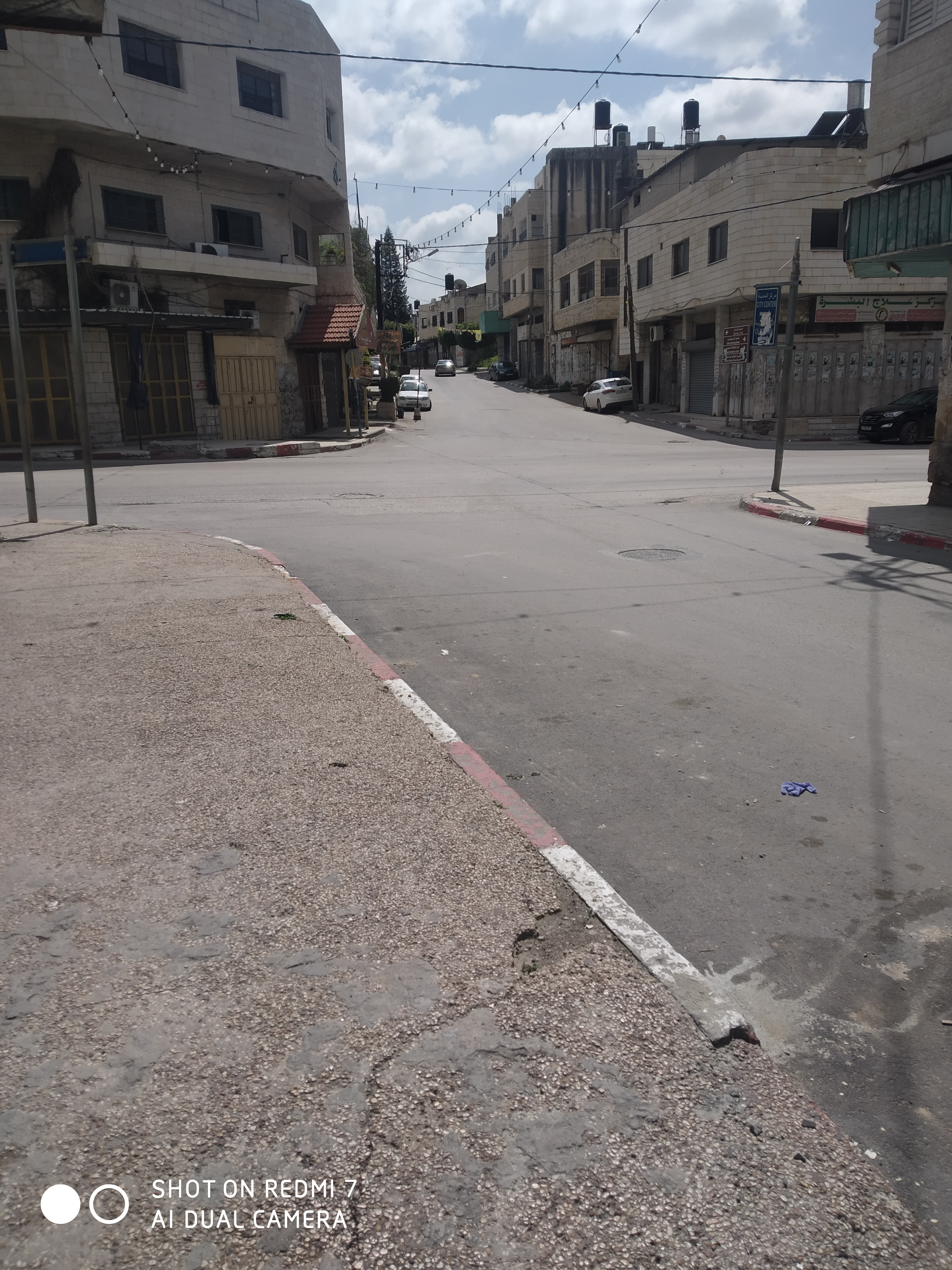
The public market in Tulkarm is deserted due to the mandatory quarantine

== See also ==
- COVID-19 pandemic in Jordan
- COVID-19 pandemic in Israel
- COVID-19 pandemic in Lebanon
