= Al-Qubeiba, Jerusalem =

al-Qubeiba
- Municipality type C

Arabic transcription(s)
  - Arabic: القبيبة
  - Latin: al-Qubeibah (official) al-Qubaybah (unofficial)
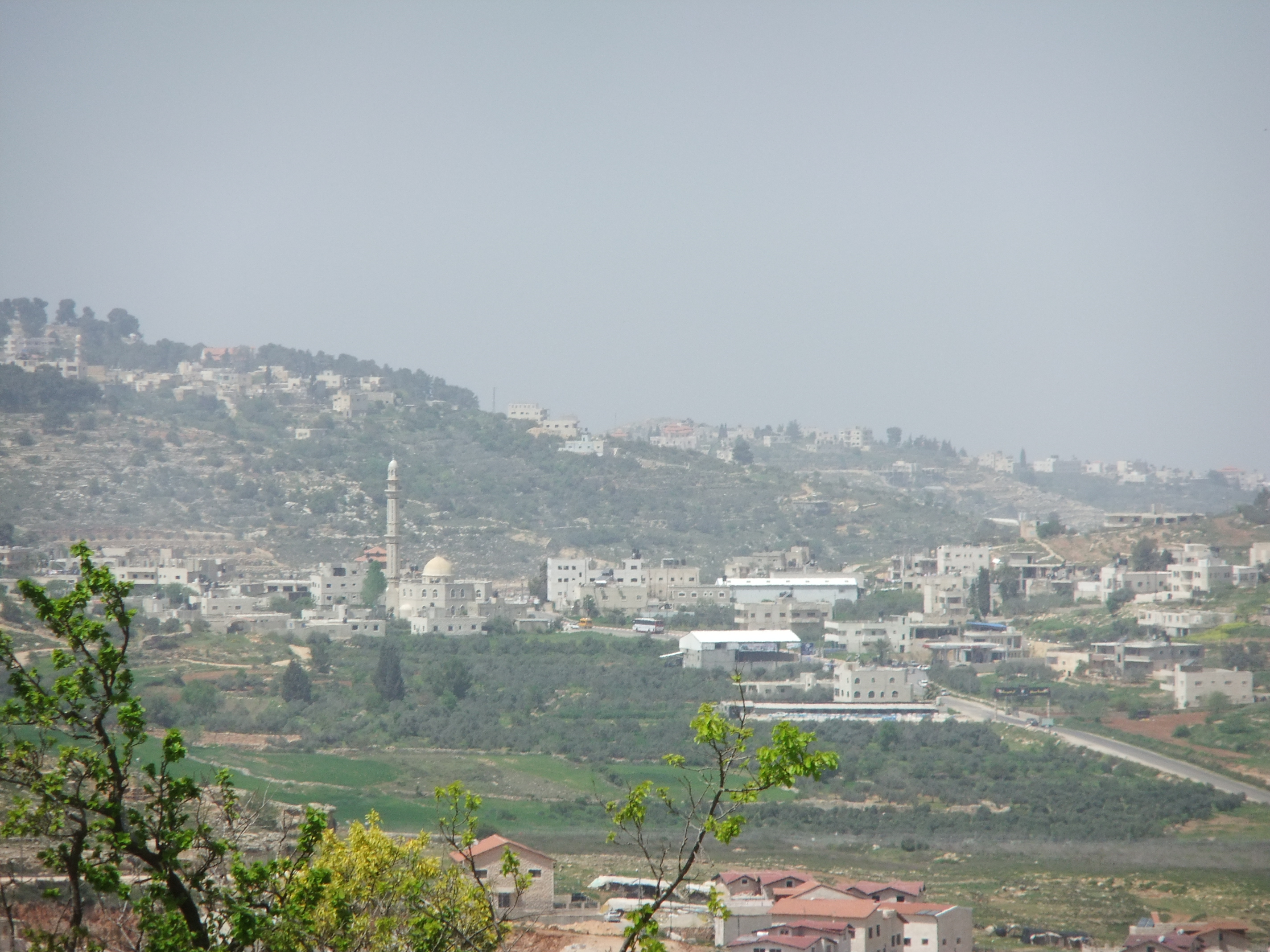

- Location of al-Qubeiba within Palestine
- Coordinates: 31°50′24″N 35°08′13″E
- Palestine grid: 163/138
- State: State of Palestine
- Governorate: Quds

Government
  - Type: Municipality
  - Head of Municipality: Mr. Hasanayn Hammouda

Population (2017)
  - Total: 3,876
- Name meaning: "The little dome"

Al-Qubeiba (Arabic: القبيبة) is a Palestinian town in the Jerusalem Governorate of Palestine, located 2 kilometers northwest of Jerusalem in the central West Bank. According to the Palestinian Central Bureau of Statistics in 2017, the village had a population of 3,876. Al-Qubeiba lies at an altitude of 783m to 795m above sea-level. It is located in a conflict area near the border with Israel between Ramallah and Jerusalem. The settlement of Giv'on HaHadashah lies 5 km southeast of al-Qubeiba. It is surrounded by the town of Biddu (east), Beit 'Anan (northwest), Qatanna (southwest), and Kharayib Umm al-Lahim (west). Unlike the surrounding region, al-Qubeiba has large areas covered with pine and olive trees.

== History ==
=== Crusader to Mamluk period ===
In the Crusader era a new Frankish village was erected along the still extant Roman road and received the name Parva Mahomeria. In 1159 it was mentioned in a document defining its borders with Beit 'Anan.

After the expulsion of the Crusaders from the Holy Land, the next Christian established presence in Palestine were the Franciscan custodians of the holy sites. During the 13th century Qubeibeh was gradually adopted by pilgrims as the location of Emmaus, the village mentioned in Luke 24:13-35, eventually replacing Abu Ghosh in this function. From 1335 on the Franciscans adopted it too and began an annual pilgrimage to this site.

=== Late Ottoman period ===
In 1838 el-Kubeibeh was noted as a Muslim village, part of Beni Malik area, located west of Jerusalem.

In 1863 the French explorer Victor Guérin described it as a village of a hundred people who lived in old houses, each consisting of a single vaulted room.

An Ottoman village list from about 1870 found that el-kubebe had a population of 79, in 12 houses, though the population count included only men.

In 1883, the PEF's Survey of Western Palestine described it as a "village of moderate size, standing on a flat ridge with a few olives to the west. [..] To the west is a monastery of Latin monks, established in 1862." A ruined Crusader church was noted.

In 1896 the population of El-kubebe was estimated to be about 144 persons.

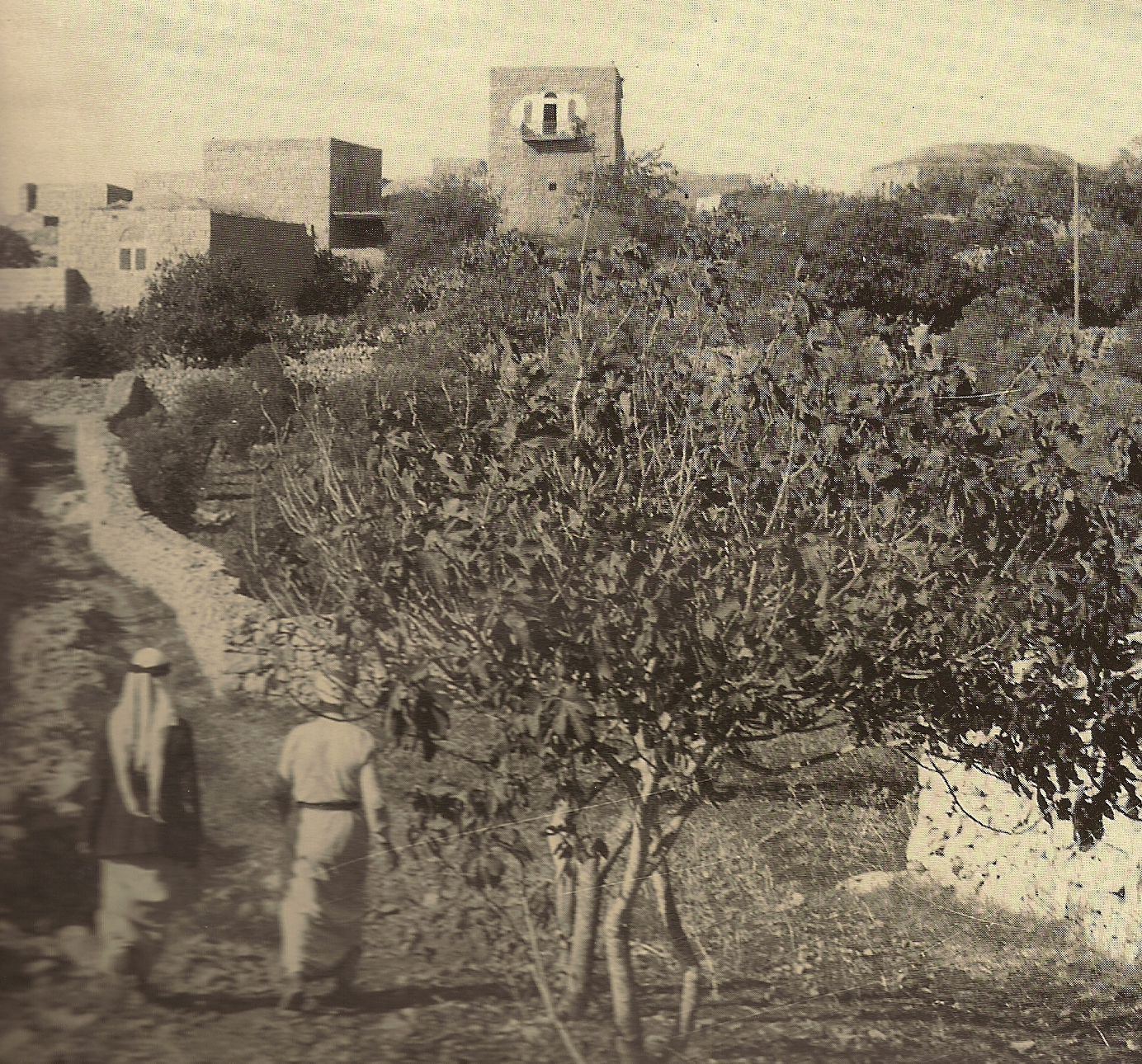
Al-Qubeiba during the British Mandate

=== British Mandate period ===
In the 1922 census of Palestine conducted by the British Mandate authorities, Al-Qubeiba had a population of 236 inhabitants, consisting of 26 Christians and 210 Muslims, where all the Christians were Roman Catholics. This had increased in the 1931 census to 316, 55 Christians and 261 Muslim, in 83 residential houses.

In the 1945 statistics Al-Qubeiba had a population of 420; 340 Muslims and 80 Christians, with 3,184 dunams of land, according to an official land and population survey. Of this, 534 dunams were plantations and irrigable land, 1,032 used for cereals, while 22 dunams were built-up land.

=== Jordanian period ===
In the wake of the 1948 Arab–Israeli War, and after the 1949 Armistice Agreements, Al-Qubeiba came under Jordanian rule. It was annexed by Jordan in 1950.

In 1961, the population of Qubeiba was 701, of whom 116 were Christian, the rest Muslim.

=== Post-1967 ===
Since the Six-Day War in 1967 Al-Qubeiba has been under Israeli occupation. The population in the 1967 census conducted by the Israeli authorities was 688, of whom 21 originated from the Israeli territory.

After the 1995 Oslo accords, 53.3% of village land was classified as Area B, and the remaining 46.2% as Area C. Israel has expropriated more than 500 dunams of village land in order to construct the West Bank barrier.

== Tourism ==
St. Cleophas Church is in Al-Qubeiba.

== Geopolitical status ==
Al-Qubeiba along with Beit Duqqu, Beit 'Anan, Beit Surik, Qatanna, Biddu, Beit Ijza, Kharayib Umm al-Lahim and at-Tira form the "Biddu enclave". The enclave is linked to Ramallah by underpasses and a road that is fenced on both sides. From the "Biddu enclave" Palestinians will travel along a fenced road that passes under a bypass road to Bir Nabala enclave, then on a second underpass under Bypass Road 443 to Ramallah.

Diaa' A-Din 'Abd al-Karim Ibrahim Abu 'Eid was shot dead by gunfire during an anti-barrier demonstration on 18 April 2004. Muhammad Fadel Hashem Rian and Zakaria Mahmoud 'Eid Salem were shot dead during anti-barrier demonstrations on 26 February 2004 at Beit Ijaz (a satellite village of Biddu).

== Health ==
The medical facilities for al-Qubeiba are classified as level 2 according to the Palestinian National Authority Ministry of Health.

== Bibliography ==
- Barron, J.B., ed. (1923). Palestine: Report and General Abstracts of the Census of 1922. Government of Palestine.
- Clermont-Ganneau, C.S. (1899). [ARP] Archaeological Researches in Palestine 1873-1874, translated from the French by J. McFarlane. Vol. 1. London: Palestine Exploration Fund. (pp. 475 ff)
- Conder, C.R.; Kitchener, H.H. (1883). The Survey of Western Palestine: Memoirs of the Topography, Orography, Hydrography, and Archaeology. Vol. 3. London: Committee of the Palestine Exploration Fund.
- Government of Jordan, Department of Statistics (1964). First Census of Population and Housing. Volume I: Final Tables; General Characteristics of the Population (PDF).
- Government of Palestine, Department of Statistics (1945). Village Statistics, April, 1945.
- Guérin, V. (1868). Description Géographique Historique et Archéologique de la Palestine (in French). Vol. 1: Judee, pt. 1. Paris: L'Imprimerie Nationale.
- Hadawi, S. (1970). Village Statistics of 1945: A Classification of Land and Area ownership in Palestine. Palestine Liberation Organization Research Center. Archived from the original on 2018-12-08.
- Hartmann, M. (1883). "Die Ortschaftenliste des Liwa Jerusalem in dem türkischen Staatskalender für Syrien auf das Jahr 1288 der Flucht (1871)". Zeitschrift des Deutschen Palästina-Vereins. 6: 102–149.
- Mills, E., ed. (1932). Census of Palestine 1931. Population of Villages, Towns and Administrative Areas. Jerusalem: Government of Palestine.
- Palmer, E.H. (1881). The Survey of Western Palestine: Arabic and English Name Lists Collected During the Survey by Lieutenants Conder and Kitchener, R. E. Transliterated and Explained by E.H. Palmer. Committee of the Palestine Exploration Fund.
- Pringle, D. (1993). The Churches of the Crusader Kingdom of Jerusalem: A-K (excluding Acre and Jerusalem). Vol. I. Cambridge University Press. ISBN 0-521-39036-2. (p. 8)
- Pringle, D. (1998). The Churches of the Crusader Kingdom of Jerusalem: L-Z (excluding Tyre). Vol. II. Cambridge University Press. ISBN 0-521-39037-0.
- Pringle, D. (2009). The Churches of the Crusader Kingdom of Jerusalem: The cities of Acre and Tyre with Addenda and Corrigenda to Volumes I-III. Vol. IV. Cambridge University Press. ISBN 978-0-521-85148-0. (p. 235)
- RHC Or: Recueil des historiens des croisades : Historiens orientaux (in French). Vol. 4. Paris: Imprimerie nationale. 1898. ( p. 323)
- Robinson, E.; Smith, E. (1841). Biblical Researches in Palestine, Mount Sinai and Arabia Petraea: A Journal of Travels in the year 1838. Vol. 3. Boston: Crocker & Brewster. (p. 65)
- Röhricht, R. (1893). (RRH) Regesta regni Hierosolymitani (MXCVII-MCCXCI) (in Latin). Berlin: Libraria Academica Wageriana.
- Röhricht, R. (1904). (RRH Ad) Regesta regni Hierosolymitani Additamentum (in Latin). Berlin: Libraria Academica Wageriana.
- Schick, C. (1896). "Zur Einwohnerzahl des Bezirks Jerusalem". Zeitschrift des Deutschen Palästina-Vereins. 19: 120–127.
- Socin, A. (1879). "Alphabetisches Verzeichniss von Ortschaften des Paschalik Jerusalem". Zeitschrift des Deutschen Palästina-Vereins. 2: 135–163.
