= At-Tira (Ramallah) =

- Municipality type D (Village council)

Arabic transcription(s)
  - Arabic: الطيرة
- Location of At-Tira (Ramallah) within Palestine
- Coordinates: 31°52′11″N 35°07′26″E
- Palestine grid: 161/141
- State: State of Palestine
- Governorate: Ramallah and al-Bireh

Government
  - Type: Village council
- Elevation: 623 m (2,044 ft)

Population (2017)
  - Total: 1,504
- Name meaning: the fort

At-Tira (Arabic: الطيرة) is a Palestinian village in the Ramallah and al-Bireh Governorate in the northern West Bank.

== Location ==
At Tira is located 8.3 kilometers (5.2 mi) southwest of Ramallah. It is bordered by Beituniya to the east and north, Beit 'Ur al Fauqa to the north and west, Beit ‘Anan to the west, and Beit Duqqu to the south.

== History ==
=== Ottoman period ===
==== Establishment ====
At-Tira was not mentioned in the 16th century. It was settled later by migrants from Dura. Residents of At-Tira, along with residents in nearby villages in the Ramallah Governorate such as Beit 'Anan, Beit Ur al-Fauqa, and Dura al-Qar', trace their ancestry to the town of Dura, southwest of Hebron.

==== 19th century ====
In 1838, in the Ottoman era, it was noted as a Muslim village, located in the Beni Malik district, west of Jerusalem.

In 1883, the PEF's Survey of Western Palestine (SWP) described Tireh as: "A small hamlet on a ridge, with a large sacred tree to the north-east (Sheikh Hasan), and a spring ('Ain Jufna) in the valley to the south-west."

By the beginning of the 20th century, residents from Tira settled al-Kunayyisa near al-Ramla, establishing it as a dependency – or satellite village – of their home village.

=== British Mandate ===
In the 1922 census of Palestine, conducted by the British Mandate authorities, Al Tireh had a population of 257 Muslims, increasing slightly in the 1931 census to 265 Muslims, in 71 houses in Et Tira.

In the 1945 statistics, the population of Et Tira was 330 Muslims, while the total land area was 3,968 dunams, according to an official land and population survey. Of this, 193 dunums were used for plantations and irrigable land, 1,974 for cereals, while 23 dunams were classified as built-up areas.

=== Jordanian rule ===
In the wake of the 1948 Arab–Israeli War, and after the 1949 Armistice Agreements, At-Tira came under Jordanian rule.

The Jordanian census of 1961 found 534 inhabitants in Tira.

=== 1967–present ===
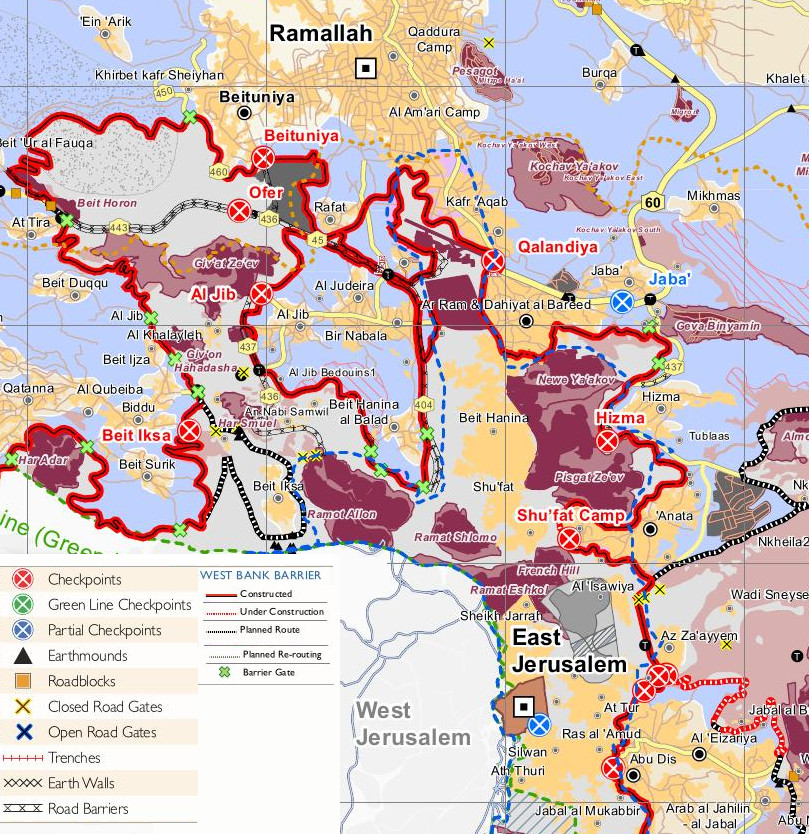
The barrier in northern Jerusalem, with the "Biddu enclave" to the left

Since the Six-Day War in 1967, At-Tira came under Israeli occupation.

After the 1995 accords, 10.4% of village land was classified as Area B, while the remaining 89.6% was classified as Area C. Israel has confiscated a total of 67 dunams of land from the village to construct the Israeli settlement of Beit Horon.

At-Tira, along with 9 other Palestinian villages, Beit Duqqu, Beit 'Anan, Beit Surik, Qatanna, al-Qubeiba, Beit Ijza, Kharayib Umm al Lahimand and Biddu form the "Biddu enclave" which, according to Tanya Reinhart, are imprisoned behind a wall, cut off from their orchards and farmlands that are being seized to form the real estate reserves of the Jerusalem Corridor and to create a territorial continuity with Giv'at Ze'ev. The enclave will be linked to Ramallah by underpasses and a road that is fenced on both sides. From the "Biddu enclave" Palestinians will travel along a fenced road that passes under a bypass road to Bir Nabala enclave, then on a second underpass under Bypass Road 443 to Ramallah.

== Bibliography ==
- Barron, J.B., ed. (1923). Palestine: Report and General Abstracts of the Census of 1922. Government of Palestine.
- Conder, C.R.; Kitchener, H.H. (1883). The Survey of Western Palestine: Memoirs of the Topography, Orography, Hydrography, and Archaeology. Vol. 3. London: Committee of the Palestine Exploration Fund.
- Government of Jordan, Department of Statistics (1964). First Census of Population and Housing. Volume I: Final Tables; General Characteristics of the Population (PDF).
- Government of Palestine, Department of Statistics (1945). Village Statistics, April, 1945.
- Mills, E., ed. (1932). Census of Palestine 1931. Population of Villages, Towns and Administrative Areas. Jerusalem: Government of Palestine.
- Palmer, E.H. (1881). The Survey of Western Palestine: Arabic and English Name Lists Collected During the Survey by Lieutenants Conder and Kitchener, R. E. Transliterated and Explained by E.H. Palmer. Committee of the Palestine Exploration Fund.
- Reinhart, T. (2006). The Road Map to Nowhere: Israel/Palestine Since 2003. London; New York: Verso. ISBN 1-84467-076-7.
- Robinson, E.; Smith, E. (1841). Biblical Researches in Palestine, Mount Sinai and Arabia Petraea: A Journal of Travels in the year 1838. Vol. 3. Boston: Crocker & Brewster.
