= Beit Surik =

- Municipality type D (Village council)

Arabic transcription(s)
  - Arabic: بيت سوريك
  - Latin: Beit Surik (official); Beit Sourik (unofficial)
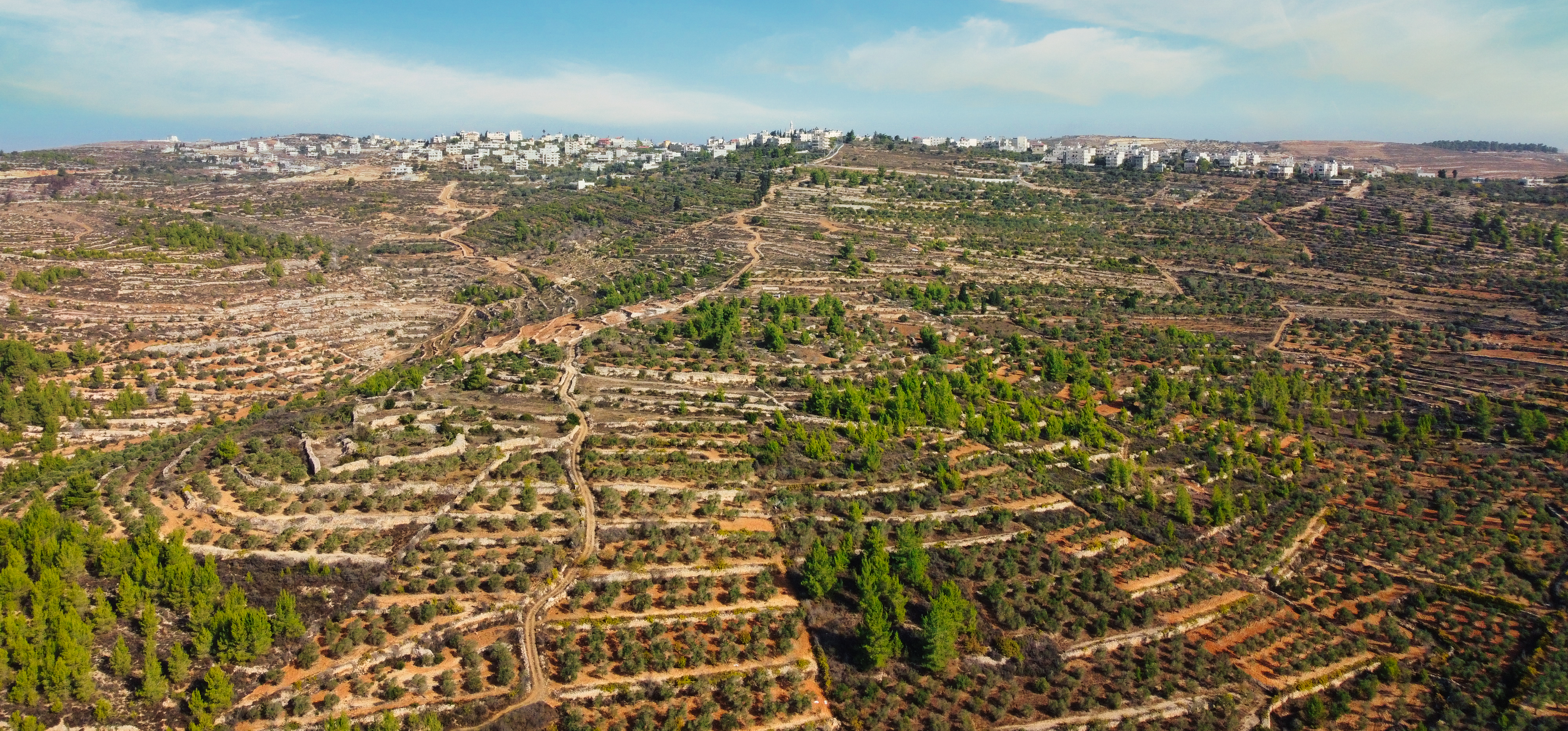
- Beit Surik and its fields

- Location of Beit Surik within Palestine Location of Beit Surik within the West Bank
- Coordinates: 31°49′28″N 35°08′55″E
- Palestine grid: 164/136
- State: State of Palestine
- Governorate: Quds

Government
  - Type: Village council

Population (2017)
  - Total: 4,025
- Name meaning: "The house of Surik"

Beit Surik (Arabic: بيت سوريك) is a Palestinian village in the Jerusalem Governorate, located 12 kilometers Northwest of Jerusalem in the northern West Bank. According to the Palestinian Central Bureau of Statistics, the town had a population of 4,025 in 2017.

== Location ==
Beit Surik is located 9.3 kilometers (5.8 mi) (horizontally) north-west of Jerusalem. It is bordered by Beit Iksa to the east, Biddu to the north, Qatanna to the west, and Qalunya to the south.

== History ==
Beit Surik is situated on an ancient site on top of a hill. Fragments of Corinthian columns have been found, and a mosaic floor, with dedicatory inscription in Greek and tabula ansata was excavated in part by LH Vincent in 1901.

The village was known as Beit Surie in the Crusader era. It was one of 21 villages given by King Godfrey as a fief to the canons of the Holy Sepulchre. The village was also mentioned in Crusader sources in the years 1152 and later. By 1169, "Latin" (that is, Christian) settlers seems to have been established there. As typical Arab-names also appear in the Crusader sources about Beit Surik, it has been suggested that Crusaders settled in a Muslim village.

=== Ottoman era ===
The village was incorporated into the Ottoman Empire in 1517 with all of Palestine, and in 1596 it appeared in the tax registers as being in the located in the Nahiye of Jerusalem in the Sanjak of the Mutasarrifate of Jerusalem. It had a population of 21 households, all Muslim. The inhabitants of the village paid a fixed tax-rate of 33.3% on wheat, barley, olive trees, vineyards, fruit trees, grape syrup, molasse, and goats and/or beehives, a total of 2,000 Akçe.

In 1738 Richard Pococke noted the village, Bethsurick, as he passed between Biddu (Bedou) and Beit Surik.

In 1838 Beit Surik was noted as a Muslim village, located in the Beni Malik district, west of Jerusalem.

In 1863, the French explorer Victor Guérin noticed there a "beautiful piece of antique wall", with several layers, formed of large stones.

An official Ottoman village list of about 1870 showed that "Bet Surik" had a total of 32 houses and a population of 125, though the population count included only the men.

In 1883, the PEF's Survey of Western Palestine described Beit Surik as a "small stone village on a hill-top. To the east in a flat valley is a spring with lemon and other trees. The place appears to be ancient, having rock-cut tombs near the spring."

In 1896 the population of Bet Surik was estimated to be about 264 persons.

By the beginning of the 20th century, residents from Beit Surik settled Beit Shanna near al-Ramla, establishing it as a dependency – or satellite village – of their home village.

=== British Mandate era ===
A shrine for Sheikh 'Abd el-'Aziz near Beit Surik was damaged during the fighting in WWI.

In the 1922 census of Palestine conducted by the British Mandate authorities, Bait Suriq had a total population of 352; all Muslims, increasing in the 1931 census to 432 Muslims, with 87 houses.

In the 1945 statistics the population was 480 Muslims, while the total land area was 6,879 dunams, according to an official land and population survey. Of this, 581 were allocated for plantations and irrigable land, 1,827 for cereals, while 33 dunams were classified as built-up (urban) areas.

=== Jordanian era ===
Many women and children were moved from Qastal to Beit Surik at the end of March, 1948. On 15 April 1948, Nahshon HQ issued a series of specific orders: Battalion 2 was ordered ‘to attack with the aim of annihilation and destruction and arson [litkof bimegamat hashmada veheres vehatzata]’ the village of Beit Suriq.

On the night of 19 April 1948 the village was attacked by the Palmach. The attacking force was commanded by Yosef Tabenkin, based in Jerusalem. They were later to become the Harel Brigade of the Israeli army. The village was surrounded by five companies with ambushes being set on the roads to Ramallah, Nabi Samuel and Biddu. A group consisting of armoured cars, a Davidka, reserves and the operation's HQ approached from Jerusalem. The company approaching from Castel encountered a group of around 30 armed men leaving Beit Surik heading east but did not engage them. A short mortar barrage was launched on the village from the east. When one of the ambush groups was fired on they attacked and took the school building. The village was taken soon afterwards with the attackers only encountering sparse rifle fire. Three platoons went through the village clearing enemy positions while a detachment of sappers began demolishing buildings. Some of the brigade then went on to capture Biddu before daybreak. They left Beit Surik largely or partly destroyed. Before withdrawing from Beit Surik, a special unit contaminated the village wells with a biological warfare agent consisting of typhus and diphtheria bacteria, to hinder attempts by villagers to return to their homes.

In the wake of the 1948 Arab–Israeli War, and after the 1949 Armistice Agreements, Beit Surik came under Jordanian rule.

The Jordanian census of 1961 found 954 inhabitants in Beit Surik.

=== post-1967 ===
Since Six-Day War in 1967, Beit Surik has been under Israeli occupation.

In 1986 the Israeli settlement of Har Adar was built. 456 dunums of land was confiscated from Beit Surik by the Israeli government for that purpose.

After the 1995 accords, 10.3% of the village land was classified as Area B, while the remaining 89.7% was classified as Area C.

On the morning of 26 September 2017, a Palestinian gunman from Beit Surik opened fire, shot Israeli security guards at a checkpoint in Har Adar, killing three and wounding one.

== Enclave ==
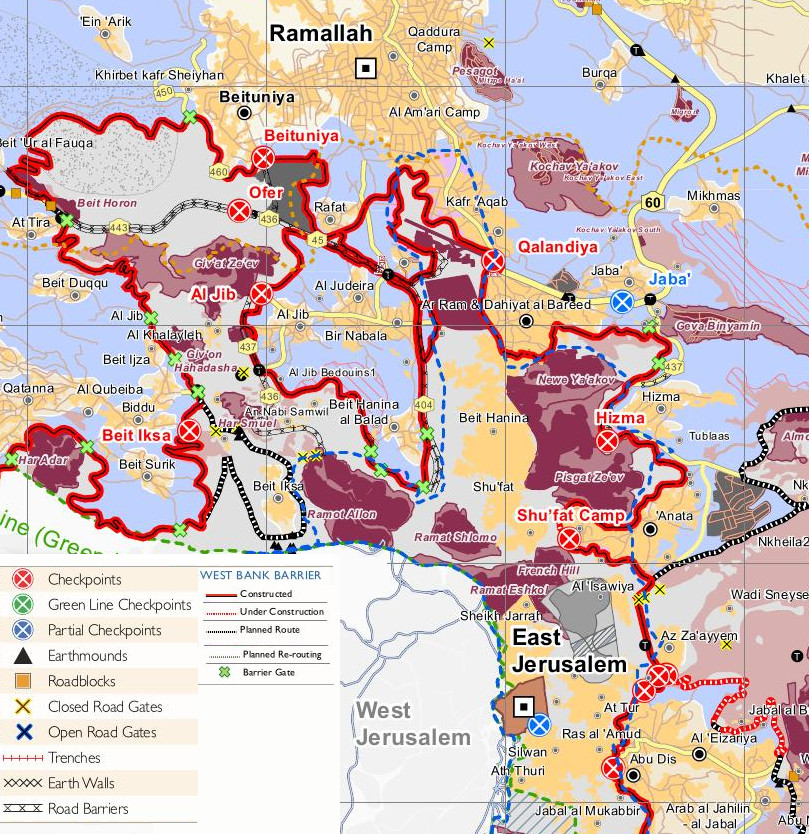
The barrier in northern Jerusalem, with the "Biddu enclave" to the left

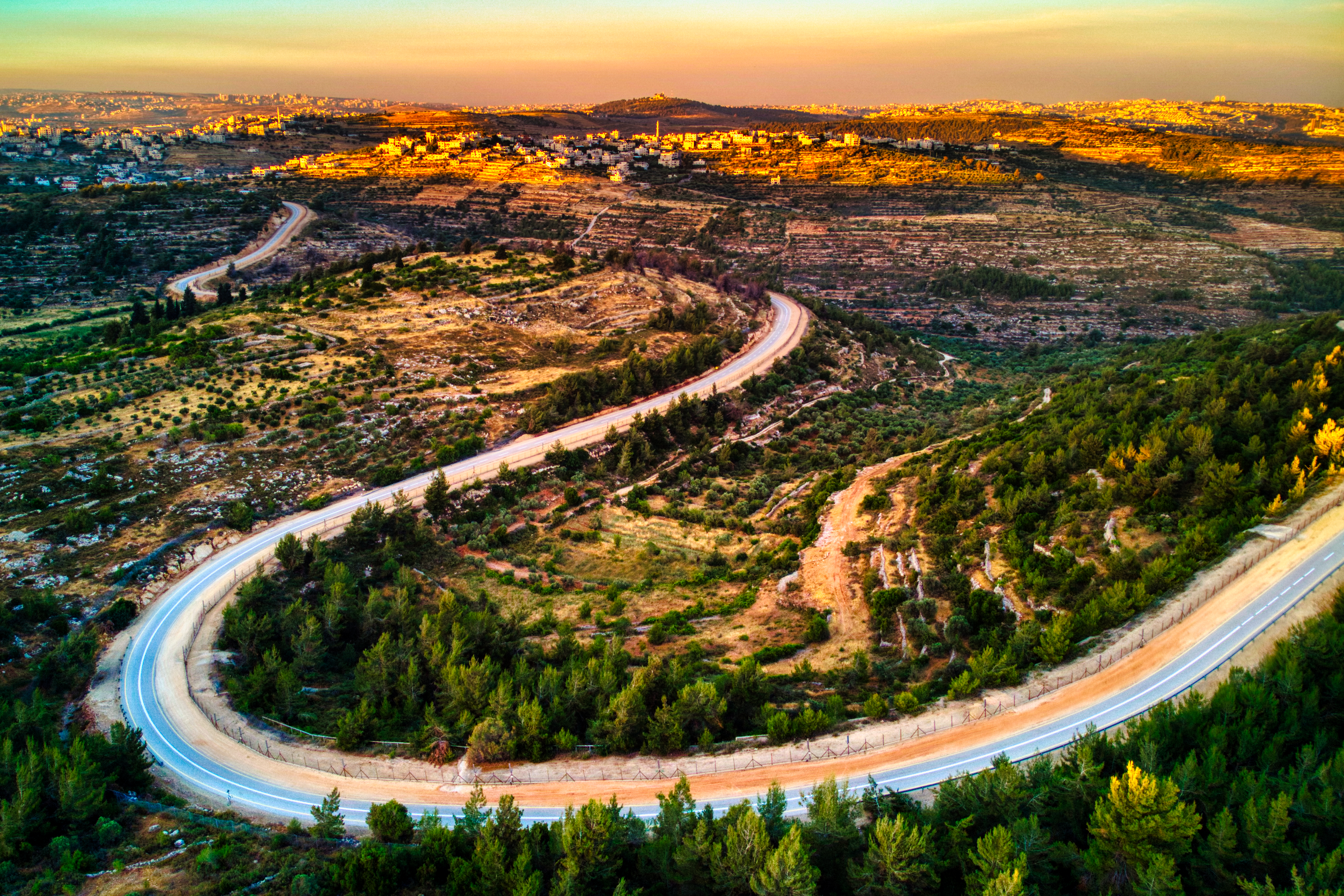
The Israeli West Bank barrier and Beit Surik behind it

Beit Surik along with Biddu, Beit Duqqu, Beit 'Anan, Qatanna, al Qubeida, Beit Ijza, Kharayib Umm al Lahimand and at Tira form the "Biddu enclave". The enclave will be linked to Ramallah by underpasses and a road that is fenced on both sides. From the "Biddu enclave" Palestinians will travel along a fenced road that passes under a bypass road to Bir Nabala enclave, then on a second underpass under Bypass Road 443 to Ramallah. A week before the International Court of Justice gave its Advisory Opinion, the High Court of Israel gave a ruling on a 40-kilometre strip of the Wall in which it held that, while Israel as the Occupying Power had the right to construct the Wall to ensure security and that substantial sections of the Wall imposed undue hardships on Palestinians and had to be re-routed. From "The Beit Sourik Case (HCJ 2056/04)" of 30 June 2004 the standards of proportionality between Israeli security and the injury to the Palestinian residents was set by the judgement of the Supreme Court of Israel. The "Barrier" that Israel is presently constructing within the Palestinian territory was held by the International court to be contrary to international law by the International Court of Justice on 9 July 2004. The International Court held that Israel is under an obligation to discontinue building the Wall and to dismantle it forthwith. In its Advisory Opinion, the Court dismissed a number of legal arguments raised by Israel relating to the applicability of humanitarian law and human rights law. In particular the International court held that Israeli settlements were unlawful. The Israeli Government then announced that it will not comply with the Advisory Opinion of the International Court of Justice. The Israeli Government has indicated that it will abide by the ruling of its own High Court in respect of sections of the Wall still to be built but not in respect of completed sections of the Wall. Protesting villagers have said: "The wall of death kills our daily life. It separates us from our villages and farms".

== Folklore ==
Tawfiq Canaan related in 1927 the story of Telah, a local wali.

On the village's eastern edge stands the tomb-shrine of ash-Sheikh Derwish. Local tradition suggest that ash-Sheikh Derwish posthumously opposed the idea of a dome over his grave. Repeated attempts by villagers to construct a dome were met with unexplained failure; structures erected were found dismantled by the following day, resulting in a site consistently left in disrepair. This series of events eventually led to the abandonment of the dome project, in a collective decision that respected what was perceived as the saint's wishes.

== Bibliography ==
- Allon, Y. (1970). The Making of Israel's Army. London: Vallentine, Mitchell. ISBN 0-853-03027-8.
- Barron, J. B., ed. (1923). Palestine: Report and General Abstracts of the Census of 1922. Government of Palestine.
- Canaan, T. (1927). Mohammedan Saints and Sanctuaries in Palestine. London: Luzac & Co.
- Conder, C.R.; Kitchener, H.H. (1883). The Survey of Western Palestine: Memoirs of the Topography, Orography, Hydrography, and Archaeology. Vol. 3. London: Committee of the Palestine Exploration Fund.
- Dauphin, C. (1998). La Palestine byzantine, Peuplement et Populations. BAR International Series 726 (in French). Vol. III : Catalogue. Oxford: Archeopress. ISBN 0-860549-05-4.
- Ellenblum, R. (2003). Frankish Rural Settlement in the Latin Kingdom of Jerusalem. Cambridge University Press. ISBN 9780521521871.
- Government of Jordan, Department of Statistics (1964). First Census of Population and Housing. Volume I: Final Tables; General Characteristics of the Population (PDF).
- Government of Palestine, Department of Statistics (1945). Village Statistics, April, 1945.
- Guérin, V. (1868). Description Géographique Historique et Archéologique de la Palestine (in French). Vol. 1: Judee, pt. 1. Paris: L'Imprimerie Nationale.
- Hadawi, S. (1970). Village Statistics of 1945: A Classification of Land and Area ownership in Palestine. Palestine Liberation Organization Research Center.
- Hartmann, M. (1883). "Die Ortschaftenliste des Liwa Jerusalem in dem türkischen Staatskalender für Syrien auf das Jahr 1288 der Flucht (1871)". Zeitschrift des Deutschen Palästina-Vereins. 6: 102–149.
- Hütteroth, W.-D.; Abdulfattah, K. (1977). Historical Geography of Palestine, Transjordan and Southern Syria in the Late 16th Century. Erlanger Geographische Arbeiten, Sonderband 5. Erlangen, Germany: Vorstand der Fränkischen Geographischen Gesellschaft. ISBN 3-920405-41-2.
- Mills, E., ed. (1932). Census of Palestine 1931. Population of Villages, Towns and Administrative Areas. Jerusalem: Government of Palestine.
- Morris, B. (1987). The Birth of the Palestinian refugee problem, 1947–1949. Cambridge University Press. ISBN 0-521-33028-9.
- Morris, B. (2004). The Birth of the Palestinian Refugee Problem Revisited. Cambridge University Press. ISBN 978-0-521-00967-6.
- Palmer, E. H. (1881). The Survey of Western Palestine: Arabic and English Name Lists Collected During the Survey by Lieutenants Conder and Kitchener, R. E. Transliterated and Explained by E.H. Palmer. Committee of the Palestine Exploration Fund.
- Pococke, R. (1745). A description of the East, and some other countries. Vol. 2. London: Printed for the author, by W. Bowyer.
- Pringle, D. (1993). The Churches of the Crusader Kingdom of Jerusalem: A-K (excluding Acre and Jerusalem). Cambridge University Press. ISBN 0-521-39036-2.
- Pringle, D. (2009). The Churches of the Crusader Kingdom of Jerusalem: The cities of Acre and Tyre with Addenda and Corrigenda to Volumes I-III. Vol. IV. Cambridge University Press. ISBN 978-0-521-85148-0. (p. 235)
- Robinson, E.; Smith, E. (1841). Biblical Researches in Palestine, Mount Sinai and Arabia Petraea: A Journal of Travels in the year 1838. Vol. 3. Boston: Crocker & Brewster.
- Röhricht, R. (1893). (RRH) Regesta regni Hierosolymitani (MXCVII-MCCXCI) (in Latin). Berlin: Libraria Academica Wageriana.
- Röhricht, R. (1904). (RRH Ad) Regesta regni Hierosolymitani Additamentum (in Latin). Berlin: Libraria Academica Wageriana.
- de Roziére, E., ed. (1849). Cartulaire de l'église du Saint Sépulchre de Jérusalem: publié d'après les manuscrits du Vatican (in Latin and French). Paris: Imprimerie nationale.
- Schick, C. (1896). "Zur Einwohnerzahl des Bezirks Jerusalem". Zeitschrift des Deutschen Palästina-Vereins. 19: 120–127.
- Socin, A. (1879). "Alphabetisches Verzeichniss von Ortschaften des Paschalik Jerusalem". Zeitschrift des Deutschen Palästina-Vereins. 2: 135–163.
- Toledano, E. (1984). "The Sanjaq of Jerusalem in the Sixteenth Century: Aspects of Topography and Population". Archivum Ottomanicum. 9: 279–319. Archived from the original on 2016-03-05.
