= Beit 'Anan =

- Municipality type C

Arabic transcription(s)
  - Arabic: بيت عنان
  - Latin: Bayt I'nan (official)
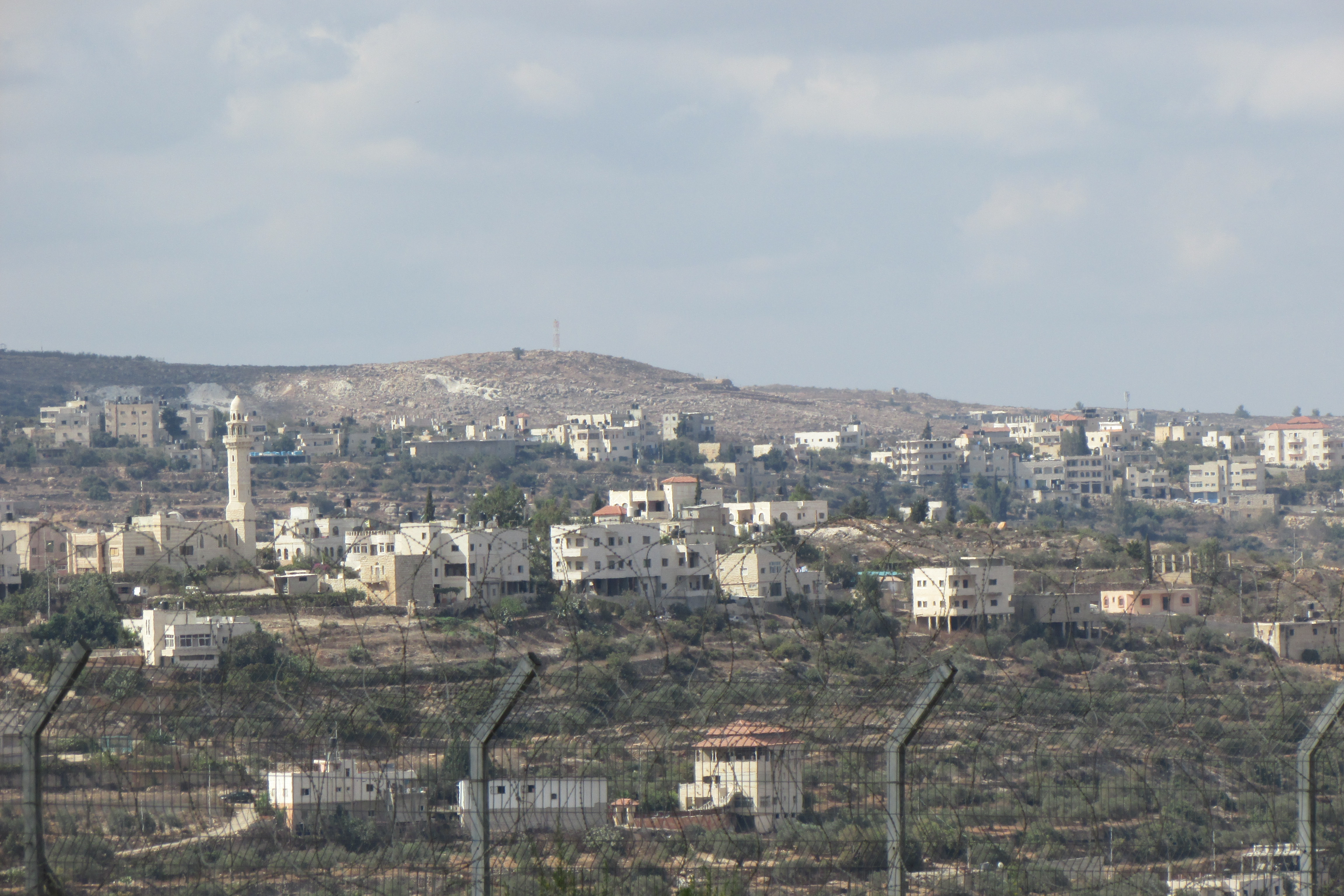

- Location of Beit 'Anan within Palestine
- Coordinates: 31°51′10″N 35°06′38″E
- Palestine grid: 160/140
- State: State of Palestine
- Governorate: Quds

Government
  - Type: Municipality

Population (2017)
  - Total: 4,210
- Name meaning: "The house of 'Anan"

Beit 'Anan (Arabic: بيت عنان) is a Palestinian village in the Quds Governorate, located northwest of Jerusalem. In 2017, it had a population of 4,210. Some residents of Beit 'Anan hold Israeli identity cards, while others hold Palestinian identity cards.

== History ==
In 1159, Bethanam is mentioned in Crusader sources in connection with defining the borders between it and Parva Mahomeria.

In 1883 the Survey of Western Palestine suggested that Beit 'Anan was identical with the Crusader village of Beithumen, a fief of the Holy Sepulchre in the twelfth century. In 1887 Röhricht thought it was a more likely that Beitunia was Beithumen, and in 1890 Conder agreed fully with Röhricht.

=== Ottoman era ===
Beit 'Anan was incorporated into the Ottoman Empire in 1517 with all of Palestine, and in 1596 it appeared in the tax registers as being in the Nahiya of Quds of the Liwa of Quds. It had a population of 28 households, all Muslim, who paid a fixed tax sum of 3,400 akçe.

Around 1740 Richard Pococke saw Beit 'Anan after travelling from Nabi Samwil.

In 1838 it was noted as a Muslim village, located in the Beni Malik area, west of Jerusalem.

In 1863 Victor Guérin visited the village, and estimated that it had 600 inhabitants, while an official Ottoman village list of about 1870 showed that "Bet 'Anan" had 59 houses and a population of 220, though the population count included only men. In 1883, the PEF's Survey of Western Palestine (SWP) described the village as "a small village on top of a flat ridge; near a main road to the west are remains of a Khan with water, and about a mile to the east is a spring."

In 1896 the population of Beit 'Anan was estimated to be about 450 persons.

By the beginning of the 20th century residents from Beit Anan settled Ajanjul near al-Ramla, establishing it as a dependency – or satellite village – of their home village.

=== British Mandate era ===
Beit 'Anan was captured by British forces in the 1917 Battle for Jerusalem during their campaign in Palestine against the Ottomans. It was described as a village situated on the hill commanding Dukka from the south, on the road to Kubeibeh, identified as ancient Emmaus.

In the 1922 census of Palestine conducted by the British Mandate authorities, "Bait 'Inan" had a population of 509 Muslims, increasing in the 1931 census to a population of 654 Muslims, in 162 houses.

In the 1945 statistics Beit I'nan had a population of 820, all Muslims, with 10,105 dunams of land, according to an official land and population survey. Of this, 2,015 dunams were plantations and irrigable land, 2,471 used for cereals, while 63 dunams were built-up (urban) land.

=== Jordanian era ===
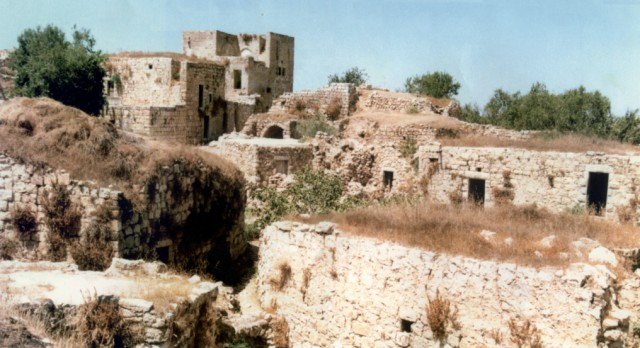
Old Beit 'Anan

In the wake of the 1948 Arab–Israeli War, and after the 1949 Armistice Agreements, Beit 'Anan came under Jordanian rule. It was annexed by Jordan in 1950.

In 1961 the population of Beit I'nan was 1,255.

=== Post-1967 ===
Since the Six-Day War in 1967 Beit 'Anan has been under Israeli occupation. The population of Beit Inan in the 1967 census conducted by the Israeli authorities was 1,261, of whom 212 originated from the Israeli territory.

After the 1995 accords about 12.9% of the land (or 1,309 dunams) was classified as Area B, and the remaining 87.1% (or 8,797 dunams) as Area C.

As of 2012, the Israeli plans for the Separation Wall would isolate a total of 1,009 dunams of village land on, or behind the wall, out of reach for its Palestinian owners.

==== Biddu enclave ====
Beit 'Anan along with Biddu, Beit Duqqu, Beit Surik, Qatanna, al Qubeida, Beit Ijza, Kharayib Umm al Lahim and at Tira form the "Biddu enclave." The enclave will be linked to Ramallah by underpasses and a fenced road.

==== West Bank barrier ====
In July 2004, the Israeli High Court of Justice cancelled military orders for the confiscation of hundreds of dunams of village land to build the separation barrier. The barrier would have passed close to Beit 'Anan and cut off the village from a lot of its land. Following the ruling, the barrier was rerouted at a greater distance from the village.

== Demography ==
Residents of Beit 'Anan, along with residents in nearby villages in the Ramallah Governorate such as At-Tira, Beit Ur al-Fauqa, and Dura al-Qar', trace back their ancestry to the town of Dura, southwest of Hebron.

Families in the village include the Jumhoor, Rabee' and Hmeid families. Tsvi Misinai reports that within the Rabee' clan, there is a tradition of lighting Shabbat lamps on Friday evening using olive oil and wicks, a practice inherited, uncommonly, through paternal lineage. Additionally, the clan uses the first name Zadoc and observes the custom of reciting Tefilat HaDerech, a Jewish prayer for safe travel, before going on a journey.

== Education and culture ==
Beit 'Anan has an UNRWA school for girls with 560 students, two elementary schools for boys and three kindergartens. The Abu Ayob al-Ansary mosque is located in Beit 'Anan. The village has two health clinics and several sports clubs. In 2009, a four-day culture festival was held in Beit Anan and was attended by more than 15,000 people.

== Shrine of Abu Yamin ==
Abu Yamin (Arabic: أبو يمين), or a-Naby Yamin, is a shrine located in Beit 'Anan. It is situated inside a cemetery dedicated to a saint of the same name and houses the tombs of this saint, his son, and his grandson, who according to local legend was gifted with foresight. More of his descendants' tombs surround the location. Tradition holds that Abu Yamin had Egyptian origins and it is said he appeared wearing a green crown. The residents of the village consider him to be the village's founding father. He was allegedly seen floating above the village to the sound of a band of musicians. According to local tradition, Abu Yamin's descendants were a people chosen by Allah.

== Bibliography ==
- Barron, J. B., ed. (1923). Palestine: Report and General Abstracts of the Census of 1922. Government of Palestine.
- Conder, C.R.; Kitchener, H. H. (1883). The Survey of Western Palestine: Memoirs of the Topography, Orography, Hydrography, and Archaeology. Vol. 3. London: Committee of the Palestine Exploration Fund.
- Conder, C. R. (1890). "Norman Palestine". Quarterly Statement – Palestine Exploration Fund. 22: 29–37.
- Government of Jordan, Department of Statistics (1964). First Census of Population and Housing. Volume I: Final Tables; General Characteristics of the Population (PDF).
- Government of Palestine, Department of Statistics (1945). Village Statistics, April, 1945.
- Guérin, V. (1868). Description Géographique Historique et Archéologique de la Palestine (in French). Vol. 1: Judee, pt. 1. Paris: L'Imprimerie Nationale.
- Hadawi, S. (1970). Village Statistics of 1945: A Classification of Land and Area ownership in Palestine. Palestine Liberation Organization Research Centre.
- Hartmann, M. (1883). "Die Ortschaftenliste des Liwa Jerusalem in dem türkischen Staatskalender für Syrien auf das Jahr 1288 der Flucht (1871)". Zeitschrift des Deutschen Palästina-Vereins. 6: 102–149.
- Hütteroth, W.-D.; Abdulfattah, K. (1977). Historical Geography of Palestine, Transjordan and Southern Syria in the Late 16th Century. Erlanger Geographische Arbeiten, Sonderband 5. Erlangen, Germany: Vorstand der Fränkischen Geographischen Gesellschaft. ISBN 3-920405-41-2.
- Mills, E., ed. (1932). Census of Palestine 1931. Population of Villages, Towns and Administrative Areas. Jerusalem: Government of Palestine.
- Palmer, E. H. (1881). The Survey of Western Palestine: Arabic and English Name Lists Collected During the Survey by Lieutenants Conder and Kitchener, R. E. Transliterated and Explained by E.H. Palmer. Committee of the Palestine Exploration Fund.
- Pococke, R. (1745). A description of the East, and some other countries. Vol. 2. London: Printed for the author, by W. Bowyer.
- Pringle, D. (1998). The Churches of the Crusader Kingdom of Jerusalem: L-Z (excluding Tyre). Vol. II. Cambridge University Press. ISBN 0521390370.
- Robinson, E.; Smith, E. (1841). Biblical Researches in Palestine, Mount Sinai and Arabia Petraea: A Journal of Travels in the year 1838. Vol. 3. Boston: Crocker & Brewster.
- Röhricht, R. (1887). "Studien zur mittelalterlichen Geographie und Topographie Syriens". Zeitschrift des Deutschen Palästina-Vereins. 10: 195–344.
- Röhricht, R. (1893). (RRH) Regesta regni Hierosolymitani (MXCVII-MCCXCI) (in Latin). Berlin: Libraria Academica Wageriana.
- Schick, C. (1896). "Zur Einwohnerzahl des Bezirks Jerusalem". Zeitschrift des Deutschen Palästina-Vereins. 19: 120–127.
- Socin, A. (1879). "Alphabetisches Verzeichniss von Ortschaften des Paschalik Jerusalem". Zeitschrift des Deutschen Palästina-Vereins. 2: 135–163.
