= Qatanna =

- Municipality type C

Arabic transcription(s)
  - Arabic: قطنّه
  - Latin: Qatanaa (official); Qatna (unofficial)
- Location of Qatanna within Palestine Qatanna (the West Bank)
- Coordinates: 31°50′6″N 35°7′20″E
- Palestine grid: 160/136
- State: State of Palestine
- Governorate: Quds

Government
  - Type: Municipality

Area
  - Total: 3.6 km^{2} (1.4 sq mi)

Population (2017)
  - Total: 6,981
  - Density: 1,900/km^{2} (5,000/sq mi)
- Name meaning: p.n.; confer Heb קָטָן "little"

Qatanna (Arabic: قطنّه) is a Palestinian town in the central West Bank part of the Jerusalem Governorate, located 12 km. northwest of Jerusalem. According to the Palestinian Central Bureau of Statistics, the town had a population of 6,981 inhabitants in 2017. Primary health care for the town is level 2.

== Geography and land ==
Qatanna has an elevation of 650 meters above sea level. Nearby towns and villages include Biddu to the east and Beit Liqya to the north. Khirbet Kefireh is located just north of Qatanna.

== History ==
In the Roman and Byzantine periods, Qatanna was home to extensive settlement including agricultural institutions, roads, and many burial caves.

=== Ottoman era ===
Incorporated into the Ottoman Empire in 1517 with all of Palestine, Qatanna appeared in the 1596 Ottoman tax registers as being in the Nahiya of Quds of the Liwa of Quds. It had a population of 12 households, all Muslim, and paid taxes on wheat, barley, olives, occasional revenues, goats and/or beehives.

In 1838 Katunneh was noted as a Muslim village, part of Beni Malik district, located west of Jerusalem.

In 1863, the French explorer Victor Guérin found the village to have 250 inhabitants, while an Ottoman village list of about 1870 showed that Kattane had a population of 300, in 57 houses, though the population count included only men. It was also noted that it was located north of Abu Ghosh, in the Beni Malik district.

In 1883, the PEF's Survey of Western Palestine described it as a "small village in a deep, narrow, rocky valley, surrounded by fine groves of olives and vegetable gardens."

In 1896 the population of Katanne was estimated to be about 351 persons.

By the beginning of the 20th century, residents from Qatanna settled Khirbat al-Buwayra, establishing it as a dependency – or satellite village – of their home village.

=== British Mandate era ===
In the 1922 census of Palestine conducted by the British Mandate authorities, Qatanneh had a population 633, all Muslims. In the 1931 census it was counted with Nitaf, together they had 875 Muslim inhabitants, in 233 houses.

In the 1945 statistics Qatanna had a population of 1,150, all Muslims, with 9,464 dunams of land, according to an official land and population survey. Of this, 1,829 dunams were plantations and irrigable land, 1,603 used for cereals, while 32 dunams were built-up (urban) land.

=== Jordanian era ===
In the wake of the 1948 Arab–Israeli War, and after the 1949 Armistice Agreements, Qatanna came under Jordanian rule.

After the 1948 war, much of Qatanna's land area was designated as "no-man's land" forming a part of the Demilitarized Zone between the armistice lines of Israeli and Jordanian territory.

In the early 1950s, some people from Qatanna moved to Jerusalem after hearing about empty homes in the then-depopulated Jewish Quarter of the Old City, joining Palestinian refugees. As a result, although Qatanna itself was not occupied or depopulated in 1948, some of its residents now live in the Shu'fat Refugee Camp.

In 1961, the population of Qatanna was 1,897.

=== Post-1967 ===
Since the Six-Day War in 1967, Qatanna has been under Israeli occupation. The population in the 1967 census conducted by the Israeli authorities was 1,594, of whom 151 were refugees.

Currently, the town has a total land area of 3,555 dunams, of which 677 dunams are designated as built-up area. After the 1995 Interim Agreement on the West Bank and the Gaza Strip, civil administration of 716 dunams of Qatanna's land (including the built-up zone) was transferred to the Palestinian National Authority.

Qatanna contains three schools, three kindergartens, three clinics, a pharmacy and a medical center run by the Palestinian Red Crescent. There is also a sport's club and a women's center in the town. Qatanna is governed by a village council and Ramallah serves as the town's main urban provider. Four springs – al-Balad, as-Samra, an-Nimr and an-Namous – provide water for the town. The latter spring is completely isolated from the town by the Israeli West Bank barrier.

36 dunums were confiscated from Qatanna for the Israeli settlement of Har Adar, built in 1986.

==== Enclave ====
Qatanna along with Biddu, Beit Duqqu, Beit Surik, Beit 'Anan, al-Qubeiba, Beit Ijza, Kharayib Umm al Lahimand, and at-Tira form the "Biddu enclave". The enclave will be linked to Ramallah by underpasses and a road that is fenced on both sides. From the "Biddu enclave" Palestinians will travel along a fenced road that passes under a bypass road to Bir Nabala enclave, then on a second underpass under Bypass Road 443 to Ramallah.

== Demography ==
=== Local origins ===
As per local tradition, the residents of Qatanna are said to have originally come from Hebron, then lived in Marda, and eventually established themselves in Qatanna around the 18th century.

Both Mordechai Nisan and Tsvi Misinai cite stories that claim that although the people of Qatanna practice Islam today, they are originally of Jewish ancestry.

== See also ==
- Khirbet Kefireh

== Bibliography ==
- Barron, J.B., ed. (1923). Palestine: Report and General Abstracts of the Census of 1922. Government of Palestine.
- Conder, C.R.; Kitchener, H.H. (1883). The Survey of Western Palestine: Memoirs of the Topography, Orography, Hydrography, and Archaeology. Vol. 3. London: Committee of the Palestine Exploration Fund.
- Government of Jordan, Department of Statistics (1964). First Census of Population and Housing. Volume I: Final Tables; General Characteristics of the Population (PDF).
- Government of Palestine, Department of Statistics (1945). Village Statistics, April, 1945.
- Guérin, V. (1868). Description Géographique Historique et Archéologique de la Palestine (in French). Vol. 1: Judee, pt. 1. Paris: L'Imprimerie Nationale.
- Hadawi, S. (1970). Village Statistics of 1945: A Classification of Land and Area ownership in Palestine. Palestine Liberation Organization Research Center.
- Hartmann, M. (1883). "Die Ortschaftenliste des Liwa Jerusalem in dem türkischen Staatskalender für Syrien auf das Jahr 1288 der Flucht (1871)". Zeitschrift des Deutschen Palästina-Vereins. 6: 102–149.
- Hütteroth, W.-D.; Abdulfattah, K. (1977). Historical Geography of Palestine, Transjordan and Southern Syria in the Late 16th Century. Erlanger Geographische Arbeiten, Sonderband 5. Erlangen, Germany: Vorstand der Fränkischen Geographischen Gesellschaft. ISBN 3-920405-41-2.
- Mills, E., ed. (1932). Census of Palestine 1931. Population of Villages, Towns and Administrative Areas. Jerusalem: Government of Palestine.
- Nagorsky, Alla (2008-04-15). "Nahal Kefira, Survey" (120). Hadashot Arkheologiyot – Excavations and Surveys in Israel.
- Palmer, E.H. (1881). The Survey of Western Palestine: Arabic and English Name Lists Collected During the Survey by Lieutenants Conder and Kitchener, R. E. Transliterated and Explained by E.H. Palmer. Committee of the Palestine Exploration Fund.
- Robinson, E.; Smith, E. (1841). Biblical Researches in Palestine, Mount Sinai and Arabia Petraea: A Journal of Travels in the year 1838. Vol. 3. Boston: Crocker & Brewster.
- Schick, C. (1896). "Zur Einwohnerzahl des Bezirks Jerusalem". Zeitschrift des Deutschen Palästina-Vereins. 19: 120–127.
- Socin, A. (1879). "Alphabetisches Verzeichniss von Ortschaften des Paschalik Jerusalem". Zeitschrift des Deutschen Palästina-Vereins. 2: 135–163.
