= Beit Duqqu =

Municipality type D in Jerusalem

- Municipality type D (Village council)

Arabic transcription(s)
  - Arabic: بيت دقّو
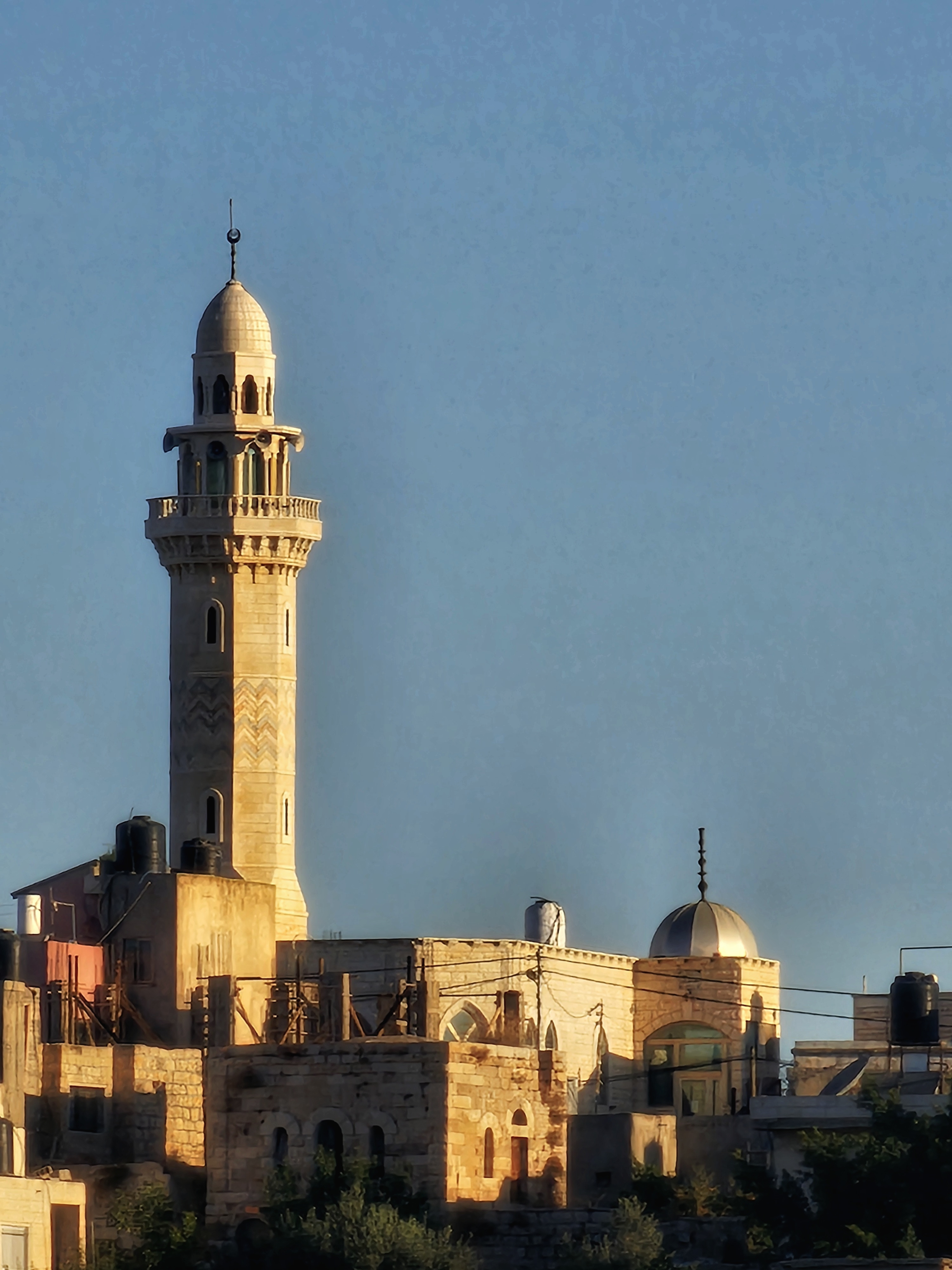
- Beit Duqqu

- Location of Beit Duqqu within Palestine
- Coordinates: 31°51′33″N 35°07′43″E
- Palestine grid: 162/140
- State: State of Palestine
- Governorate: Quds

Government
  - Type: Village council
- Elevation: 664 m (2,178 ft)

Population (2017)
  - Total: 1,754
- Name meaning: The house of Dukku

Beit Duqqu (Arabic: بيت دقّو) is a Palestinian village in the Jerusalem Governorate, located northwest of Jerusalem in the central West Bank. According to the Palestinian Central Bureau of Statistics, the town had a population of 1,754 in 2017.

== Location ==
Beit Duqqu is located (horizontally) 12.9 kilometers (8.0 mi) north-west of Jerusalem. It is bordered by Beit 'Anan to the east, At Tira to the north, Beit Ijza and Al Jib to the west, and Al Qubeiba to the south.

== History ==
Local residents believe that their ancestors arrived in the early 14th century in Beit Duqqu from the village of Umm Walad, in the south of Syria. Villagers belong to the families of Badr, Ali Hussein, Rayyan, Morrar, Dawood and Muslih.

=== Ottoman era ===
In 1517, the village was included in the Ottoman Empire with the rest of Palestine and in the 1596 tax-records it appeared as Bayt Duqqu, located in the Nahiya of Jabal Quds of the Liwa of Al-Quds. The population was 3 households, all Muslim. They paid a tax rate of 33.3% on agricultural products, which included wheat, barley, olive and fruit trees, goats and beehives in addition to "occasional revenues"; a total of 2,730 Akçe.

In 1838, it was noted as a Muslim village, located in the Beni Malik district, west of Jerusalem.

In 1870, Guérin described it as a "small village, situated on the top of a high hill." Socin found from an official Ottoman village list from about the same year (1870) that Beit Duqqu had a population of 125, with a total of 36 houses, though the population count only included men.

In 1883, the PEF's Survey of Western Palestine (SWP) described it as "A village of moderate size, standing high on a ridge, with a spring to the north-west and olives to the north. This was also a fief like [Beit 'Anan]."

In 1896, the population of Bet dukku was estimated to be about 114 persons.

=== British Mandate era ===
In the 1922 census of Palestine conducted by the British Mandate authorities, Bait Duqu had a population of 254, all Muslims, increasing in the 1931 census to 328 Muslims, in 84 inhabited houses.

In the 1945 statistics Beit Duqqu had a population of 420 Muslims, with 5,393 dunams of land, according to an official land and population survey. Of this, 1,610 dunams were plantations and irrigable land, 1,767 used for cereals, while 27 dunams were built-up (urban) land.

=== Jordanian era ===
In the wake of the 1948 Arab–Israeli War, and after the 1949 Armistice Agreements, Beit Duqqu came under Jordanian rule.

In 1961, the population of Beit Duqqu was 537.

=== Post-1967 ===
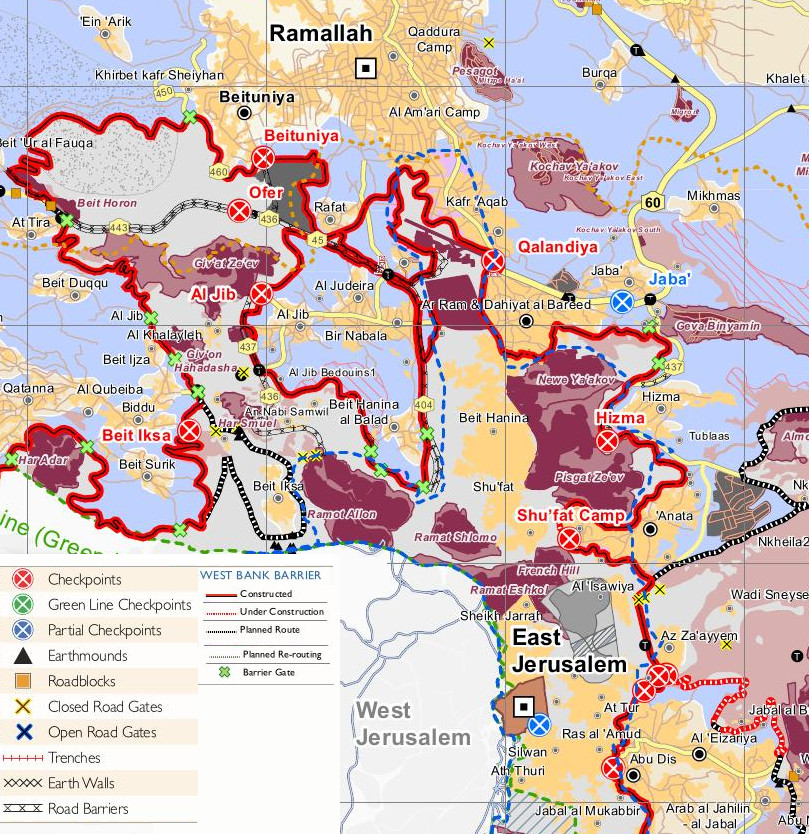
The barrier in northern Jerusalem, with the "Biddu enclave" to the left

Since the Six-Day War in 1967, Beit Duqqu has been under Israeli occupation. The population in the 1967 census conducted by the Israeli authorities was 438, of whom 16 were refugees.

After the 1995 accords, 10.6% of village land was classified as Area B, while the remaining 89.4% was classified as Area C. Israel has expropriated land from Beit Duqqu for the construction of the Israeli settlement Giv’at Ze’ev.

Beit Duqqu along with 9 other Palestinian villages, Biddu, Beit 'Anan, Beit Surik, Qatanna, al-Qubeiba, Beit Ijza, Kharayib Umm al Lahimand and at Tira form the "Biddu enclave" which, according to Tanya Reinhart, are "imprisoned" behind a wall, cut off from their orchards and farmlands that are being seized in order to form the real estate reserves of the Jerusalem Corridor and to create a territorial continuity with Giv'at Ze'ev. The enclave will be linked to Ramallah by underpasses and a road that is fenced on both sides. From the "Biddu enclave" Palestinians will travel along a fenced road that passes under a bypass road to Bir Nabala enclave, then on a second underpass under Bypass 443 to Ramallah.

The main source of living is agriculture, mainly of apricots, olives and grapes.

== Bibliography ==
- Barron, J. B., ed. (1923). Palestine: Report and General Abstracts of the Census of 1922. Government of Palestine.
- Conder, C.R.; Kitchener, H.H. (1883). The Survey of Western Palestine: Memoirs of the Topography, Orography, Hydrography, and Archaeology. Vol. 3. London: Committee of the Palestine Exploration Fund.
- Government of Jordan, Department of Statistics (1964). First Census of Population and Housing. Volume I: Final Tables; General Characteristics of the Population (PDF).
- Government of Palestine, Department of Statistics (1945). Village Statistics, April, 1945.
- Guérin, V. (1875). Description Géographique Historique et Archéologique de la Palestine (in French). Vol. 2: Samarie, pt. 2. Paris: L'Imprimerie Nationale.
- Hadawi, S. (1970). Village Statistics of 1945: A Classification of Land and Area ownership in Palestine. Palestine Liberation Organization Research Centre.
- Hartmann, M. (1883). "Die Ortschaftenliste des Liwa Jerusalem in dem türkischen Staatskalender für Syrien auf das Jahr 1288 der Flucht (1871)". Zeitschrift des Deutschen Palästina-Vereins. 6: 102–149.
- Hütteroth, W.-D.; Abdulfattah, K. (1977). Historical Geography of Palestine, Transjordan and Southern Syria in the Late 16th Century. Erlanger Geographische Arbeiten, Sonderband 5. Erlangen, Germany: Vorstand der Fränkischen Geographischen Gesellschaft. ISBN 3-920405-41-2.
- Mills, E., ed. (1932). Census of Palestine 1931. Population of Villages, Towns and Administrative Areas. Jerusalem: Government of Palestine.
- Palmer, E. H. (1881). The Survey of Western Palestine: Arabic and English Name Lists Collected During the Survey by Lieutenants Conder and Kitchener, R. E. Transliterated and Explained by E.H. Palmer. Committee of the Palestine Exploration Fund.
- Reinhart, T. (2006). The Road Map to Nowhere: Israel/Palestine Since 2003. London; New York: Verso. ISBN 1-84467-076-7.
- Robinson, E.; Smith, E. (1841). Biblical Researches in Palestine, Mount Sinai and Arabia Petraea: A Journal of Travels in the year 1838. Vol. 2. Boston: Crocker & Brewster.
- Robinson, E.; Smith, E. (1841). Biblical Researches in Palestine, Mount Sinai and Arabia Petraea: A Journal of Travels in the year 1838. Vol. 3. Boston: Crocker & Brewster.
- Schick, C. (1896). "Zur Einwohnerzahl des Bezirks Jerusalem". Zeitschrift des Deutschen Palästina-Vereins. 19: 120–127.
- Socin, A. (1879). "Alphabetisches Verzeichniss von Ortschaften des Paschalik Jerusalem". Zeitschrift des Deutschen Palästina-Vereins. 2: 135–163.
