= Biddu, Jerusalem =

Palestinian village in Jerusalem Governate, West Bank

Biddu
- Municipality type C

Arabic transcription(s)
  - Arabic: بِدّو
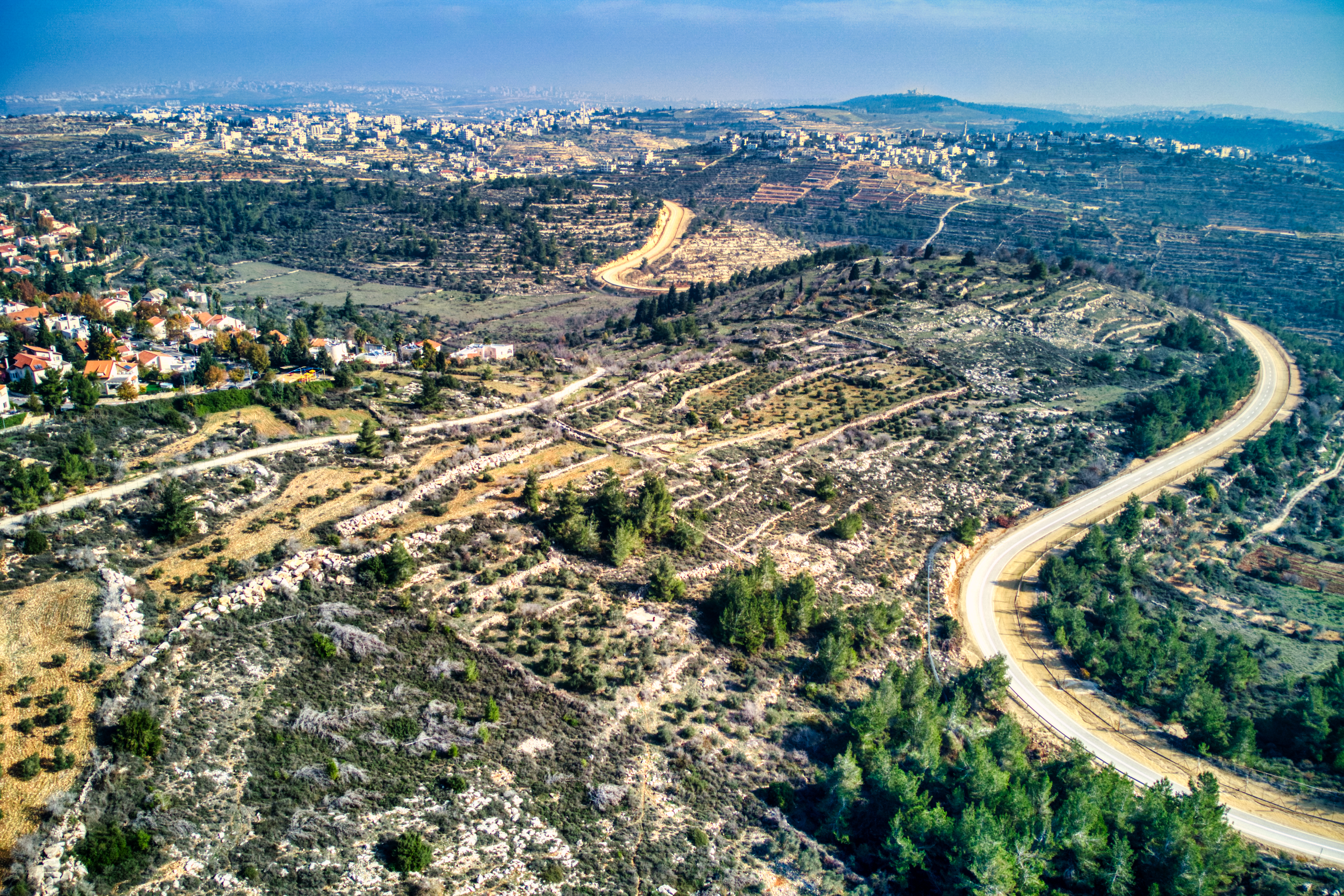
- Biddu

- Location of Biddu within Palestine Biddu (the West Bank)
- Coordinates: 31°50′02″N 35°08′43″E
- Palestine grid: 164/137
- State: State of Palestine
- Governorate: Quds

Government
  - Type: Municipality
- Elevation: 837 m (2,746 ft)

Population (2017)
  - Total: 8,231
- Name meaning: "Biddu", personal name

Biddu (Arabic: بدّو) is a Palestinian town in the Jerusalem Governorate, located 6 kilometers northwest of Jerusalem in the West Bank. According to the Palestinian Central Bureau of Statistics, the town had a population of 8,231 in 2017. Biddu is at an altitude of 806m to 834m. Giv'on HaHadasha lies 2 km east of Biddu.

Biddu is located (horizontally) 10.1 kilometers (6.3 mi) north-west of Jerusalem. It is bordered by Beit Iksa to the east, Beit Ijza to the north, Al Qubeiba to the west, and Beit Surik to the south.

== History ==
According to Roy Marom, the name derives from the Semitic root b.d.d.

Bellarmino Bagatti saw several buildings he dated to the 12th century. Southwest of the village centre was the wali of Sheikh Abu Talal, possibly built on the ruins of a Crusader church.

Northeast of the village is Horvat Diab, an archaeological site containing the remains of a Jewish farmhouse or estate of the Second Temple period, along with rock-cut tombs in the kokhim style, and the ruins of a public structure that may have been a synagogue.

=== Ottoman era ===
In the Ottoman tax records of the 1500s, Biddu was located in the nahiya of Jerusalem.

In 1738 Richard Pococke records passing by the village, which was near Beit Surik.

In 1838 Edward Robinson described it as a Muslim village in the Beni Malik area, west of Jerusalem.

In May 1863 Victor Guérin described Biddou as sitting on a high plateau. He said there were 150 inhabitants and some of the houses seemed very old.

Albert Socin, citing an official Ottoman village list compiled around 1870, noted that Biddu had 70 houses and a population of 247, although this count included only men. He saw a cistern carved in the rock. The Crusader road from Ramle to Nabi Samwil ran through the village. Martin Hartman counted 71 houses.

In 1883 the PEF's Survey of Western Palestine described it as a moderate sized village on a rocky hill with a well in the northeast.

In 1896 the population of Biddu was estimated to be about 546 persons.

By the beginning of the 20th century, residents from Biddu settled Salbit near al-Ramla, establishing it as a dependency – or satellite village – of their home village.

=== British Mandate era ===
In the 1922 census of Palestine conducted by the British Mandate authorities, Biddu had a population 252, all Muslims. This had increased in the 1931 census to 399, still all Muslim, in 88 houses.

In the 1945 statistics the population of Biddu consisted of 520 Muslims and the land area was 5,392 dunams, according to an official land and population survey. Of this, 334 dunams were designated for plantations and irrigable land, 2,258 for cereals, while 19 dunams were built-up (urban) areas.

=== Jordanian era ===
On the night of 19 April 1948 the village was attacked by the Palmach. The attacking force was commanded by Yosef Tabenkin, based in Jerusalem. They were later to become the Harel Brigade of the Israeli army. The attack came from Beit Surik which had been captured earlier that night. Biddu was subjected to a short bombardment from a Davidka after which Palmach sappers entered the village and demolished its houses, and effectively stripped it of its inhabitants. Before withdrawing from both Biddu and Beit Surik, under Moshe Dayan's direction, a special unit contaminated the villages' wells with a biological warfare agent consisting of typhus and diphtheria bacteria. The purpose of such poisoning was to make Palestinian villages that had conquered but not yet occupied uninhabitable to residents seeking to return to their homes.

In the wake of the 1948 Arab–Israeli War, and after the 1949 Armistice Agreements, Biddu came under Jordanian rule from 1948 until 1967.

In 1961, the population of Biddu was 1,444.

=== Post-1967 ===
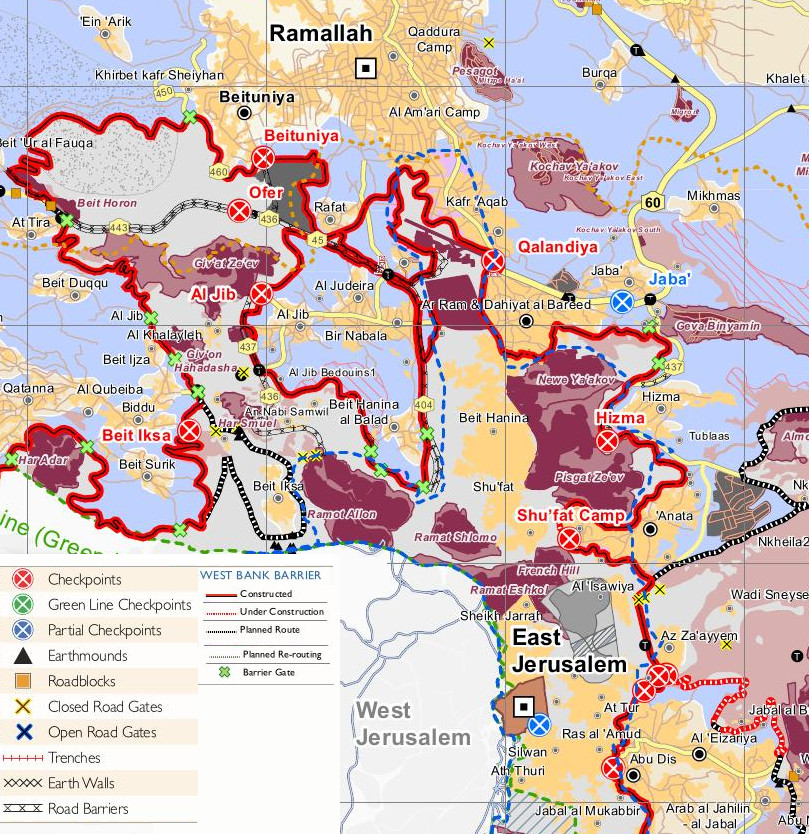
The barrier in northern Jerusalem, with the "Biddu enclave" to the left

Since the Six-Day War in 1967, Biddu has been under Israeli occupation. The population in the 1967 census conducted by the Israeli authorities was 1,259, of whom 567 originated from Israeli territory.

After the 1995 accords, 24.8% of Biddu's land was classified as Area B, the remaining 75.2% as Area C.

Israel has confiscated about 627 dunams of Biddus land for the Israeli settlement of Har Adar (Giv’at HaRadar), and 186 dunams for Giv’on Ha’hadasha.

==== Enclave ====
Biddu along with 9 other Palestinian villages, Beit Duqqu, Beit 'Anan, Beit Surik, Qatanna, al-Qubeiba, Beit Ijza, Kharayib Umm al Lahimand and at Tira form the "Biddu enclave" which, according to Tanya Reinhart, are imprisoned behind a wall, cut off from their orchards and farmlands that are being seized to form the real estate reserves of the Jerusalem Corridor and to create a territorial continuity with Giv'at Ze'ev. The enclave will be linked to Ramallah by underpasses and a road that is fenced on both sides. From the "Biddu enclave" Palestinians will travel along a fenced road that passes under a bypass road to Bir Nabala enclave, then on a second underpass under Bypass Road 443 to Ramallah.

In 2004, initially peaceful demonstrations against the separation barrier in Biddu turned violent when the IDF cleared the area. Biddu has become a focal point for non-violent resistance to the process of incorporating Palestinian lands into Israeli settlements. Biddu villagers promote the use of their bodies to hinder bulldozing of their terrain, and recourse to arms or violence is forbidden.

Attempts to have "women only" protests, to avoid conflict, have met with defeat. In one demonstration by Israeli and local women activists in April 2004, a protest by 70 women brandishing signs and singing was broken up by tear gas, stun grenades, and mounted police. Diaa' A-Din 'Abd al-Karim Ibrahim Abu 'Eid was shot dead by gunfire during an anti-barrier demonstration on 18 April 2004. Muhammad Fadel Hashem Rian and Zakaria Mahmoud 'Eid Salem were shot dead during anti-barrier demonstrations on 26 February 2004 at Beit Ijaz (a satellite village of Biddu).

== Bibliography ==
- Barron, J. B., ed. (1923). Palestine: Report and General Abstracts of the Census of 1922. Government of Palestine.
- Conder, C.R.; Kitchener, H. H. (1883). The Survey of Western Palestine: Memoirs of the Topography, Orography, Hydrography, and Archaeology. Vol. 3. London: Committee of the Palestine Exploration Fund.
- Government of Jordan, Department of Statistics (1964). First Census of Population and Housing. Volume I: Final Tables; General Characteristics of the Population (PDF).
- Government of Palestine, Department of Statistics (1945). Village Statistics, April, 1945.
- Guérin, V. (1868). Description Géographique Historique et Archéologique de la Palestine (in French). Vol. 1: Judee, pt. 1. Paris: L'Imprimerie Nationale.
- Hadawi, S. (1970). Village Statistics of 1945: A Classification of Land and Area ownership in Palestine. Palestine Liberation Organization Research Centre.
- Hartmann, M. (1883). "Die Ortschaftenliste des Liwa Jerusalem in dem türkischen Staatskalender für Syrien auf das Jahr 1288 der Flucht (1871)". Zeitschrift des Deutschen Palästina-Vereins. 6: 102–149.
- McCown, C. (1921). "Muslim Shrines in Palestine". Annual of the American Schools of Oriental Research. 2–3: 47–79. (pp. 57-59)
- Mills, E., ed. (1932). Census of Palestine 1931. Population of Villages, Towns and Administrative Areas. Jerusalem: Government of Palestine.
- Morris, B. (1987). The Birth of the Palestinian refugee problem, 1947–1949. Cambridge University Press. ISBN 0-521-33028-9.
- Morris, B. (2004). The Birth of the Palestinian Refugee Problem Revisited. Cambridge University Press. ISBN 978-0-521-00967-6.
- Palmer, E. H. (1881). The Survey of Western Palestine: Arabic and English Name Lists Collected During the Survey by Lieutenants Conder and Kitchener, R. E. Transliterated and Explained by E.H. Palmer. Committee of the Palestine Exploration Fund.
- Pococke, R. (1745). A description of the East, and some other countries. Vol. 2. London: Printed for the author, by W. Bowyer.
- Pringle, D. (1993). The Churches of the Crusader Kingdom of Jerusalem: Volume I A-K (excluding Acre and Jerusalem). Cambridge University Press. ISBN 0-521-39036-2.
- Pringle, D. (1997). Secular buildings in the Crusader Kingdom of Jerusalem: an archaeological Gazetteer. Cambridge University Press. ISBN 0521-46010-7.
- Reinhart, T. (2006). The Road Map to Nowhere: Israel/Palestine Since 2003. London; New York: Verso. ISBN 1-84467-076-7.
- Robinson, E.; Smith, E. (1841). Biblical Researches in Palestine, Mount Sinai and Arabia Petraea: A Journal of Travels in the year 1838. Vol. 2. Boston: Crocker & Brewster.
- Robinson, E.; Smith, E. (1841). Biblical Researches in Palestine, Mount Sinai and Arabia Petraea: A Journal of Travels in the year 1838. Vol. 3. Boston: Crocker & Brewster.
- Schick, C. (1896). "Zur Einwohnerzahl des Bezirks Jerusalem". Zeitschrift des Deutschen Palästina-Vereins. 19: 120–127.
- Socin, A. (1879). "Alphabetisches Verzeichniss von Ortschaften des Paschalik Jerusalem". Zeitschrift des Deutschen Palästina-Vereins. 2: 135–163.
- Toledano, E. (1984). "The Sanjaq of Jerusalem in the Sixteenth Century: Aspects of Topography and Population". Archivum Ottomanicum. 9: 279–319. Archived from the original on 2016-03-05.
