= Giv'on HaHadasha =

Israeli settlement in the West Bank

Giv'on HaHadasha: גבעון החדשה (Hebrew)
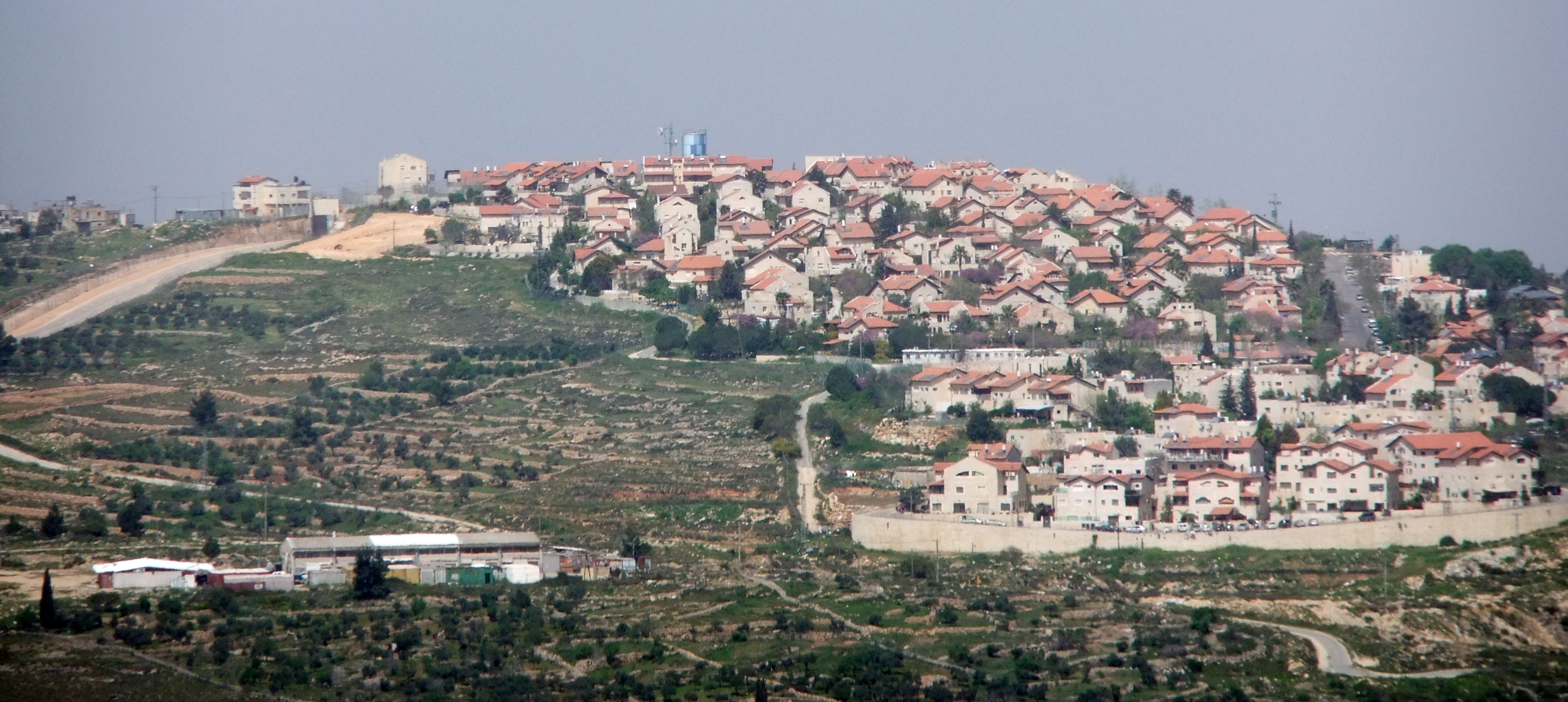
- Etymology: New Gibeon
- Location within the Central West Bank Location within the West Bank
- Coordinates: 31°50′55″N 35°9′27″E
- Country: Palestine
- District: Judea and Samaria Area
- Council: Mateh Binyamin
- Region: West Bank
- Affiliation: Amana
- Founded: 1895 (original); 1977 (modern)
- Founder: Immigrants from Yemen
- Population (2024): 1,171

Giv'on HaHadashah (Hebrew: גבעון החדשה, lit. 'New Gibeon') is an Israel settlement in the West Bank. Located near Giv'at Ze'ev, it falls under the jurisdiction of Mateh Binyamin Regional Council. In 2024 it had a population of 1,171.

The international community considers Israeli settlements in the West Bank illegal under international law, but the Israeli government disputes this.

== History ==
The settlement was originally established in 1895 by Yemenite Jews, but they left the location after a number of years. It was named after the biblical Gibeon, in Hebrew Giv'on (Joshua 10:10-12), situated nearby. The village was resettled in 1924, but its inhabitants fled as a result of the 1929 Palestine riots.

It was resettled again in 1977 by members of Gush Emunim. According to the ARIJ, the Israeli government eventually confiscated land from three nearby Palestinian villages in order to construct Giv'on HaHadasha roughly where the original Yemenite settlement's lands had been occupied:

- 186 dunams from Biddu,
- 159 dunams from Beit Ijza,
- 13 dunams from Al Jib.

The community eventually absorbed many Jewish emigrants from the former Soviet Union, as well as many Israeli-born Jews. Although it is mostly secular in character, it is also home to a few religiously observant families.
