= St. Cleophas Church =

Coordinates: 31.8404°N 35.1352°E

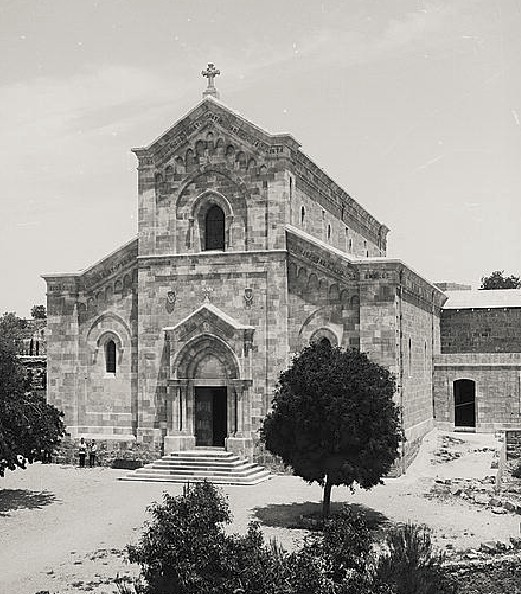
- The church in 1936
- St. Cleophas Church
- Location: El Qubeibeh
- Country: Palestine
- Denomination: Roman Catholic Church

The St. Cleophas Church or St. Cleopas Church also called Emmaus Church or the Basilica of St. Cleophas, is a Franciscan Catholic church located in the Palestinian village of Al-Qubeiba in the West Bank. The site is one of the three major candidates identified with Emmaus, where, according to the New Testament, Jesus revealed himself to two of his disciples shortly after his resurrection. About half a mile west of the church lies a Franciscan lodge.

== History ==
El-Qubeibeh, which had been part of the agricultural domain of the Church of the Holy Sepulchre, was first suggested as St Luke’s Emmaus in 1280. The village was on a Roman road and in 1099 the Crusaders discovered a Roman fortress there, which became known as Castellum Emmaus.

The site was adopted in 1335 by the Franciscans, who began an annual pilgrimage there. A three-aisled basilica with a vaulted choir and an apse was built on the supposed house of Cleophas, which might have been destroyed during the reign of Emperor Hadrian, before being rebuilt and destroyed again by the Persians in 616. The basilica was again demolished in 1187.

With the Crusaders expelled from the Holy Land, Christians in the following centuries were forbidden to use the main highway from the coastal plain to Jerusalem, denying them access to Abu Ghosh, who was accepted before as the place of Emmaus.

In the nineteenth century, the church was in ruins. The nave was almost destroyed and there was a wall three meters high instead of the apses. In 1852, the Franciscan Custody of the Holy Land renewed the annual pilgrimage on the Monday after Easter. The Marquise Pauline de Nicolay (de) bought the ruins in 1861 and donated them to the Franciscans.

In 1902, Sultan Abdul Hamid II gave permission to the order of the Franciscans to rebuild their church. The temple was awarded the status of minor basilica in 1919.

== See also ==
- Roman Catholicism in Palestine
- St. Cleopas

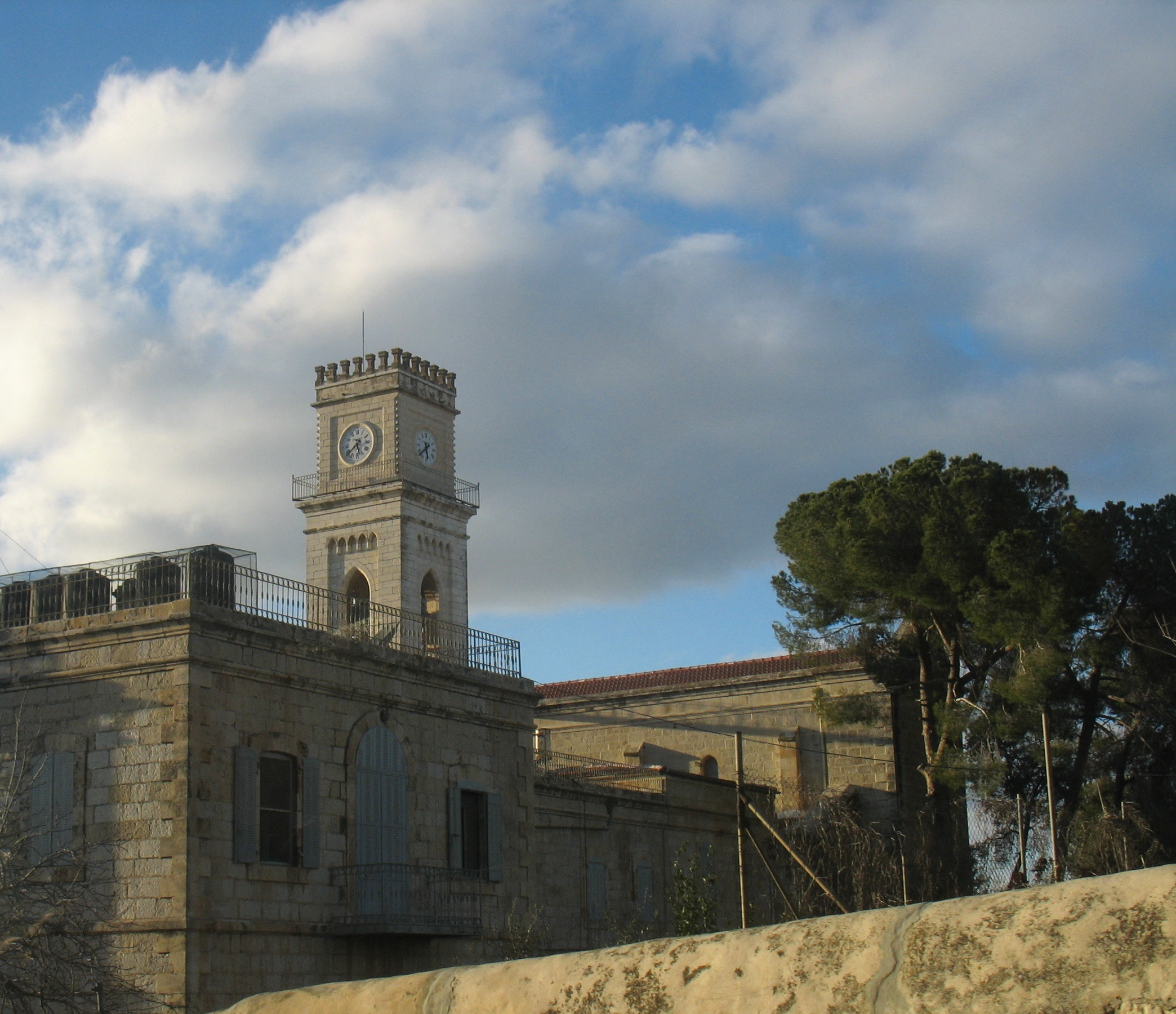
The church in 2012
