= Giv'at Ze'ev =

Illegal Israeli settlement in the West Bank

Coordinates: 31°51′51″N 35°10′11″E

Giv'at Ze'ev גִבְעַת זְאֵב
- City (from 2026)

Hebrew transcription(s)
  - ISO 259: Gibˁat Zˀeb
  - Also spelled: Givat Zeev (unofficial)
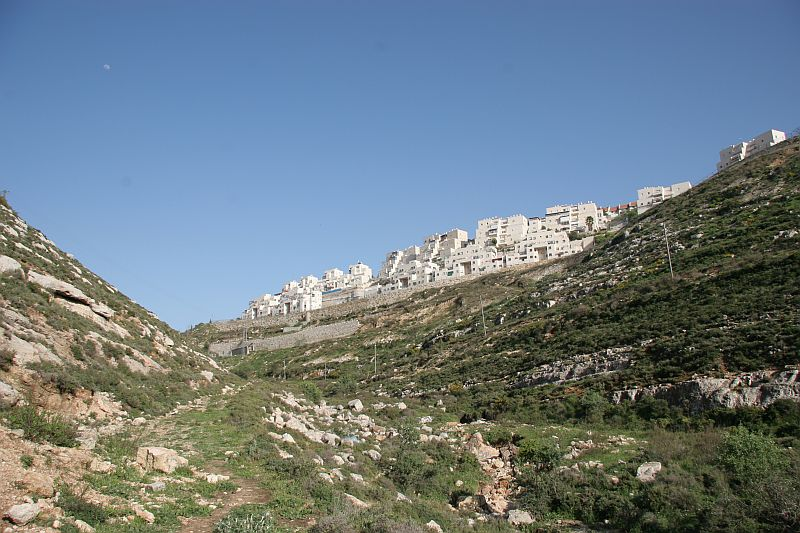
- View from the wadi
- Interactive map of Giv'at Ze'ev
- Location within the Central West Bank
- Region: West Bank
- District: Judea and Samaria Area
- Founded: 1977

Government
  - Head of Municipality: Yossi Avrahami

Area
  - Total: 4,841 dunams (4.841 km^{2}; 1.869 sq mi)

Population (2024)
  - Total: 25,104
  - Density: 5,186/km^{2} (13,430/sq mi)
- Name meaning: Zeev's Hill (also: Wolf Hill)
- Website: www.givat-zeev.muni.il (in Hebrew)

Giv'at Ze'ev (Hebrew: גִּבְעַת זְאֵב) is an urban Israeli settlement in the West Bank organized as a city council, five kilometers northwest of Jerusalem. The settlement was founded in 1977 on the site of the abandoned Jordanian military camp, adjacent to the site of ancient Gibeon. While it lies within the borders of the Matte Binyamin Regional Council, it is a separate municipal entity. In 2024 it had a population of 25,104.

The international community considers Israeli settlements in the West Bank illegal under international law, but the Israeli government disputes this.

== Description ==
According to the Applied Research Institute–Jerusalem, Israel has confiscated land from three nearby Palestinian villages to construct Giv'at Ze'ev:

- 2,246 dunams from Al Jib,
- 30 dunams from Beit Duqqu,
- 9 dunums from Beit Ijza,
- 1,036 dunams from Beitunia, for Giv'at Ze'ev and Beit Horon.

It was named after Ze'ev Jabotinsky, and declared a local council in 1983. Palestinians contend that under the expropriation maps contained in military orders, the road connecting it to Jerusalem, though ostensibly designed to "facilitate Palestinian movement", actually would confiscate 15 square kilometers of prime agricultural land, on which the livelihoods of 24,000 Palestinians depend to enable the programmed development of this settlement bloc.

In 1996 a program of expansion with new housing units and an envisaged 20,000 new settlers was approved, to be constructed on land confiscated from the Palestinian villages of Beitunia, Biddu, and Jib, in what Palestinians call Wadi Salman, but which the Israelis have renamed Ha'ayalot valley. Twice in successive years further areas amounting to 250 acres were confiscated from Beitunia and Jib to build an additional 11,550 units. On March 9, 2008, Prime Minister Ehud Olmert approved the construction of 750 new homes in Giv'at Ze'ev under the Agan Ha'ayalot project. This approval stands in contrast to Olmert's policy of freezing new permits for expansion within existing settlements. Olmert argued that the project was first approved in 1999, but stopped in 2000, as a result of the Second Intifada. The approval was criticized by the Palestinian Authority, US Secretary of State Condoleezza Rice, and the European Union. On the political right, the Shas party took credit for pressuring Olmert to approve the project.

Both the Ayelet HaShahar synagogue and yeshiva built on private Palestinian land owned by the Allatif family of the nearby Palestinian township of Jib, are slated to be demolished by March 2014, after the prosecutor's office determined that the putative documents of land purchase were forgeries.

Giv'at Ze'ev has four elementary schools and one junior high school. There are two youth movement branches: the Israeli Scouts (Arava tribe) and Bnei Akiva.

On July 12, 2026, Giv'at Ze'ev was officially granted the status of an Israeli city.

== Location ==
It is located just off Highway 443, affording easy access to both Jerusalem and the Tel Aviv area. It is connected to Jerusalem by Egged Ta'avura bus routes 131, 132, 133, 134 and to Tel Aviv by Egged bus number 471. The loop circling Giv'at Ze'ev effectively annexes over 18 square miles of Palestinian land. The town is patrolled by Mishmeret Ha'gvul and a local security force, and is secured by a security fence. Plans are underway to set a guard post near the entrance to route 443 (currently, the road is closed off by a security fence).

== Religious life ==
The religious population in mixed and includes Chardal, Dati Leumi, Charedi and Secular. There are about 20 orthodox synagogues in the town, with more expected to be built as the community expands.

Giv'at Ze'ev is the center of the Karlin-Stolin Chasidim and one of the town's most notable residents is the Stoliner Rebbe Boruch Yaakov Meir Shochet. There is also a Chabad Lubavitch community there as well.

== Ramat Givat Zeev ==
Ramat Givat Zeev is a new section that was being developed in 2013. The 400 housing units include both single-family houses and multi-family apartment buildings. The development is being marketed towards English-speaking religious Jews making Aliyah to Israel.

== Voting patterns ==
In the 2022 election, 87 percent of voters in Giv'at Ze'ev voted for the parties of the right-wing coalition led by Benjamin Netanyahu, while 11 percent voted for the parties of the center-left coalition led by Yair Lapid and 0.02 percent voted for the Arab parties. 45 percent of voters voted for the Haredi parties Shas or UTJ.

In the 2026 election, 86 percent of voters in Giv'at Ze'ev voted for the parties of the right-wing coalition led by Benjamin Netanyahu, while 9 percent voted for the parties of the center-left coalition led by Gadi Eisenkot and 0.05 percent voted for the Arab parties. An additional 1.3 percent voted for the Reservists, and 1.5 percent voted for Amcha Yisrael. 45 percent of voters voted for the Haredi parties Shas or UTJ. Voter turnout increased 18 percent from the 2022 election.

== See also ==
- Khirbet el-Lattatin
