= Tanya Reinhart =

Israeli journalist and linguist

- טניה ריינהרט
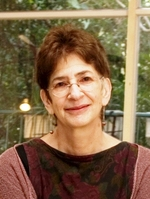
- Born: 1943; Haifa, Mandatory Palestine (now Israel)
- Died: 17 March 2007 (aged 63); New York City, United States
- Education: Massachusetts Institute of Technology (PhD)
- Occupations: Linguist; political activist
- Spouse: Aharon Shabtai

Tanya Reinhart (Hebrew: טניה ריינהרט; 1943 – 17 March 2007) was an Israeli linguist and political activist. A frequent writer on the Israeli–Palestinian conflict, she contributed columns to the Israeli centrist newspaper Yedioth Ahronoth and longer articles to the American left-wing magazines CounterPunch and ZNetwork and the global open publishing network Indymedia.

== Biography ==
Reinhart was born in Haifa in 1943 and was raised by her mother. She studied philosophy and Hebrew literature at the Hebrew University, Jerusalem as an undergraduate, where she later received an M.A. in comparative literature and philosophy. In 1976 she obtained a Ph.D. in linguistics from the Massachusetts Institute of Technology. Her thesis supervisor was Noam Chomsky. She was active in the Communist Youth League, following in the steps of her mother.

Reinhart was a professor of linguistics and literary theory at Tel-Aviv University. She taught at MIT, Columbia University, and the University of Paris, and was also a guest lecturer at Duke University. She maintained links with Utrecht University for 15 years. After losing her position at Tel Aviv University, a move she attributed to bureaucratic harassment, she decided to leave Israel. Before her death she also said that Israel's attack on Lebanon in 2006 and on the Gaza Strip also influenced her decision. On settling in the United States she was offered a teaching appointment as Global Distinguished Professor at New York University (NYU).

She died of a stroke in her sleep on 17 March 2007, in New York City. She was 63 years old. Reinhart was married to the Hebrew-language poet Aharon Shabtai, and is buried in Israel.

== Professional work ==
Reinhart specialized in the interface and relations between meaning and context, syntax and sound systems. Noam Chomsky has described her contributions to the field of linguistics as "original and highly influential," particularly regarding "syntactic structure and operations, referential dependence, principles of lexical semantics and their implications for syntactic organization, unified approaches to cross-linguistic semantic interpretation of complex structures that appear superficially to vary widely, the theory of stress and intonation, efficient parsing systems, the interaction of internal computations with thought and sensorimotor systems, optimal design as a core principle of language, and much else."

Reinhart's academic work also extended well beyond linguistics, to that of literary theory, mass media, propaganda, and other core elements of intellectual culture. Chomsky has noted Reinhart's activism was not limited to words and that she was often on "the front line of direct resistance to intolerable actions, an organizer and a participant, a stance that one cannot respect too highly." Commenting on her death, he wrote that Reinhart would be remembered "not only as a resolute and honorable defender of the rights of Palestinians, but also as one of those who have struggled to defend the moral integrity of her own Israeli society, and its hope for decent survival."

== Political activism ==
Reinhart was an outspoken critic both of Israel's invasion and occupation of Lebanon and its occupation of the Palestinian territories after 1967, the latter of which she came to regard as worse than Apartheid. She was active in organizing solidarity campaigns with her Palestinian colleagues at Bir Zeit University. Her position was that Israel should abandon the West Bank and Gaza:

Israel should withdraw immediately from the territories occupied in 1967. The bulk of Israeli settlers (150,000 of them) are concentrated in the big settlement blocks in the center of the West bank. These areas cannot be evacuated over night. But the rest of the land (about 90%–96% of the West bank and the whole of the Gaza strip) can be evacuated immediately. Many of the residents of the isolated Israeli settlements that are scattered in these areas are speaking openly in the Israeli media about their wish to leave. It is only necessary to offer them reasonable compensation for the property they will be leaving behind. The rest — the hard-core "land redemptions" fanatics — are a negligible minority that will have to accept the will of the majority.

Reinhart pointed out that immediate withdrawal would still leave under debate between six and ten percent of the West Bank with the large settlement blocks, as well as the issues of Jerusalem and the right of return, and maintains that these should be the subject of "serious peace negotiations".

In 2002, Reinhart was heavily criticized in Israel for signing a European petition calling for a moratorium on European support of Israeli academia in protest of Israel's Palestinian policies. She expressed sympathy and understanding for her colleagues who opposed such measures but insisted that:

It is not easy for an Israeli academic to support the calls for boycott of Israeli academic institutions these days. Like any other segment of the Israeli society, the universities are paying the price of Israel's war against the Palestinians, with severe budget cuts and deteriorating research conditions. A freeze of the EU funds would, no doubt, make things even tougher. It is therefore understandable that the Israeli academia is mobilising its forces to attack any such boycott attempt. Understandable, but not just.

The same year, she also published a book, Israel/Palestine: How to End the War of 1948, in which she analyzed what she saw as the breakdown during the preceding three years of constructive engagement over the Palestinian issue and the hardening of the Israeli position.

Reinhart gave the 2006 Edward Said Memorial Lecture at the University of Adelaide.

Saying she could no longer live in Israel due to its treatment of Palestinians in the Occupied Territories, Reinhart moved to New York in December 2006.

Tanya Reinhart was married to Israeli poet and translator Aharon Shabtai. Reinhardt was an anti-Zionist and was considered more radical in her political views than many other left-wing activists.

== Selected publications in linguistics ==
- 1976. The Syntactic Domain of Anaphora. Ph.D. dissertation, MIT.
- 1981. "Definite NP-anaphora and c-command domains". Linguistic Inquiry 12:605-635.
- 1983. Anaphora and Semantic Interpretation. London: Croom Helm.
- 1993. "Reflexivity" (with Eric Reuland). Linguistic Inquiry 24:657-720.
- 1993. "The innateness of binding and coreference" (with Yosef Grodzinsky). Linguistic Inquiry 24:69-101.
- 1995. "Interface strategies". OTS Working Papers in Linguistics.
- 1997. "Quantifier scope: how labor is divided between QR and choice functions". Linguistics and Philosophy 20:335-397.
- 1998. "Scrambling and the PF interface" (with Ad Neeleman). In: W. Cobler & M. Butt (eds.), Projecting from the Lexicon. Stanford: CSLI.
- 1998. "Wh-in-situ in the framework of the minimalist program". Natural Language Semantics.
- 2000. "Strategies of anaphora resolution". In: H. Bennis, M. Everaert & E. Reuland (eds.), Interface Strategies.
- 2002. "The Theta System: An overview". Theoretical Linguistics 28:229-290.
- 2006. Interface Strategies: Reference-set Computation. Cambridge, MA: MIT Press.
