= Beit Ijza =

Village in Jerusalem Governorate

- Local Development Committee

Arabic transcription(s)
  - Arabic: بيت إجزا
  - Latin: Bayt Ijza (official)
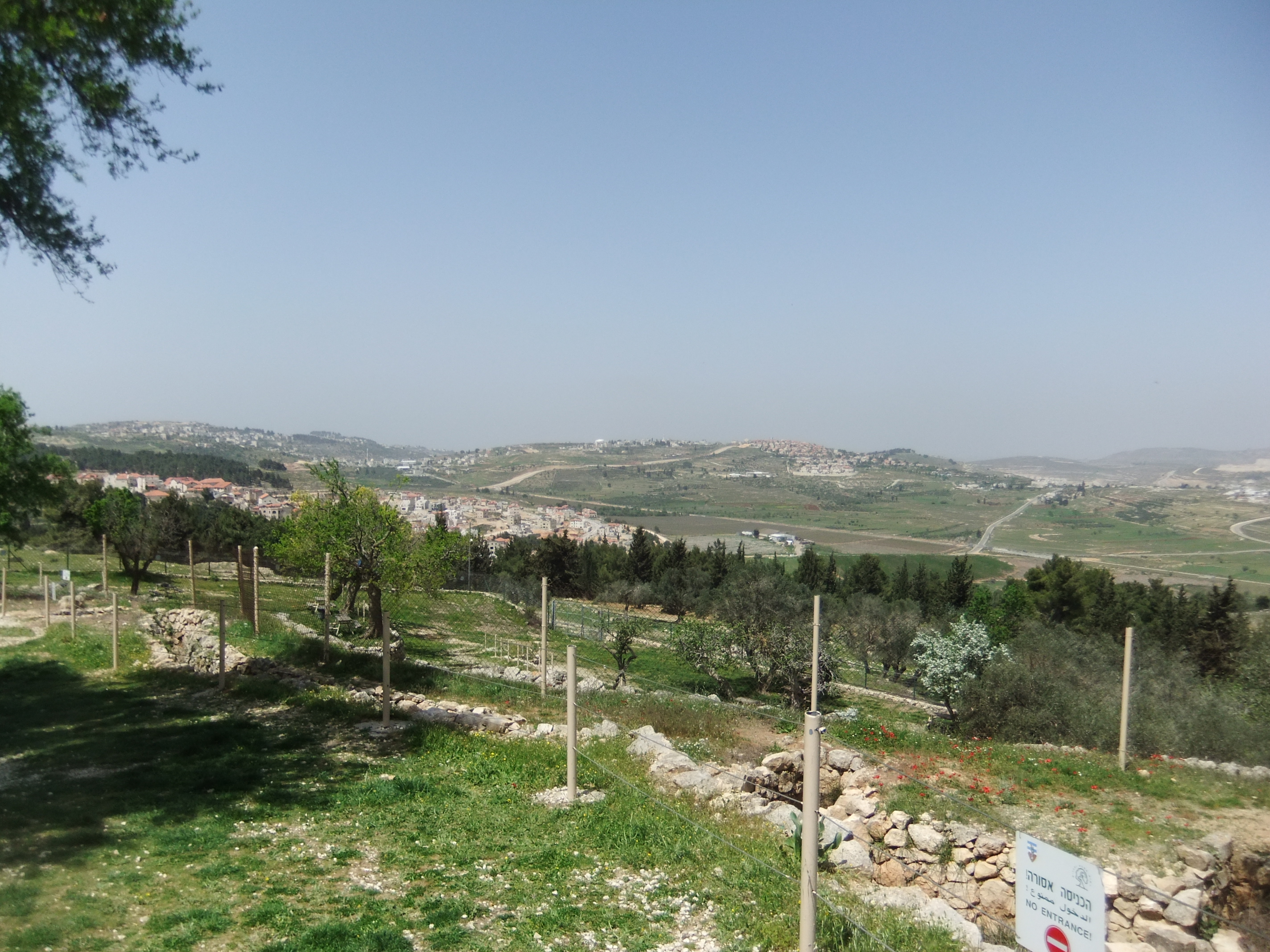
- View of Beit Ijza, 2012

- Location of Beit Ijza within Palestine
- Coordinates: 31°50′51″N 35°9′9″E
- Palestine grid: 164/139
- State: State of Palestine
- Governorate: Quds

Government
  - Type: Local Development Committee
- Elevation: 811 m (2,661 ft)

Population (2017)
  - Total: 854
- Postcode: P115
- Name meaning: Beit Izza, the house of Izza, from personal name

Beit Ijza (Arabic: بيت إجزا, also spelled Bayt Ijza); is a village in the Jerusalem Governorate in the central West Bank with an area of 2,526 dunams. Located approximately six miles north of Jerusalem, it had a population of 698 in 2007 and 854 by 2017.

== Location ==
Beit Ijza is located 11 kilometers (6.8 mi) north-west of Jerusalem, bordered by Al Jib to the east and Al Jib lands to the north, Beit Duqqu to the west, and Biddu to the south.

== History ==
=== Ottoman era ===
Beit Izja has its earliest mention in a record from 1538/9, where it was listed as a mazra'a (farm). In 1596 it appeared in the tax registers as being in the nahiya of Al-Quds in the liwa of Al-Quds under the name of Bayt Iza. It had a population of 6 household; who were all Muslims. They paid a fixed Ziamet tax-rate of 33.3% on agricultural products, including wheat, barley, summer crops, olive trees, vineyards, fruit trees, goats and beehives, in addition to occasional revenues; a total of 2,500 akçe.

In 1738 Richard Pococke named it Beteser, seeing it "on the hill to the east of the valley".

In 1838, it was described as a Muslim village, located in the Beni Malik area, west of Jerusalem.

In 1883 the PEF's Survey of Western Palestine (SWP) described Beit Izza as: "a village of moderate size on a hill with a spring at some distance to the west."

=== British Mandate era ===
In the 1922 census of Palestine conducted by the British Mandate authorities, "Bait Izza" had a population of 59 Muslims, decreasing slightly in the 1931 census to 54 Muslims, in 14 houses.

In the 1945 statistics Beit Ijza had a population of 70 Muslims, with a total of 2,550 dunams of land, according to an official land and population survey. Of this, Arabs used 122 dunams for plantations and irrigable land, 922 for cereals, while 8 dunams were built-up (urban) land.

=== Jordanian era ===
In the wake of the 1948 Arab–Israeli War, and after the 1949 Armistice Agreements, Beit Ijza came under Jordanian rule.

The Jordanian census of 1961 found 129 inhabitants in Beit Ijza.

=== Post 1967 ===
Since the Six-Day War in 1967, Beit Ijza has been under Israeli occupation.

Under the 1995 Oslo II Accord, 6.7% of the total village area was classified as Area B, and the remaining 93.3% classified as Area C, under full Israeli control. Israel has confiscated land in Beit Ijza for settlements, including Giv'at Ze'ev and Giv'on Ha'hadasha. In addition, the separation wall extends onto Beit Ijza land, leaving 980 dunums, (or 38.1% of the total village's area), behind the wall, on the Israeli side. The Palestinian owners of the land must rely on Israeli permission to access their land. Permission is only granted to the property owner, often elderly people, leaving them unable to hire help to work the land. One family in Beit Ijza lives with walls on all sides of its property due to extensive land expropriations by Israel.

== Shrine ==
Tawfiq Canaan found a Maqam (shrine) for en-nabi Yusif, on a spot which dominated Beit Ijza.

== Bibliography ==
- Barron, J.B., ed. (1923). Palestine: Report and General Abstracts of the Census of 1922. Government of Palestine.
- Canaan, T. (1927). Mohammedan Saints and Sanctuaries in Palestine. London: Luzac & Co.
- Conder, C.R.; Kitchener, H.H. (1883). The Survey of Western Palestine: Memoirs of the Topography, Orography, Hydrography, and Archaeology. Vol. 3. London: Committee of the Palestine Exploration Fund.
- Government of Jordan, Department of Statistics (1964). First Census of Population and Housing. Volume I: Final Tables; General Characteristics of the Population (PDF).
- Government of Palestine, Department of Statistics (1945). Village Statistics, April, 1945.
- Hadawi, S. (1970). Village Statistics of 1945: A Classification of Land and Area ownership in Palestine. Palestine Liberation Organization Research Center.
- Hütteroth, W.-D.; Abdulfattah, K. (1977). Historical Geography of Palestine, Transjordan and Southern Syria in the Late 16th Century. Erlanger Geographische Arbeiten, Sonderband 5. Erlangen, Germany: Vorstand der Fränkischen Geographischen Gesellschaft. ISBN 3-920405-41-2.
- Mills, E., ed. (1932). Census of Palestine 1931. Population of Villages, Towns and Administrative Areas. Jerusalem: Government of Palestine.
- Palmer, E.H. (1881). The Survey of Western Palestine: Arabic and English Name Lists Collected During the Survey by Lieutenants Conder and Kitchener, R. E. Transliterated and Explained by E.H. Palmer. Committee of the Palestine Exploration Fund.
- Pococke, R. (1745). A description of the East, and some other countries. Vol. 2. London: Printed for the author, by W. Bowyer.
- Pringle, D. (1997). Secular buildings in the Crusader Kingdom of Jerusalem: an archaeological Gazetteer. Cambridge University Press. ISBN 0521-46010-7. (pp. 17 - 18: this shows Beit Ijza, according to Pringle, 2009, p. 234)
- Pringle, D. (2009). The Churches of the Crusader Kingdom of Jerusalem: Volume IV The cities of Acre and Tyre with Addenda and Corrigenda to Volumes I-III. Vol. IV. Cambridge University Press. ISBN 978-0-521-85148-0. (p. 234)
- Robinson, E.; Smith, E. (1841). Biblical Researches in Palestine, Mount Sinai and Arabia Petraea: A Journal of Travels in the year 1838. Vol. 3. Boston: Crocker & Brewster.
