= Bir Nabala =

- Municipality type D (Village council)

Arabic transcription(s)
  - Arabic: بير نبالا
  - Latin: Beer Nabala (official)
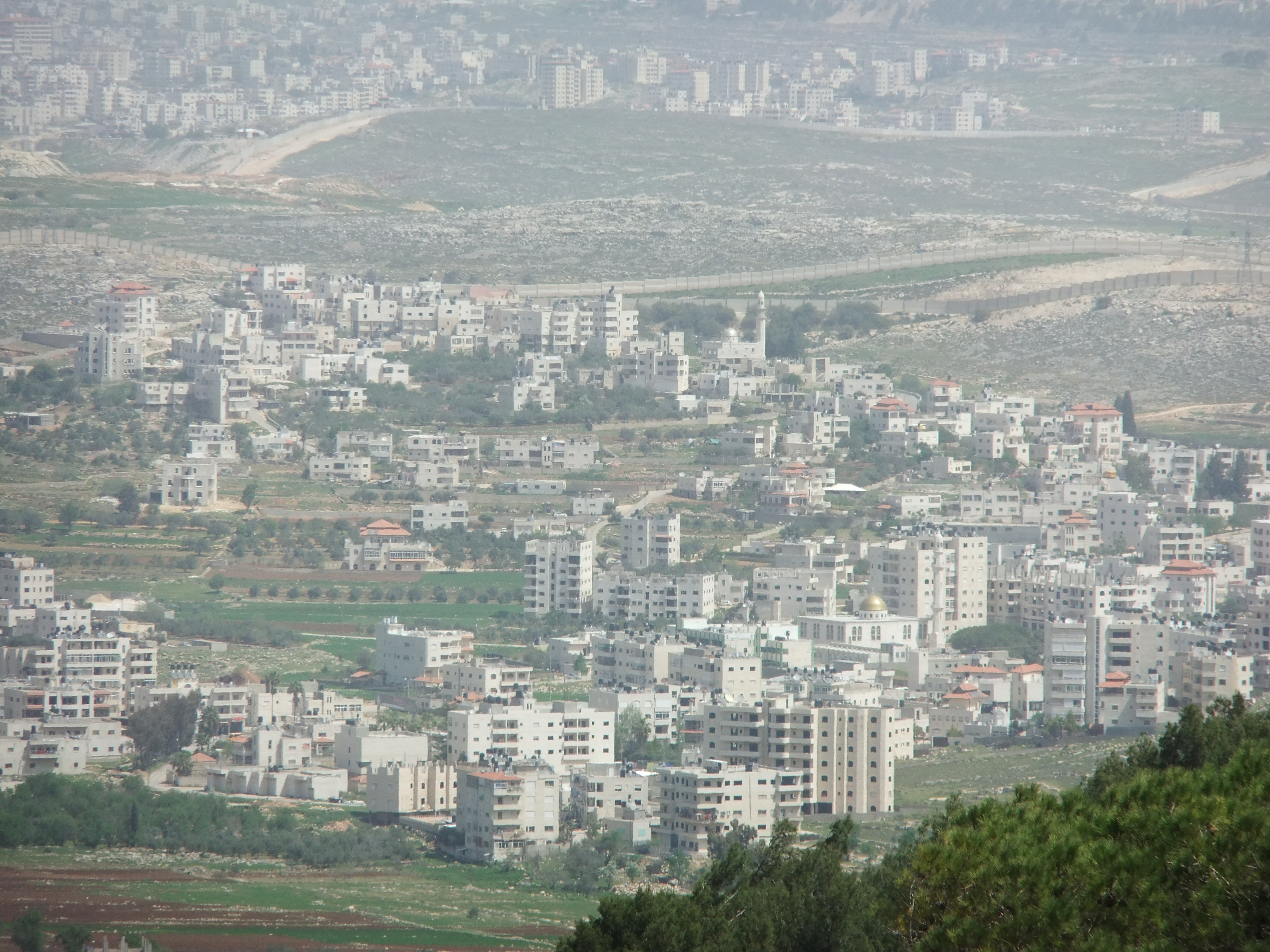
- Bir Nabala

- Location of Bir Nabala within Palestine Location of Bir Nabala within the West Bank
- Coordinates: 31°51′06″N 35°12′03″E
- Palestine grid: 168/139
- State: Palestine
- Governorate: Quds

Government
  - Type: Village council

Area
  - Total: 1.9 km^{2} (0.73 sq mi)

Population (2017)
  - Total: 6,004
  - Density: 3,200/km^{2} (8,200/sq mi)
- Name meaning: The well of apparatus

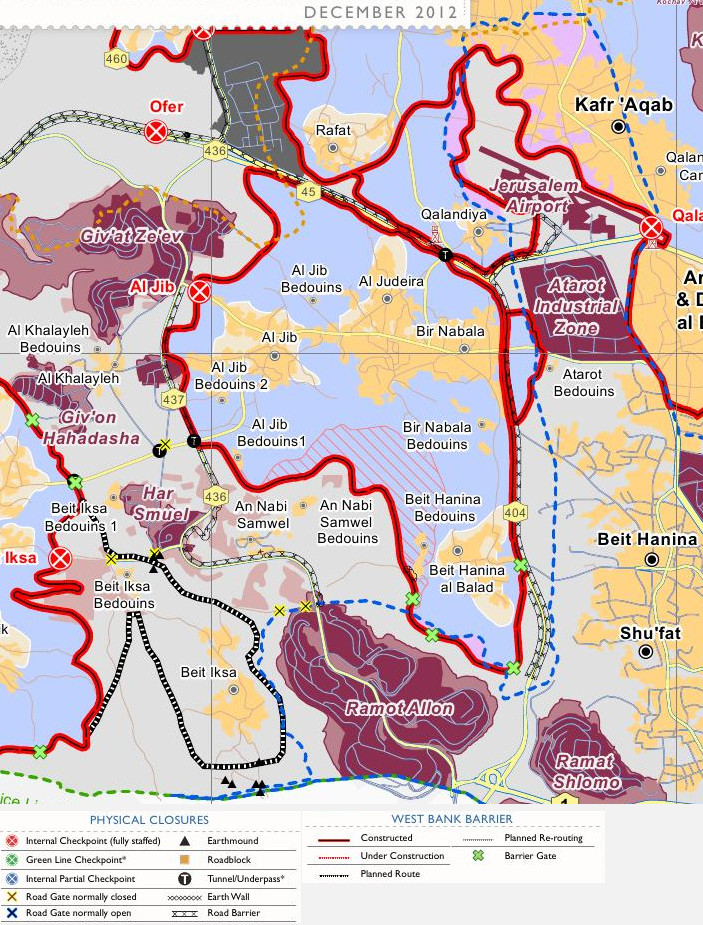
The barrier in northern Jerusalem, which confines Bir Nabala to an enclave under Israeli control.

Bir Nabala (Arabic: بير نبالا; Hebrew: ביר נבאלא) is a Palestinian enclave town in the West Bank located eight kilometers northeast of Jerusalem, in Palestine. In mid-year 2006, it had an estimated population of 6,100 residents. By 2017, the population was 6,004 Three Bedouin tribes — Abu Dhak, Tel al ‘Adassa and Jahalin — live in Bir Nabala. Bir Nabala has a built-up area of 1,904 dunams, which combined with nearby al-Jib, Beit Hanina al Balad and al-Judeira form an enclave in the Seam Zone, walled in by the Israeli West Bank barrier.

The enclave as a whole is home to approximately 15,000 Palestinians. It is linked to Ramallah by underpasses and a road that is fenced on both sides. From the Biddu enclave, residents travel along a fenced road that passes under a bypass road to Bir Nabala enclave, then on a second underpass under Bypass Road 443 to Ramallah.

Prior to the construction of the barrier, Bir Nabala was a commercial center linking Jenin and Tulkarm with the Jerusalem area and the town contained about 600 shops and six tyre factories. In 2007, there were 180 shops and two tyre factories.

== History ==
The remains of a vault, dating to the Crusader era have been found here.

During the Mamluk era, a waqf stipulated that the whole of the revenue from Bir Nabala should got to the ad-Dawādāriyya Madrasa in Jerusalem. The building was completed in 695 AH/1295−1296CE.

=== Ottoman era ===
In 1517, the village was included in the Ottoman Empire with the rest of Palestine and in the 1596 tax-records it appeared as Bir Nabala, located in the Nahiya of Jabal Quds of the Liwa of Al-Quds. The population was 4 households and 2 bachelors, all Muslim. They paid a fixed tax rate of 33.3% on agricultural products, which included wheat, barley, olive trees, vineyards, fruit trees, goats and beehives in addition to "occasional revenues"; a total of 1,300 akçe.

In 1738 Richard Pococke named it Beerna–billiah, seeing it "on a hill to the east".

In 1838 Edward Robinson noted Bir Nebala on his travels in the region, as a Muslim village in El Kuds region. In May, 1863 Guérin found it to have about 130 inhabitants. He further noted remains from the Crusader era and a few rock-cut tombs, one of them still in use by the locals. An official Ottoman village list sometime around 1870 listed Bir Nebala as having 24 houses and a population of 100, though the population count included only men.

In 1883, the PEF's Survey of Western Palestine (SWP) described it as "a village of moderate size, standing high, with a valley to the west. There are a few olives round the place."

In 1896 the population of Bir Nebala was estimated to be about 420 persons.

=== British Mandate era ===
In the 1922 census of Palestine conducted by the British Mandate authorities, Bir Nebala had a population of 367 Muslims, increasing in the 1931 census to 456 Muslims, in 106 inhabited houses.

In the 1945 statistics the population of Bir Nebala consisted of 590 Muslims and the land area was 2,692 dunams, according to an official land and population survey. Of this, 962 dunams were designated for plantations and irrigable land, 783 for cereals, while 21 dunams were built-up (urban) areas.

=== Jordanian era ===
In the wake of the 1948 Arab–Israeli War, and after the 1949 Armistice Agreements, Bir Nabala came under Jordanian rule. It was annexed by Jordan in 1950.

In 1961, the population of Bir Nabala was 850.

=== Post-1967 ===
Since the Six-Day War in 1967, Bir Nabala has been under Israeli occupation. The population in the 1967 census conducted by the Israeli authorities was 935, 19 of whom originated from Israeli territory.

After the 1995 accords, 14.4% of Bir Nabala’s land was classified as Area B, while the remaining 85.6% was classified as Area C. Israel has confiscated 675 dunums from Bir Nabala in order to construct Atarot Industrial zone, in addition to isolating 1,121 dunams of Bir Nabala land behind the West Bank barrier.

== Bibliography ==
- Barron, J.B., ed. (1923). Palestine: Report and General Abstracts of the Census of 1922. Government of Palestine.
- Berchem, van, M. (1922). MIFAO 43 Matériaux pour un Corpus Inscriptionum Arabicarum Part 2 Syrie du Sud T.1 Jérusalem "Ville" (in French and Arabic). Cairo: Impr. de l'Institut français d'archéologie orientale.
- Clermont-Ganneau, C.S. (1896). [ARP] Archaeological Researches in Palestine 1873-1874, translated from the French by J. McFarlane. Vol. 2. London: Palestine Exploration Fund. (p. 209)
- Conder, C.R.; Kitchener, H.H. (1883). The Survey of Western Palestine: Memoirs of the Topography, Orography, Hydrography, and Archaeology. Vol. 3. London: Committee of the Palestine Exploration Fund.
- Government of Jordan, Department of Statistics (1964). First Census of Population and Housing. Volume I: Final Tables; General Characteristics of the Population (PDF).
- Government of Palestine, Department of Statistics (1945). Village Statistics, April, 1945.
- Guérin, V. (1868). Description Géographique Historique et Archéologique de la Palestine (in French). Vol. 1: Judee, pt. 1. Paris: L'Imprimerie Nationale.
- Guérin, V. (1869). Description Géographique Historique et Archéologique de la Palestine (in French). Vol. 1: Judee, pt. 3. Paris: L'Imprimerie Nationale. (p. 5)
- Hadawi, S. (1970). Village Statistics of 1945: A Classification of Land and Area ownership in Palestine. Palestine Liberation Organization Research Center.
- Hartmann, M. (1883). "Die Ortschaftenliste des Liwa Jerusalem in dem türkischen Staatskalender für Syrien auf das Jahr 1288 der Flucht (1871)". Zeitschrift des Deutschen Palästina-Vereins. 6: 102–149.
- Hütteroth, W.-D.; Abdulfattah, K. (1977). Historical Geography of Palestine, Transjordan and Southern Syria in the Late 16th Century. Erlanger Geographische Arbeiten, Sonderband 5. Erlangen, Germany: Vorstand der Fränkischen Geographischen Gesellschaft. ISBN 3-920405-41-2.
- Hawari, M.; Yusuf Natsheh; Nazmi Al-Ju'beh (2013). Pilgrimage, Sciences and Sufism: Islamic Art in the West Bank and Gaza. Museum With No Frontiers, MWNF. ISBN 978-3902782113.
- Mills, E., ed. (1932). Census of Palestine 1931. Population of Villages, Towns and Administrative Areas. Jerusalem: Government of Palestine.
- Palmer, E.H. (1881). The Survey of Western Palestine: Arabic and English Name Lists Collected During the Survey by Lieutenants Conder and Kitchener, R. E. Transliterated and Explained by E.H. Palmer. Committee of the Palestine Exploration Fund.
- Pococke, R. (1745). A description of the East, and some other countries. Vol. 2. London: Printed for the author, by W. Bowyer.
- Pringle, D. (1997). Secular buildings in the Crusader Kingdom of Jerusalem: an archaeological Gazetter. Cambridge University Press. ISBN 0521-46010-7.
- Robinson, E.; Smith, E. (1841). Biblical Researches in Palestine, Mount Sinai and Arabia Petraea: A Journal of Travels in the year 1838. Vol. 2. Boston: Crocker & Brewster.
- Robinson, E.; Smith, E. (1841). Biblical Researches in Palestine, Mount Sinai and Arabia Petraea: A Journal of Travels in the year 1838. Vol. 3. Boston: Crocker & Brewster.
- Schick, C. (1896). "Zur Einwohnerzahl des Bezirks Jerusalem". Zeitschrift des Deutschen Palästina-Vereins. 19: 120–127.
- Socin, A. (1879). "Alphabetisches Verzeichniss von Ortschaften des Paschalik Jerusalem". Zeitschrift des Deutschen Palästina-Vereins. 2: 135–163.
- Tobler, T. (1854). Dr. Titus Toblers zwei Bucher Topographie von Jerusalem und seinen Umgebungen (in German). Vol. 2. Berlin: G. Reimer.
