= Denys Pringle =

British archaeologist and medievalist

Reginald Denys Pringle
- Born: 20 September 1951 (age 75)

Academic background
- Education: University of Southampton; Keble College, Oxford
- Thesis: Sixth-century fortifications in Byzantine Africa (1978)

Academic work
- Discipline: Archaeology, Medieval studies
- Sub-discipline: Crusader castles, Crusader states, medieval architecture
- Institutions: Queen's University Belfast; British School of Archaeology in Jerusalem; Historic Buildings and Monuments Directorate, Scotland; Cardiff University
- Notable works: Studies of Crusader castles and churches in the Kingdom of Jerusalem

Reginald Denys Pringle (born 20 September 1951) is a British archaeologist and medievalist. He is best known for his numerous publications regarding Crusader castles and Crusader-era churches in the Kingdom of Jerusalem, the 12th–13th century Crusader state in the Holy Land.

== Education and career ==
Pringle received a Diploma in Elementary Italian at the Università per Stranieri di Perugia in 1970, then studied Archaeology and History at the University of Southampton (BA) from 1970 to 1973. He later had his DPhil in Archaeology at the Keble College, Oxford, where he received his doctorate in 1978 with a dissertation on "Sixth-century fortifications in Byzantine Africa".

In 1977, he worked temporarily at the Queen's University of Belfast. From 1979 to 1984, he was the Assistant-Director of the British School of Archeology in Jerusalem. In 1984–1985, he was a Fellow in Byzantine Studies and Fulbright Scholar at the Harvard University. From 1986 to 1999, he worked as Principal Inspector of Ancient Monuments for the Historic Buildings and Monuments Directorate, Scotland. He then worked as a professor at Cardiff University from 2001 until 2013, when he retired. The castellologist Jean Mesqui described Pringle as "certainly among the foremost experts on medieval history, archaeology, and architecture on the Near East".

== Selected publications ==
- Pringle, Denys; et al. (1986). The Red Tower (al-Burj al-Ahmar): Settlement in the Plain of Sharon at the Time of the Crusaders and Mamluks A.D. 1099–1516. Monograph Series. Vol. 1. British School of Archaeology at Jerusalem. ISBN 9780950054261. (See Burgata.)
- Pringle, Denys (1997). Secular Buildings in the Crusader Kingdom of Jerusalem: An Archaeological Gazetteer. Cambridge University Press. ISBN 9780521460101.
- Pringle, Denys (2000). Fortification and Settlement in Crusader Palestine. Aldershot.
- Pringle, Denys; Harper, R. P. (2000). Belmont Castle: The Excavation of a Crusader Stronghold in the Kingdom of Jerusalem. Oxford: Oxford University Press for the Council for British Research in the Levant.
- Pringle, Denys (1993). The Churches of the Crusader Kingdom of Jerusalem. Vol. 1: A–K (excluding Acre and Jerusalem). Cambridge University Press. ISBN 9780521390361.
- Pringle, Denys (1998). The Churches of the Crusader Kingdom of Jerusalem. Vol. 2: L–Z (excluding Tyre). Cambridge University Press. ISBN 9780521390378.
- Pringle, Denys (2007). The Churches of the Crusader Kingdom of Jerusalem. Vol. 3: The City of Jerusalem. Cambridge University Press. ISBN 9780521390385.
- Pringle, Denys (2009). The Churches of the Crusader Kingdom of Jerusalem. Vol. 4: The Cities of Acre and Tyre with Addenda and Corrigenda to Volumes 1–3. Cambridge University Press. ISBN 9780521851480.

== Awards ==
- 2003 – Prix Gustave Schlumberger of the Académie des Inscriptions et Belles-Lettres.

== Family tree ==
Family tree of Denys Pringle

Sir James Pringle
Reginald James Pringle (died 1980)
Reginald Denys Pringle
Sir John Simeon, 1st Baronet (1756–1824)
Charles Simeon (1791–1858)
Rebecca Cornwall (died 1830)
Edward Simeon (1824–1898)
Thomas Woore
Frances Woore (died 1882)
Edward Archibald Simeon (1860–1930)
Jeffery Amherst Willows
Lavinia Willows (1834–1919)
Eliza
Charles Edward Barrington Simeon (1889–1955)
Charles Eddowes
Rose Beaumont Eddowes (died 1933)
Joan Denise Simeon (1919–1996)
Benjamin Arkle
Gladys Arkle (died 1983)
