= Place names of Palestine =

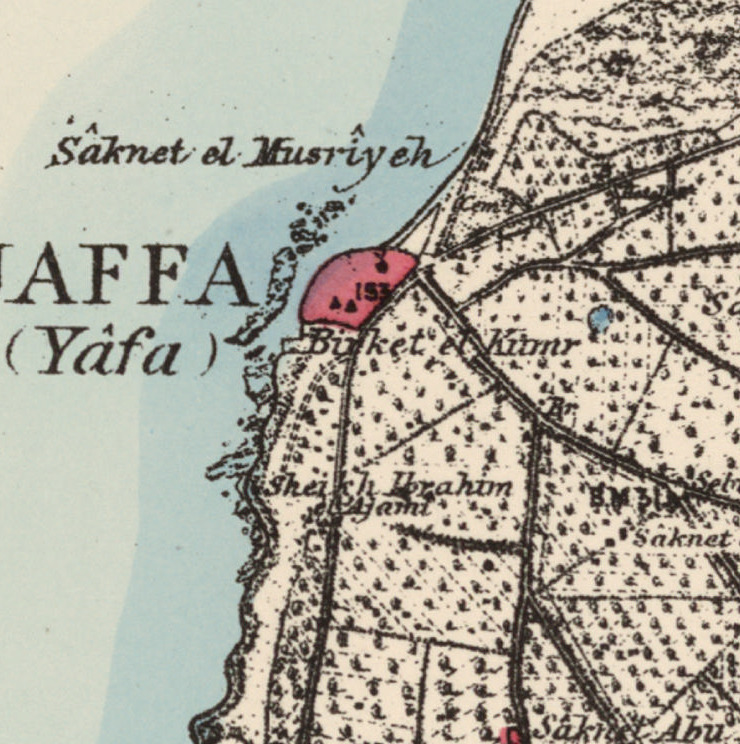
Map of Jaffa in the Palestine Exploration Fund's Survey of Palestine (1870s)

Many place names in Palestine are Arabized forms of ancient Canaanite and Biblical Hebrew or Aramaic place-names used over the course of the long history of Palestine. Most of these names have been handed down for thousands of years though their meaning was understood by only a few. The cultural interchange fostered by the various successive empires to have ruled the region is apparent in its place names. Any particular place can be known by the different names used in the past, with each of these corresponding to a historical period.

The importance of toponymy, or geographical naming, was first recognized by the Palestine Exploration Fund (PEF), a British organization who mounted geographical map-making expeditions in the region in the late 19th century. Shortly thereafter, the British Mandatory authorities set out to gather toponymic information from local fellahin, who had been proven to have preserved knowledge of the ancient place names which could help identify archaeological sites.

Since the establishment of the State of Israel, many place names have since been Hebraicized, and are referred to by their revived biblical names. In some cases, even sites with only Arabic names and no pre-existing ancient Hebrew names or associations have been given new Hebrew names. Place names in the region have been the subject of much scholarship and contention, particularly in the context of the Arab–Israeli conflict. Their significance lies in their potential to legitimize the historical claims asserted by the involved parties, all of whom claim priority in chronology, and who use archaeology, cartography, and place names as their proofs.

== History ==
The local population of Palestine used Semitic languages, such as Canaanite, ancient and Mishnaic Hebrew, Aramaic (Jewish Palestinian Aramaic, Christian Palestinian Aramaic, Samaritan Aramaic and Nabataean Aramaic), and Arabic (Old Arabic, Nabataean Arabic, Palestinian Arabic) for thousands of years. Almost all place names in the region have Semitic roots, with only a few place names being of Latin origin, and hardly any of Greek or Turkish origins. The Semitic roots of the oldest names continued to be used by the local population, though during classical antiquity, many names underwent modifications due to the influence of local ruling elites well versed in Greek and Latin.

In his 4th-century work, the Onomasticon, Eusebius of Caesarea provides a listing of the place-names of Palestine with geographical and historical commentary, and his text was later translated into Latin and edited and corrected by Jerome.

Following the Arab conquest of the Levant, many of the pre-classical Northwest Semitic names were revived; though the spelling and pronunciation sometimes differed, the original names were recognizable, "as nearly the same type of language was uninterruptedly spoken in the Southern Levant." Of course, for places where the old name had been lost or for new settlements established during this period, new Arabic names were coined.

According to Roy Marom and Ran Zadok, the general outlines of the Palestinian nomenclature of space were well developed, by the 16th century, "instead of being the more recent linguistic product of later centuries as previously thought." Palestinian place-names "traditionally regarded as the product of modern Palestinian rural society, reflect instead a long-lasting linguistic continuity of the country’s Arabic speaking village communities." A local study of place-names around Hamama has shown that Palestinian toponymy contained a limited stratum of pre-Ottoman place-names, to which residents added new toponyms, referring in cases to families living in or around the village.

Work on Palestinian toponymy has pointed to marked long-term survival of local place-names. Between the sixteenth and twentieth centuries, roughly half to three-fifths of major and minor landscape names, including field names, trees, and rocky features, remained in use. On that basis, scholars have also drawn on Early Ottoman documentation to recover and match names mentioned in classical sources for sites still occupied in the Late Roman period.

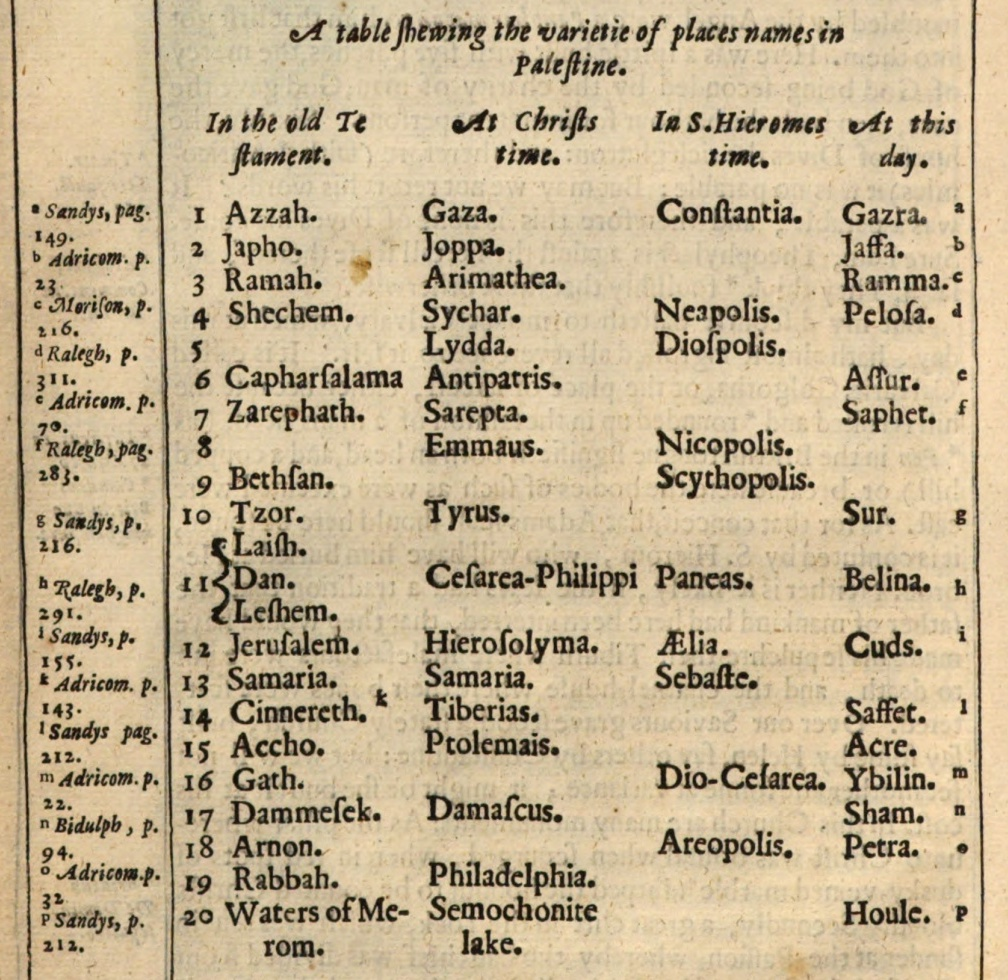
In 1639, Thomas Fuller's The Historie of the Holy Warre included "A table shewing the varietie of place names in Palestine", comparing the historical names of key Biblical locations. Several of the names for "today" are incorrect and show a lack of familiarity with Arabic names and orthography

European travelers composed travel accounts describing its topography and demography. However, even in last century of Ottoman imperial rule, there was still much confusion over the place names in Palestine. Existing Turkish transliterations of the Arabic and Arabicized names made identification and study into the etymology of the place names even more challenging.

Edward Robinson identified more than 100 biblical place names in Palestine, by pursuing his belief that linguistic analysis of the place names used by the Arab fellahin would reveal preserved traces of their ancient roots. The PEF's Names and Places in the Old and New Testaments and the Apocrypha, with their Modern Identifications (1895) lists more than 1,150 place names related to the Old Testament and 162 related to the New, most of which are located in Palestine. These surveys by Robinson the PEF, and other Western biblical geographers in late 19th and early 20th centuries, also eventually contributed to the shape of the borders delineated for the British Mandate in Palestine, as proposed by the League of Nations.

Over the last 125 years, beginning with Zionist immigration and intensifying following the establishment of Israel in parts of Palestine, 7000 place names have since been Hebraized or are referred to by their revived Biblical names. In some cases, even sites with only Arabic names and no pre-existing ancient Hebrew names or associations have been given new Hebrew names.

=== Preservation ===
A systematic study of place-names showed very high levels of pre-modern name preservation rates along the Eastern Mediterranean highland chain, primarily of site names, and oronyms. The preservation of place names "with amazing consistency" is noted by Yohanan Aharoni in The Land of the Bible (1979). He attributes this continuity to the common Semitic background of Palestine's local inhabitants throughout the ages, and the fact that place names tended to reflect extant agricultural features at the site in question. According to Aharoni, 190 out of the 475 placenames in the southern Levant may be identified based on name preservation. Ahituv wrote that out of the 358 placenames referenced in the Book of Joshua, he was able to identify 149 (41%) of them using this method. On the same time, out of the 450 names mentioned, names from Second Temple, Mishnaic, and Talmudic sources, roughly 75% have been preserved.

According to Uzi Leibner, this preservation of names is "a function of continuity of settlement at the site itself, or at least in the immediate region", and most of the sites in question were inhabited during the Byzantine and Middle Islamic periods.

A study of place-name preservation between Jerusalem and Jaffa (1550–2000 CE), found that the lowest levels of preservation of recorded toponyms were in the lowlands (20–25%), while the highlands were characterized by much higher preservation rate of 40–60%.

=== Conversations with fellahin as main method of identification ===
The vast majority of place-name identifications are made upon their similarity to existing Palestinian Arabic place names, or else upon the assessment of other geographical information provided by the Biblical texts.

Many of the local names were learned by the explorers by asking the local fellahin. Clermont-Ganneau noted that the fellahin women were more ancient in their habits, attire, and language and frequently had greater knowledge of names than the fellahin men, which occasionally prompted the men to respond violently.

Occasionally, the same geographic feature could go by several names among the locals. The valley next to Khirbet 'Adaseh, north of Jerusalem, was referred to as Wady ed-Dumm, "Valley of Blood" by the people of Beit Hanina (which some have claimed got its name from being the location of the battle of Adasa), and Wady 'Adaseh by the people of Bir Nabala.

=== Archaeological method identifications ===
James B. Pritchard wrote in 1959 that of the thousands of ancient places throughout Palestine known by name from the Hebrew Bible and historical sources, only four had then been identified based on inscriptions found during archaeological excavations at the respective locations: Gezer (boundary stones near Tell el-Jazari), Beit She'an (an Egyptian stela of Seti I found at Beisan), Lachish (the Lachish lettersfound at Tell ed-Duweir) and Gibeon (the Al Jib jar handles). Hershel Shanks wrote in 1983 that Gezer was the first of these, and that Tel Arad and Tel Hazor have also been identified in this manner. In 1996, the location of Ekron was supported with the discovery of the Ekron Royal Dedicatory Inscription.

== Linguistic roots ==
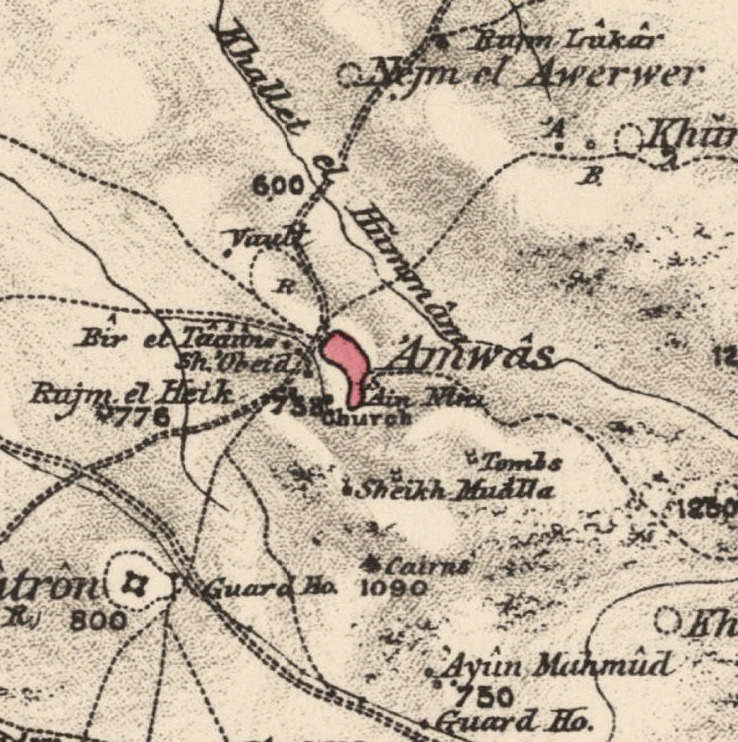
1870s map of the Imwas area by the Palestine Exploration Fund's Survey of Palestine

=== Water sources ===
Agricultural features are common to roots of place names in Palestine. For example, some place names incorporate the Semitic root for "spring" or "cistern", such as Beersheba or Bir as 'Saba, ("be'er" and "bir" meaning "well" in Hebrew and Arabic respectively) and En Gedi or 'Ayn Jeddi ("en" and "'ayn" meaning "spring" in Hebrew and Arabic respectively).

=== Features ===
Haim Ben-David notes that the word "caphar" appears just once in the Hebrew Bible (for Cephar-ammoni) but much more frequently in later sources, which implies it is of Aramaic origin and was introduced to the area only during the Second Temple period.

=== Deities ===
Other place names preserve the names of Semitic gods and goddesses from ancient times. For example, the name of the goddess Anat survives in the name of the village of 'Anata, believed to be site of the ancient city of Anathoth. The name Beit Shemesh means ‘House [of] Šamaš’, indicating that it was a site of worship of the Canaanite sun-deity Šapaš/Šamaš.

=== Direct translations ===
In a few cases, the original name was translated, such as the ancient city of Dan (Hebrew: דן, "judge") which became Arabic: تل القاضي Tell el-Qadi ("mound of the judge"). The original untranslated name of the city was preserved in the nearby source of the Jordan River, with the name "Dhan" (Arabic: ضان).

Other examples are the names of Capitolias, which was referred to in the 6th century Talmud in Aramaic as Bet Reisha, and was later translated to Arabic as Beit Ras, and the Ladder of Tyre, also known in Rabbinic literature as Lavanan or Lavlavan (from the Hebrew: לבן, "white"), was later translated into Arabic as Ras el-Bayda (White head), and into Latin by the Crusaders, as Album Promontorium.

=== Exceptions ===
Yehuda Elitzor observes that in the majority of cases, Arabic-speakers did not give new names to places where their original names were known and existing; an exception is the city of Hebron, for which its historic name was replaced by the Arabic name "Khalil al-Rahman"; he suggests that the new name was lifted from a tradition prevalent among the Jews of Hebron.

== Linguistic conversion ==
The Hebrew letter Ḥet (ח) is correctly Ḥāʾ (ح) in Arabic, though frequently also Ḫāʾ(خ), and sometimes 'Ayn (ع) takes its place (as happened in Beth Horon > Beit 'Ur). Guerin noted that in his time, Beit Hanina was sometimes referred to as Bayt 'Anina.

Another similar case is the shift from 'Ayin ([ʕ], Hebrew: ע, Arabic: ع) into Aleph ([ʔ], Hebrew: א, Arabic: ا), even though both sounds exist in Arabic. For instance, the Biblical name Endor (עין דור, using [ʕ]) was changed to Indur (إندور, using [ʔ]). The Jews of Galilee (specifically in Haifa, Beth-shean and Tiv'on) were already "producing Ayins as Alephs," according to rabbinic literature, which already makes notice of this shift.

== Evolution of names, a selection ==
- 'Aīd el Mâ: Commonly identified as the biblical site of Adullam, mentioned in 1 Samuel 22:2.
- Ascalon: ʿAsqalān preserves the original long ā form of Asqalānu, first recorded in the Execration texts from the 18th-19th centuries BCE, and the ʾAsqalāna used the Kadesh inscriptions (c. 1274 BCE) The long ō vowel form seen in seven of the Amarna letters (c. 1350 BCE) from King Yidya of Ašqaluna to Akhenaten, the pharaoh of the New Kingdom of Egypt and in the Merneptah Stele (c. 1208 BCE) as Asqaluni, are a result of the Canaanite shift. This long ō vowel form ʾAšqəlōn also used settlement is also eleven times in the Hebrew Bible. The affix *-ānu is known from Ugaritic and Amorite personal names. It is speculated that the name comes from the Northwest Semitic and possibly Canaanitic triliteral root ṯ-q-l 'to weigh', which is also the triliteral root of the word shekel. The ʔa + root construction, commonly used in Arabic and some other Central Semitic languages and seen in nearby place names like Ashdod and Achziv, could be either an elative (ie. "weightist") or plural (ie. "weights).
- El-Azariyeh: The town of Bethany, so-called because of its most notable citizen, Lazarus.
- Battir: During the Bar Kokhba revolt, this site was known as Betar. Its Arabic name Battir is evidently related to the ancient name. The village was also identified by an ancient mound in the vicinity called Khirbet el-Yahud ("ruin of the Jews").
- Beit Ur al-Fauqa (Arabic: بيت عور الفوقة, "Upper house of straw") and Beit Ur al-Tahta (Arabic: بيت عور التحتى, "Lower house of straw") preserve parts of the original Canaanite names for these sites: Bethoron Elyon ("Upper Bethoron"), and Bethoron Tahton ("Lower Bethoron"). Bethoron means the "House of Horon", named for the Egypto-Canaanite deity Horon mentioned in Ugaritic literature and other texts.
- Bayt Jibrin, an Arab village depopulated during the 1948 Arab–Israeli war. This village was originally known by the Aramaic name Beth Gabra ("house of the strong men"). The Romans gave it the Greek name of Eleutheropolis ("city of the free") but it is nonetheless listed in the Tabula Peutingeriana of 393 AD as Beitogabri." In the Talmud, its name is transcribed as Beit Gubrin (or Guvrin). The Crusaders referred to it as Bethgibelin or simply Gibelin. Its Arabic name Beit Jibrin ("house of the powerful") is derived from the original Aramaic name. The kibbutz of Beit Guvrin, Israel was built in 1949 and named for the ancient site.
- Beit Shemesh: Identified by Edward Robinson by cross-referencing the Arabic name for the tiny village and spring located there by the name of Ain Shems (ˁēn šams, ‘Spring [of] Šamaš’), against biblical and historical texts. The name "House [of] Šamaš’", which indicates it was a site of worship of the Canaanite sun-deity Šapaš/Šamaš. The Israelites controlled the town for a while during the Iron Age, turning it into a Levitical city (Josh 21:16), but never changing its pagan name. It was destroyed during the Assyrian/Babylonian conquest approx. 2500 years ago. Modern Beit Shemesh is a majority Haredi Jewish city, established in the 1950s near the ruins of the ancient city of the same name.
- Dayr Aban: Literally, "Monastery of Aban," thought by historical geographers to be the biblical Abenezer, mentioned in 1 Samuel 4:1, and located 3 kilometers east of `Ain Shems (Beit Shemesh).
- Deir Hajla: The site of the ancient Beth-ḥagla mentioned in Joshua 15:6.
- Hebron: Hebron is known in Arabic as "al-Khalil", so-called after Abraham the Patriarch who was called the "friend" (Ar. "khalil") of God.
- Indur: Depopulated during the 1948 Arab–Israeli war, this village preserves the name of the ancient Canaanite city of Endor. Though the precise location of the ancient site remains a source of debate, the preferred candidate lies 1 kilometer northeast of Indur, a site known as Khirbet Safsafa.
- Jenin: Jenin is identified with the biblical towns of Ein Ganim and Beth-Haggan. In Hellenistic and Roman times, it was known as Ginat or Ginae. The Arabicized name Jenin derived from the original.
- Jericho: Known among the local inhabitants as Ariha (Ar-riha, meaning "fragrance"), it is described in the 10th century Book of Josippon, as "Jericho: City of Fragrance" (ir hareah). It is thought that the current name is derived from the Canaanite name Yareah, meaning "moon".
- Jebel Quruntul: Originally a Semitic name (possibly Dagon) preserved in the Hellenistic fortress name Dok, renamed Quarantana & related names in Latin to reflect the belief that St Helena had identified a cave there as the place Jesus fasted for 40 days, preserved as Arabic Quruntul and Hebrew Qarantal.
- Jib: Al-Jib preserves the name of its ancient predecessor, Gibeon.
- Kafr 'Ana: The Arabicized form of the name Ono, a Canaanite town mentioned in 1 Chronicles 8:12.
- Lifta: Commonly identified as the biblical site of Nephtoah, mentioned in the Book of Joshua (15:9; 18:15).
- Nablus: Originally named Mabartha or Mamorpha, the town was renamed to Flavia Neapolis after 72 AD by the Romans who had destroyed the nearby ancient city of Shechem (which is located in the current city of Nablus). After the Early Muslim Conquests in 636 AD, it was Arabicized to Nablus.
- Qal'at Ras el-'Ain: Literally, "the Castle of the Fountain-head," or what was formerly called Antipatris (a site near Rosh HaAyin), at the source of the Yarkon River, also known as Nahr Abū Fuṭrus (a corruption of Antipatris).
- Qamun: A tell near Mount Carmel. Qamun's original name was the Israelite Yokneam, from which the Arabic Qamun (meaning "cumin") was derived. Before Israelite times the Canaanite city was probably called En-qn'mu' as it appears in Egyptian sources. The Romans called it Cammona and Cimona, while the Crusaders called it Caymont and also Cains Mon ("Cain's Mountain") reflecting a popular local tradition that Cain was slain nearby
- Ramallah: Commonly identified as the biblical site of Mizpah in Benjamin.
- Seilun, Kh.: A Middle and Late Bronze Age Canaanite city and a central Israelite cultic site, recorded as Shiloh in the four books of the Bible (Joshua, Judges, 1 Samuel, and Psalms). The tell comprising the ruins of the ancient town is known is Modern Hebrew as Tel Shiloh.
- Tuqu: The Arabicized form of the name Teqoa, mentioned several times in the Bible.
- Tulkarm: Founded in the 3rd century AD as Berat Soreqa, its name in Aramaic was Tur Karma, meaning "mount of the vineyards". This name was then Arabicized to Tul Karem.
- Yahudiya (known as Al-'Abbasiyya since 1932) means "the Jewish (city)" and is thought to be related to the biblical town of Yahud, mentioned in the Book of Joshua.
- Yalo: Destroyed during the 1967 war, this village was originally known by the Canaanite name Aijalon. The Arabic name Yalu, by which it was known for centuries, is derived from the Canaanite original.
- Yazur: Depopulated prior to the 1948 war, the village's name in the 8th and 7th centuries BC is recorded in Assyrian texts as Azuru.
- Yodfat: A Jewish town in the Galilee destroyed in the First Jewish–Roman War, when it was known as Jotapata (Yodfat). Before the establishment of Israel, its site was known as Shifat, Kh.

=== Places named for plants ===
In an article on Plant Lore and Superstition, Tawfiq Canaan notes that many locations in Palestine are named for plants, with some of these names appearing in the Bible, or illuminating a detail about the history of the site. For example:

- deir el-balah, "the date monastery"
- et-tineh, "the fig"
- qariet el-inab, "the village of grapes", the former name of Abu Ghosh
- kafr qar, "pumpkin village"
- Beth Kerem, "house of vines", preserved in the name of Ein Kerem, "spring of vines"
- Rimmon, "pomegranate"
- djabal ez-zêtûn, "the mount of olives"
- djôrat el'ennāb, "the vale of the jujube"

== Use of place names as personal names ==
Among Palestinians, and Arabs more generally, it is common for place names to be used as a nisba or adjectival noun to denote a connection, often of origin, of a person or family. The adoption of such nisab as surnames is a practice that began in the 18th and 19th centuries, though Pierre Dauzet noted adopting the name of their village of origin - or in rarer cases, conferring their name upon it - as a part of family naming customs in Palestine stretching back to the 16th century. In a 2005 study of 8,343 family names taken from the Palestinian phone directory in Palestine, 551 (6.6 %) were related to geographical area, while an earlier 1992 study placed the figure at 8.7%.

Examples of such nisab and/or surnames include:

- Qudsi, (or Maqdisi) "of Jerusalem"(Al Quds, eg. Al-Maqdisi, Diya' al-Din al-Maqdisi)
- Asqalani, "of Asqalan" (eg. Ibn Hajar al-Asqalani, Gharib Asqalani)
- Akkawi, "of Akka" (one of the many nisab for Muhammad ibn Nasr ibn al-Qaysarani)
- Qaysarani, "of Qisarya"
- Nabulsi, "of Nablus"
- Naasari, "of Nazareth"
- Liddawi, "of Lydda"
- Gazzawi, "of Gaza", (eg. Izzat Ghazzawi)
- Haifawi, "of Haifa"
- Khaleeli, "a person from Hebron" (known in Arabic as al-Khalil) (eg. Abdul Khalili)
- Ramlawi, "of Ramla"
- Qalqili, "of Qalqilya"
- Salfiti, "of Salfit"
- Ammouri, "a person from Ammuriya"
- Anabtawi, "of Anabta" (eg. Aseel Anabtawi)
- Anbousi, "a person from Ainabous"
- Ajjouri, "of 'Ajjur", etc. (eg. Akram al-Ajouri)
- Artoufi, "a person from Artuf"
- Atteeli, "a person from Attil"
- Awartaani, "a person from Awarta
- Burqaawi, "a person from Burqa, Ramallah"
- Jayyousi, "a person from Jayyous" (eg. Jayyusi family)
- Hijjaawi, "a person from Hajjah"
- Housaani, "a person from Husan"
- Naquri, "of Naqura"
- Majdalawi, "of Majdal" (eg. Jamil Majdalawi)
- Qabalaawi, "a person from Qabalan'
- Rantisi, "a person from Rantis"
- Sailaawi, a person from Silat al-Harithiya"
- Saffouri, "a person from Saffuriyya"
- Ghawrani, "of Ghawr/Ghor"
- Talhami, "of Bethlehem"
- Sahouri, "of Beit Sahour"
- Bajjali, "of Beit Jala"
- Ta'mari, "of Beit Ta'mir" (used exclusively by the Ta'amireh tribesmen).

Some Palestinian surnames reference places outside of Palestine, from whence the families originally came before becoming Palestinians, (eg. Shami from "Damascus", Karaki from Karak, Salti from As-Salt, Ajlouni "from Ajloun, Makki from Mecca, Masri "Egyptian", Qubti "Coptic", Yamani "Yemenite", Turki "Turkish", Qubursi "from Cyprus", Malti "Maltese", Irani "Iranian", 'Iraqi "Iraqi", Hindawi "Indian", Afghani "Afghani", etc)

Since the Nakba and exile of 1948, Palestinians have begun a tradition of naming their daughters after the depopulated villages.

== See also ==
- Names of Jerusalem
- Hebraization of Palestinian place names
- List of modern names for biblical place names
- Language shift
- Timeline of the name Palestine
- Glossary of Arabic toponyms

== Sources ==
- Macalister, R.A. Stewart (1911), "Eleutheropolis" , in Chisholm, Hugh (ed.), Encyclopædia Britannica, vol. 9 (11th ed.), Cambridge University Press, p. 263
