= Pool of Gibeon =

Site in Gibeon mentioned in the Hebrew Bible

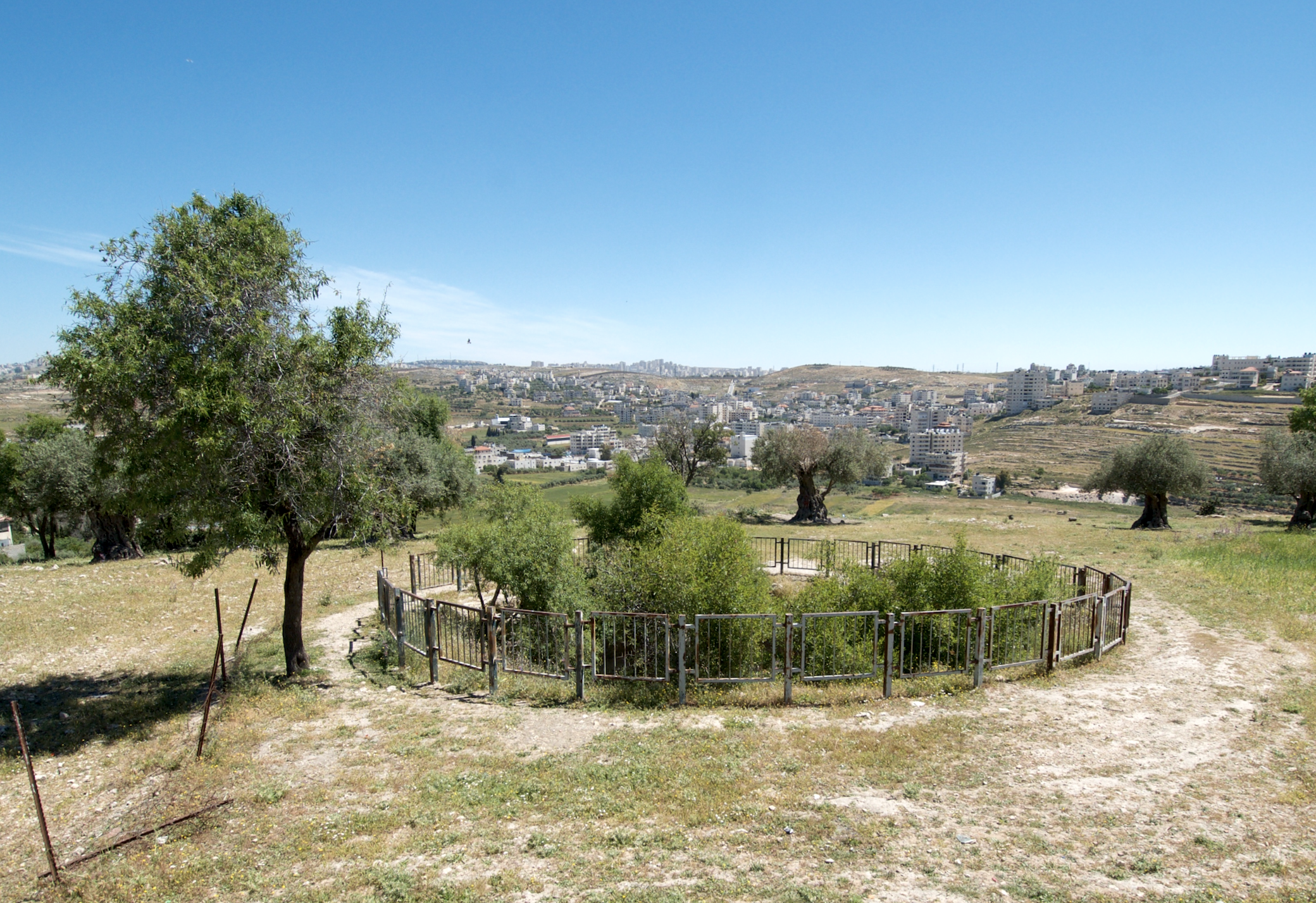
- The Pool of Gibeon

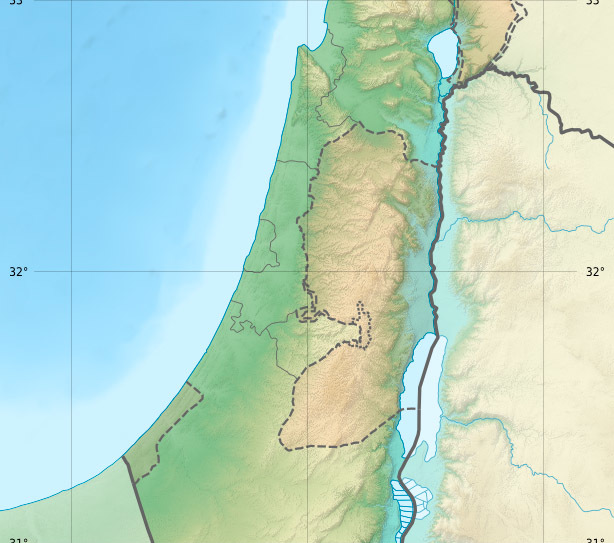
- Location within West Bank
- 31.847545°N 35.186481°E
- Type: Rock-cut
- Cultures: Israelite, Canaanite
- Location: Gibeon (ancient city)
- Region: West Bank

Site notes
- Material: Bedrock
- Height: 35 feet (11 meters)
- Diameter: 37 feet (11 meters)
- Archaeologists: James B. Pritchard
- Condition: In ruins

The Pool of Gibeon is a site in Gibeon mentioned a number of times in the Hebrew Bible. Archeological evidence locates the historical site of the pool in the village of Jib, in the West Bank Palestinian territories.

== Biblical accounts ==
=== Abner and Joab ===
In the Second Book of Samuel, twelve men commanded by Abner fought twelve men commanded by Joab at the pool.

Abner the son of Ner, and the servants of Ish-bo'sheth the son of Saul, went out from Mahana'im to Gibeon. And Jo'ab the son of Zeru'iah, and the servants of David, went out and met them at the pool of Gibeon; and they sat down, the one on the one side of the pool, and the other on the other side of the pool. And Abner said to Jo'ab, "Let the young men arise and play before us." And Jo'ab said, "Let them arise." Then they arose and passed over by number, twelve for Benjamin and Ish-bo'sheth the son of Saul, and twelve of the servants of David. And each caught his opponent by the head, and thrust his sword in his opponent's side; so they fell down together. Therefore that place was called Hel'kath-hazzu'rim, which is at Gibeon. And the battle was very fierce that day; and Abner and the men of Israel were beaten before the servants of David.2 Samuel 2:12–17

== Archaeological findings ==
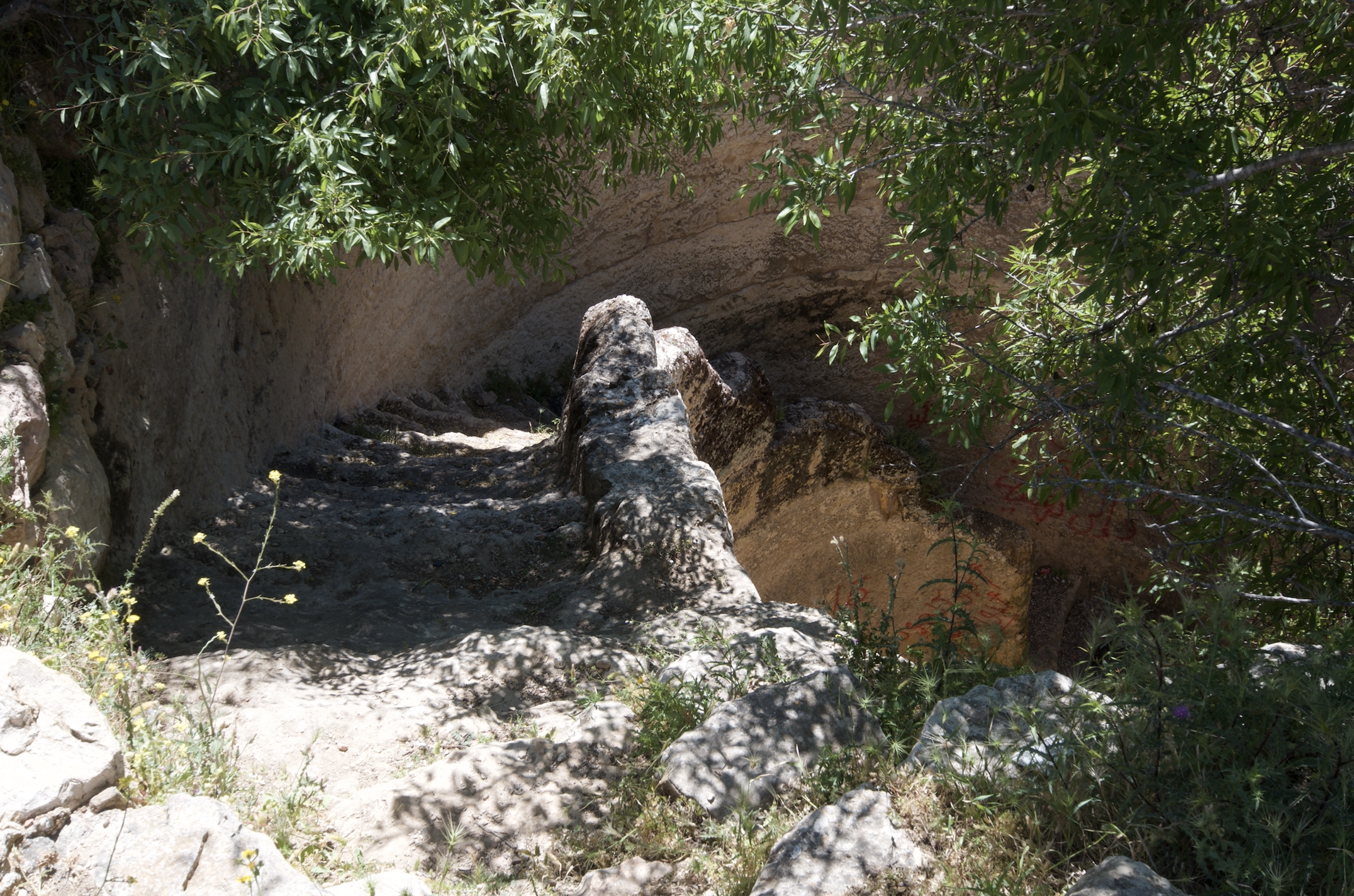
Steps leading into the Pool of Gibeon

The remains of Gibeon were excavated in the late 1950s and early 1960s by a team of archeologists led by University of Pennsylvania archaeologist James B. Pritchard.

The pool itself was unearthed in 1957. The Pool of Gibeon, "one of the ancient world's remarkable engineering achievements", was dug 88 ft (27 m) into limestone until it met the water table. A spiral staircase along the walls allowed access to the water, according to the archeologists that excavated the site.
