= Al-Judeira =

- Palestinian village

Arabic transcription(s)
  - Arabic: الجديرة
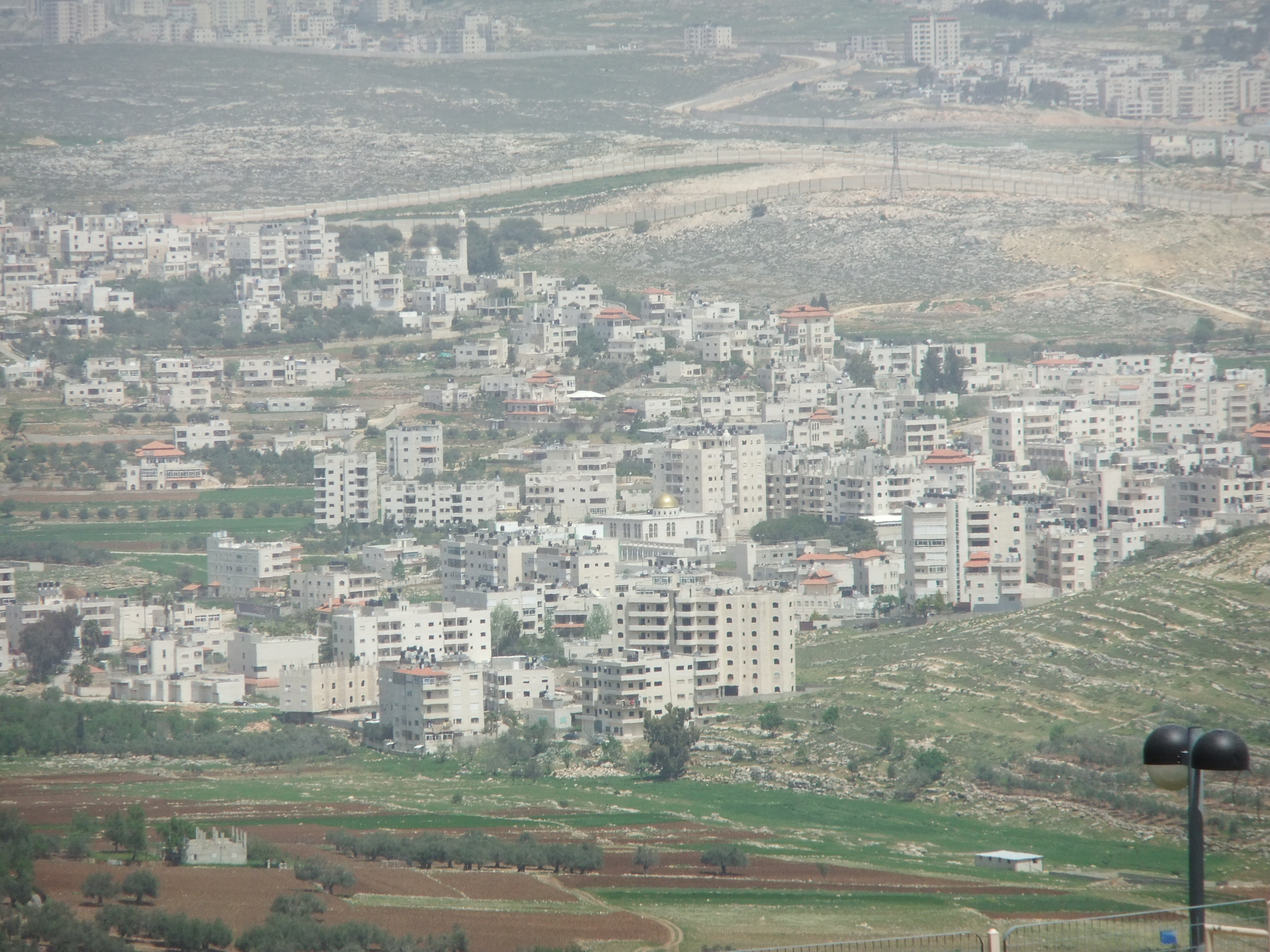
- al-Judeira in the front of the picture.

- Location of Al-Judeira within Palestine
- Coordinates: 31°51′30″N 35°11′52″E
- Palestine grid: 168/140
- State: State of Palestine
- Governorate: Quds

Government
  - Type: Village council

Population (2017)
  - Total: 2,634
- Name meaning: The sheep-fold

Al-Judeira (Arabic: الجديرة) is a Palestinian village in the Jerusalem Governorate of the State of Palestine, in the central West Bank.

According to the Palestinian Central Bureau of Statistics, the town had a population of 2,634 in 2017.

== Toponymy ==
E. H. Palmer of the Palestine Exploration Fund wrote that Al-Judeira means "sheep-fold", after the Hebrew: גדרה, romanized: Gederah, "fold".

== Location ==
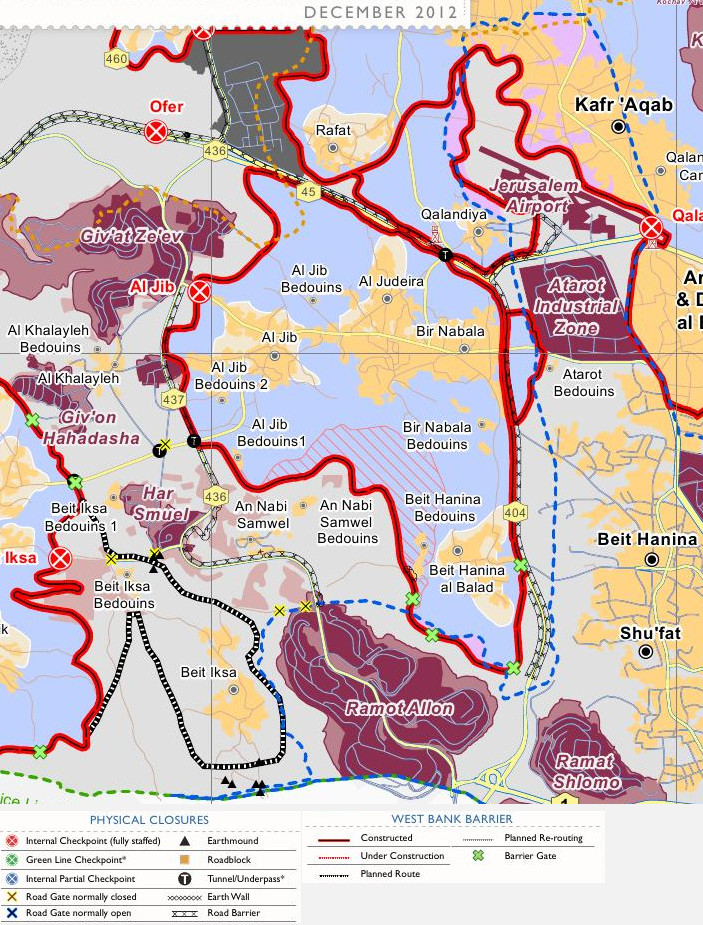
The barrier in northern Jerusalem, which confines al-Juderia to an enclave under Israeli control.

Al Judeira is located (horizontally) 9.3 kilometers (5.8 mi) north-west of Jerusalem. To the east is Kalandia, Rafat is to the north, Al Jib is to the west, and Bir Nabala is to the south.

== History ==
=== Ancient period ===
Several scholars have suggested that Judeira is the site of Gederah in Benjamin, which is mentioned in the Bible as home to Yozabad the Gederathite, a Benjaminite warrior who defected to David. It is mentioned shortly after the nearby sites of Azmaveth (identified with modern-day Hizme), Anathoth (probably 'Anata) and Gibeon (Al Jib).

=== Ottoman era ===
In the Ottoman census of the 1500s, Jadira was noted as a village located in the nahiya of Jerusalem.

In 1838 el-Jedireh was noted as a Muslim village, located north of Jerusalem.

In 1863 Guérin described it as a small village, with a mosque consecrated to a Sheikh Yassin. In the courtyard in front of this sanctuary, he noticed what was possibly an old Corinthian capital, which had been made into a mortar, where the villagers pounded coffee. An Ottoman village list from about 1870 found that the village had a population of 40, in a total of 13 houses, though the population count only included men. It was also noted that it was located east of Al Jib.

In 1883, the PEF's Survey of Western Palestine (SWP) described it as "a small village on a slope, surrounded by figs and olives, and with rock-cut tombs to the north."

=== British Mandate era ===
In the 1922 census of Palestine conducted by the British Mandate authorities, Ijdireh had a population of 122, all Muslims, increasing in the 1931 census to 139 Muslim inhabitants, in 31 inhabited houses.

In the 1945 statistics Judeira had a population of 190 Muslims, with 2,044 dunams of land, according to an official land and population survey. Of this, 353 dunams were plantations and irrigable land, 1,314 used for cereals, while 7 dunams were built-up (urban) land.

=== Jordanian era ===
In the wake of the 1948 Arab–Israeli War, and after the 1949 Armistice Agreements, al-Judeira came under Jordanian rule.

The Jordanian census of 1961 found 328 inhabitants in Judeira.

=== Post-1967 ===
Since the Six-Day War in 1967, al-Judeira has been under Israeli occupation.

After the 1995 accords, 25.4% of the village’s land was classified as Area B, the remaining 74.6% is classified was Area C.

In 2005, Israel started the construction of a separation barrier around al-Judeira, Al Jib, Bir Nabala, Beit Hanina al-Balad and Kalandiya. The wall was built on Palestinian land seized by Military Orders. The wall completely surrounds the villages, forming an enclave.

== Bibliography ==
- Barron, J. B., ed. (1923). Palestine: Report and General Abstracts of the Census of 1922. Government of Palestine.
- Conder, C.R.; Kitchener, H.H. (1883). The Survey of Western Palestine: Memoirs of the Topography, Orography, Hydrography, and Archaeology. Vol. 3. London: Committee of the Palestine Exploration Fund. (p. 43)
- Government of Jordan, Department of Statistics (1964). First Census of Population and Housing. Volume I: Final Tables; General Characteristics of the Population (PDF).
- Government of Palestine, Department of Statistics (1945). Village Statistics, April, 1945.
- Guérin, V. (1868). Description Géographique Historique et Archéologique de la Palestine (in French). Vol. 1: Judee, pt. 1. Paris: L'Imprimerie Nationale.
- Hadawi, S. (1970). Village Statistics of 1945: A Classification of Land and Area ownership in Palestine. Palestine Liberation Organization Research Center. Archived from the original on 2018-12-08.
- Hartmann, M. (1883). "Die Ortschaftenliste des Liwa Jerusalem in dem türkischen Staatskalender für Syrien auf das Jahr 1288 der Flucht (1871)". Zeitschrift des Deutschen Palästina-Vereins. 6: 102–149.
- Mills, E., ed. (1932). Census of Palestine 1931. Population of Villages, Towns and Administrative Areas. Jerusalem: Government of Palestine.
- Palmer, E.H. (1881). The Survey of Western Palestine: Arabic and English Name Lists Collected During the Survey by Lieutenants Conder and Kitchener, R. E. Transliterated and Explained by E.H. Palmer. Committee of the Palestine Exploration Fund.
- Robinson, E.; Smith, E. (1841). Biblical Researches in Palestine, Mount Sinai and Arabia Petraea: A Journal of Travels in the year 1838. Vol. 2. Boston: Crocker & Brewster.
- Robinson, E.; Smith, E. (1841). Biblical Researches in Palestine, Mount Sinai and Arabia Petraea: A Journal of Travels in the year 1838. Vol. 3. Boston: Crocker & Brewster.
- Socin, A. (1879). "Alphabetisches Verzeichniss von Ortschaften des Paschalik Jerusalem". Zeitschrift des Deutschen Palästina-Vereins. 2: 135–163.
- Toledano, E. (1984). "The Sanjaq of Jerusalem in the Sixteenth Century: Aspects of Topography and Population". Archivum Ottomanicum. 9: 279–319. Archived from the original on 2016-03-05.
