= Majdalawi =

Majdalawi is an adjective from Arabic used to describe people or things from several places named Majdal:

- Majdalawi weaving, a weaving tradition for which the town of Al-Majdal, Asqalan was renown
- Jamil Majdalawi, a Palestinian activist born in Simsim in the district of Al-Majdal, Asqalan
- Mary Magdalene, whose name is Arabic is Maryam al-Majdalawi as she was from the town of Magdala
