= Nabulsi =

Nabulsi (Arabic: نابلسي, romanized: nābulusī) may refer to people or things from Nablus, a city in Nablus Governorate, Palestine; particularly:

- Nabulsi soap
- Nabulsi cheese
- Knafeh, also known as knafe nabulsiyye, a traditional pastry made with Nabulsi cheese.

Notable people with the surname Nabulsi include:

- Abd al-Ghani al-Nabulsi (1641–1731), Muslim scholar from Ottoman Empire
- Abdel Salam Al Nabulsy (1899–1968), Egyptian actor of Palestinian origin
- Abu Amr Uthman ibn al-Nabulusi (1192–1262), administrator in Ayyubid Egypt
- Abu Bakr al-Nabulsi (d. 973/974), Palestinian Sunni Muslim scholar and jurist
- Adham Nabulsi (born 1993), Palestinian-Jordanian singer
- Farah Nabulsi, British-Palestinian film director, screenwriter, producer and human rights advocate
- Ibrahim al-Nabulsi (2003–2022), Palestinian militant
- Karma Nabulsi, Oxford academic
- Mohammed Rateb al-Nabulsi (born 1939), Syrian writer and Muslim scholar
- Mohammed Said Nabulsi (1928–2013), Jordanian banker, economist and politician
- Mohammad Salameh Al Nabulsi, Jordanian politica
- Nabila El-Nabulsi (1949–2010), Syrian actress
- Omar Nimr Nabulsi (born 1936), Jordanian diplomat and politician
- Shaker Al-Nabulsi (1940–2014), Jordanian-American author
- Suleiman Nabulsi (1908–1976), Jordanian politician
