= Al Jib jar handles =

Sketch of the Al Jib Gibeon inscription number 61

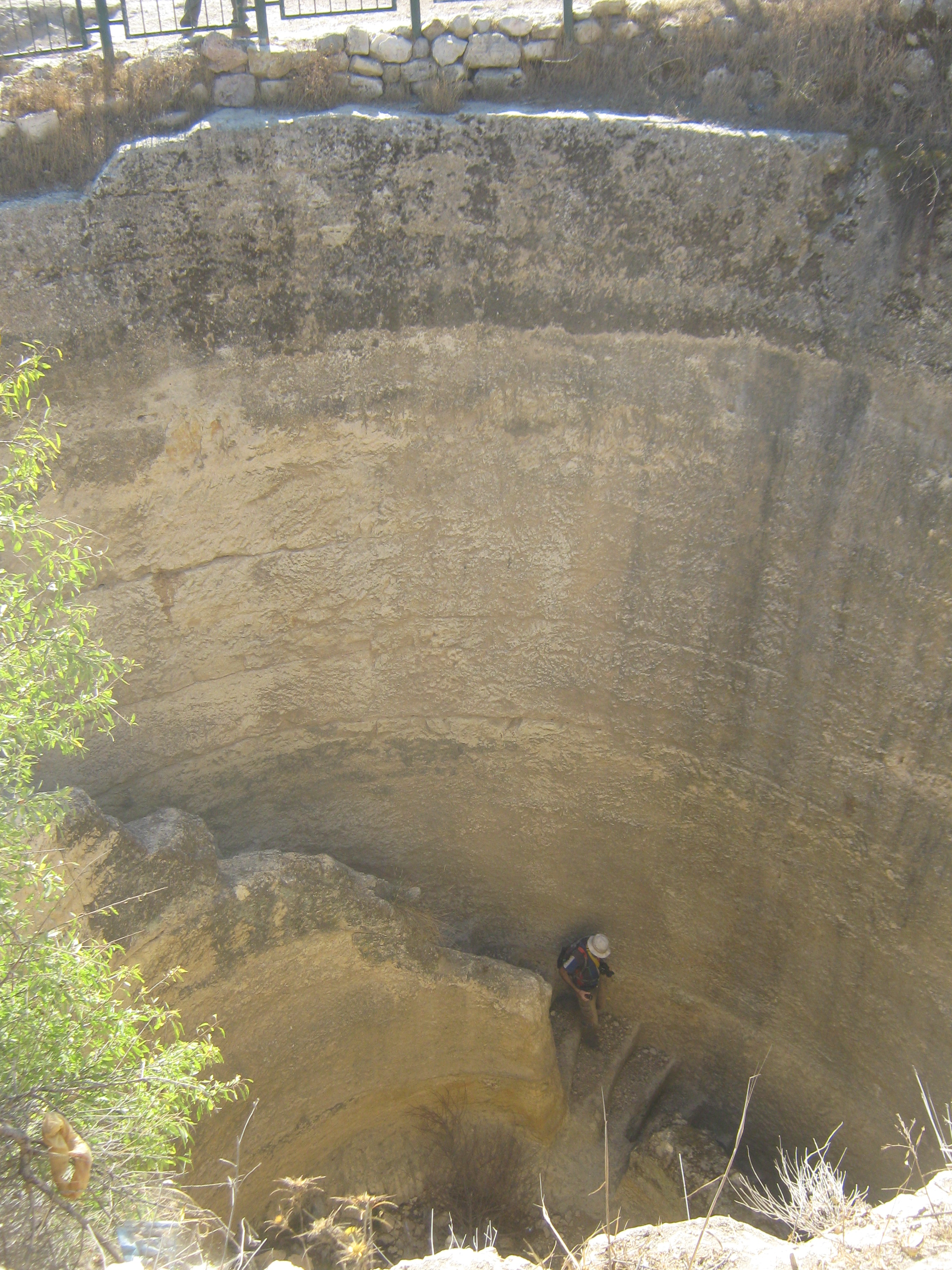
The "Pool of Gibeon", where the inscriptions were found

The Al Jib jar handles are over 60 jar handles inscribed with names including the Semitic triliteral gb'n, discovered between 1956 and 1959 in excavations led by James B. Pritchard at the "great pool" (or step well) of the Palestinian town of Al Jib. This excludes approximately 80 handles found in the same location with the LMLK seal inscription which has been found elsewhere across the region. The discovery was the largest number of inscriptions found anywhere in Palestine since the Samaria ostraca in 1908-10.

The discovery was a landmark in biblical archaeology, as the handles were mostly found in a large pool matching the biblical description, with many having the inscription גבען (GBʻN). This was considered to have secured the identification of Al Jib with Biblical Gibeon; it has been described as "as strong a site identification... as anyone ever is likely to find in biblical archaeology". The scholarly excitement which followed the discovery increased the perceived importance of Gibeon in the modern understanding of Biblical history, and led to confusion with other similar biblical place names.

The jar handles were divided between the Jordan Archaeological Museum and the Penn Museum.

== Description ==
=== Overview ===
The 1956 and 1957 excavations discovered in the debris 56 inscribed jar handles, 80 jar handles with LMLK seals, eight private seal impressions, and one inscribed weight. Further inscribed handles were discovered later, bringing the total to above 60. All the inscribed handles were recovered from the top 7.6 meters of debris.

Many of the inscribed handles included names in the inscriptions; these compared against genealogical lists in the Book of Chronicles, and were concluded to include a mixture of Israelite and non-Israelite names.

Most of the handles found show a standard inscription: gb'n gdr followed by one of the following proper names 'zryhw, 'amryhw, dml', hnnyhw nr', or šb'l. Sometimes a dot is used as word divider. The translation of the word gdr was debated by scholars; Pritchard proposed it to mean a walled vineyard enclosure, by comparison with Numbers 22: 24-25 and Isaiah 5:5.

=== Discovery ===
Pritchard described the first set of findings in 1956 as follows:

The debris with which the pool had been filled contained the most important objects found during the 1956 season. Mud, stones, and pieces of broken pottery had washed down from the hill above after the city’s destruction about 600 B.C. As in other areas of the excavation all pottery was salvaged by workmen, put into carefully labeled baskets, washed, and examined at the tent. The pool alone yielded on the average a dozen baskets of broken fragments a day. After we had looked over what could be roughly estimated as 35,000 fragments of pottery, there appeared a broken jar handle carefully and clearly inscribed with the letters GB’N in the Hebrew script of the 8th-7th centuries B.C. and two unintelligible letters... A day later there came from another basket a piece of the same handle giving in Hebrew letters a man’s name... Some days later, also from the debris of the pool, came another “Gibeon” handle even better preserved and containing in addition to the name of the town the word gdd... All the inscribed material came from the debris which had washed down the hill into the pool. This sample of significant evidence is a token, we trust, of the wealth of interesting detail which awaits the excavator of the slope immediately above.

Pritchard described the larger set of discoveries in 1957 as follows:

In the 1956 season at el-Jib we had the good fortune of finding four inscribed jar handles in the tons of debris which we took from half the area of the pool down to a depth of 10.50 meters. It was reasonable to suppose that the other half of the filling might contain as many Hebrew inscriptions. To our surprise, fifty-two more examples of inscriptions on the same type of jar handle appeared-the largest number of Hebrew inscriptions to appear from any Palestinian site since the discovery of ostraca at Samaria in 1908-1910... All but one of these new inscriptions came from about three meters of the debris of the pool (the levels of 4.45 to 7.60 meters below the rim of the pool)... The possibility of importation was soon dispelled in the 1957 season by the finding of twenty-four additional handles containing the name “Gibeon,” spelled out in good Hebrew. Following the place name there is usually the word gdr, which was misread in 1956 as gdd, and then a name of a person.

== Relevance to place names in Palestine / Israel ==
Pritchard wrote in 1959 that of the thousands of ancient place names in Palestine known by name from the Hebrew Bible and historical sources, this was only the fourth that had then been connected using inscriptions found during archaeological excavations at the respective locations. The vast majority of place-name identifications (see list of modern names for biblical place names) are made upon their similarity to existing Palestinian Arabic place names, or else upon the assessment of other geographical information provided by the Biblical texts. Since then, the Ekron Royal Dedicatory Inscription has been found with the name Ekron.

== Publications ==
The discovery helped establish Pritchard's reputation; Prichard cataloged the finds in Hebrew Inscriptions and Stamps From Gibeon (1959), which also included the first in-depth discussion of concentric-circle incisions on jar handles associated with LMLK seals. He also published articles on their production of wine, the rock-cut wine cellars, and the engineered water conduits for water supply, and interpreted all this for a general audience in Gibeon: Where the Sun Stood Still (1962).

== Bibliography ==
=== Primary sources ===
- Editio princeps (1-56): Pritchard, J.B. (1959). Hebrew Inscriptions and Stamps from Gibeon. Museum Monographs - University of Pennsylvania. University Museum. University Museum, University of Pennsylvania. ISBN 978-0-598-09648-7.
- (57-61) Pritchard, James B. “More Inscribed Jar Handles from El-Jîb.” Bulletin of the American Schools of Oriental Research, no. 160, 1960, pp. 2–6, https://doi.org/10.2307/1355641
- Pritchard, James (1957). "DISCOVERY OF THE BIBLICAL GIBEON". Museum Bulletin. XXI (1): 3–26.
- Pritchard, James (1958). "A Second Excavation at Gibeon". University Museum Bulletin. XXII: 13–24.
- Pritchard, James (1959). "THE WINE INDUSTRY AT GIBEON: 1959 Discoveries". Expedition. 2 (1): 17–25.
- Pritchard, J.B. (1962). Gibeon, Where the Sun Stood Still: The Discovery of the Biblical City. Princeton Studies on the Near East. Princeton University Press. ISBN 978-1-4008-4318-3.
- Frick, Frank S. (1974). "Another Inscribed Jar Handle from El-Jîb". Bulletin of the American Schools of Oriental Research. 213 (213). University of Chicago Press: 46–48. doi:10.2307/1356082. ISSN 0003-097X. JSTOR 1356082. S2CID 163401297.

=== Secondary sources ===
- AVIGAD, N. Review of Some Notes on the Hebrew Inscriptions from Gibeon (Review-article), by James B. Pritchard. Israel Exploration Journal 9, no. 2 (1959): 130–33. http://www.jstor.org/stable/27924777.
- Cleveland, Ray L. (1960-01-01). "Hebrew Inscriptions and Stamps from Gibeon. By James B. Pritchard". American Journal of Archaeology. 64 (1). University of Chicago Press: 87. doi:10.2307/502429. hdl:2027/mdp.39015030577434. ISSN 0002-9114. JSTOR 502429.
- Heller, J. (Book Review) "James B. Pritchard," Hebrew Inscriptions and Stamps from Gibeon, Archiv Orientální; Praha Vol. 28, Iss. 1, (Jan 1, 1960): 150.
- Toombs, Lawrence E.; Pritchard, James B. (1960). "Hebrew Inscriptions and Stamps from Gibeon". Journal of Biblical Literature. 79 (3). JSTOR: 287. doi:10.2307/3263940. hdl:2027/mdp.39015030577434. ISSN 0021-9231. JSTOR 3263940.
