= Abu Bakr al-Nabulsi =

Palestinian Islamic scholar

Abū Bakr al-Nabulsi
- Title: Shahīd Ibn al-Nablusi

Personal life
- Born: Ramla or Nablus
- Died: c. 973 Damascus, Fatimid Caliphate
- Era: Early Middle Ages

Religious life
- Religion: Sunni Islam

Abū Bakr al-Nabulsi (d. 973 or 974), full name Abū Bakr Muḥammad ibn ʾAḥmad ibn Sahl bin Naṣīr ar-Ramli (Arabic: محمد بن أحمد بن سهل بن نصر أبو بكر الرملي) was a Sunni Muslim scholar and jurist of Palestinian descent who opposed the rule of the Fatimids. He was arrested and then executed by flaying after the city of Damascus had entered Fatimid rule in 971.

== Arrest and execution ==
Abu Bakr al-Nabulsi fled to Damascus when the anti-Sunni Fatimids took control of Jerusalem. He gave a speech against the Fatimid ruler al-Mu'izz li-Din Allah, vilifying him by saying that he was worse than the Byzantine Empire (which controlled Anatolia at the time). After the Fatimids conquered the city of Damascus in 971, al-Nabulsi was placed under arrest by the new governor Abu Mahmud al-Kutami and brought to the caliph al-Mu'izz li-Din Allah, who had heard of the insult said against him. The caliph tried to force al-Nabulsi to retract his statement, but al-Nabulsi was extremely insistent; leading the caliph to give an order to execute him.

Abu Bakr al-Nabulsi was executed by flaying. The Fatimids hired a Jewish butcher as his executioner. Reportedly, al-Nabulsi was in such pain while his skin was being sliced off but kept his patience, until his executioner felt pity for him and drove the blade directly into his heart to ensure he died quickly. His death was recorded as being in 363 of the Hijri calendar, which is either 973 or 974 in the standard Gregorian calendar.

== See also ==
- List of Muslim scholars
