= Gibeon (ancient city) =

Biblical-era city north of Jerusalem

- גִּבְעוֹן (Hebrew)
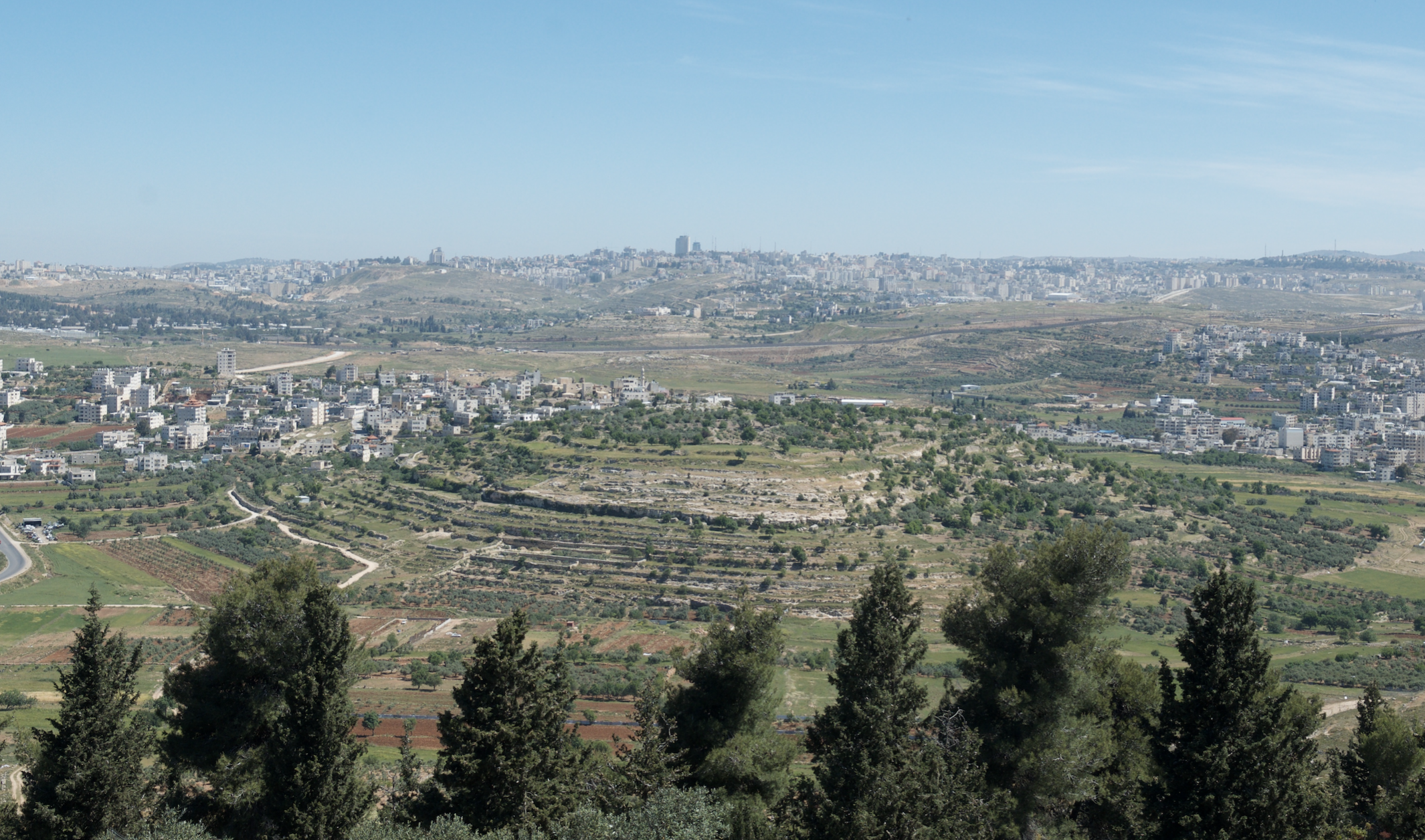

- Location within the West Bank
- 31°50′51″N 35°11′11″E
- Periods: Bronze Age, Iron Age, Hellenistic Period, Roman Period
- Cultures: Canaanite, Israelite
- Location: Al Jib
- Region: West Bank

Site notes
- Excavation dates: 1956–1962
- Archaeologists: James B. Pritchard
- Condition: In ruins

Gibeon (Hebrew: גִּבְעוֹן, romanized: Giḇəʻōn; Ancient Greek: Γαβαών, romanized: Gabaōn) was a Canaanite and later an Israelite city, which was located north of Jerusalem. According to Joshua 11:19, the pre-Israelite-conquest inhabitants, the Gibeonites, were Hivites; according to 2 Samuel 21:2, they were Amorites, there can be also expected that they were a mingled people, since the city of Jerusalem (whose king discovered the alliance in the narrative of the book of Joshua Joshua 10:1) has her nativity disclosed in Ezekiel 16:3. The remains of Gibeon are located in the southern portion of the Arab-majority village of al-Jib in Area C of the West Bank.

== Biblical account ==
=== Canaanite city ===
After the destruction of Jericho and Ai, the Hivite people of Gibeon sent ambassadors to trick Joshua and the Israelites into making a treaty with them. According to the writer of the book of Deuteronomy (Deut 7:1–2; 20:16–20), the Israelites were commanded to kill all non-Israelite Canaanites in the land. The Gibeonites presented themselves as ambassadors from a distant, powerful land. Without consulting God (Joshua 9:14), the Israelites entered into a covenant or peace treaty with the Gibeonites. The Israelites soon found out that the Gibeonites were actually their neighbors—living within three days' walk of them (Joshua 9:17)—and Joshua realised that he had been deceived. He kept the letter of his covenant with the Gibeonites, however, to let them live in exchange for their servitude: they were assigned as woodcutters and water carriers and condemned (or cursed) to work forever in these trades (Joshua 9:3–27). Theologian John Gill suggests that this curse was a particular example of Noah's curse on Canaan.

In retaliation for allying with the Israelites, the city was later besieged by a coalition of five other Amorite kings led by Adonizedek, king of Jerusalem, along with Hoham of Hebron, Piram of Jarmuth, Japhia of Lachish, and Debir of Eglon. The Gibeonites appealed to Joshua, who led the subsequent victory over the Amorites amid miraculous circumstances, including deadly hailstones and the suspension of the movement of the Sun and Moon, until the Amorites were completely defeated (Joshua 10:1–15).

=== Israelite city ===
In the Book of Joshua, ancient Gibeon is described as "a large city, like one of the royal cities" located in the tribal territory of Benjamin (Joshua 18:25). It was given as a Levitical city (Joshua 21:17).

In the first Book of Chronicles, Jeiel is mentioned as the "father of Gibeon" and is an ancestor of King Saul.

Following the capture of the Ark of the Covenant by the Philistines, the remaining part of the Tabernacle was moved from Shiloh to the "great high place" in Gibeon (1 Samuel 4:1–22, 1 Chronicles 21:29).

2 Samuel 21:2 indicates that King Saul pursued the Gibeonites and sought to kill them off "in his zeal for the children of Israel and Judah" (2 Samuel 21:5). His anger at the Gibeonites was not personal hatred, but was induced by zeal for the welfare of the Israelites. Following Saul's death, fighting between the soldiers of Joab and those of Abner took place beside the Pool of Gibeon (2 Samuel 2:12). In this area, King David conquered the Philistines (2 Samuel 5:25 and 1 Chronicles 14:16).

David then became the king of the United Monarchy. Much later, after the death of his rebellious son Absalom and his restoration to the throne, the kingdom of Israel was visited by a three-year drought, which led David to ask God what was wrong. The drought was then revealed to be divine judgement against King Saul's decision to completely exterminate the Gibeonites (2 Samuel 21:1), in his "zeal for Israel and Judah". The blame for this genocide is also attributed to Saul's family. This event is not itself recorded in the biblical narrative, although Gill refers to a Jewish tradition linking this slaughter to the slaughter of the priests at Nob (1 Samuel 22:6–19). The culpability of Saul's family in the genocide could also imply that it wasn't a singular event. David asked the surviving Gibeonites what he could offer to make amends. In retribution, they asked for seven of Saul's male descendants to be given to them to kill, seven signalling the sign of completion. David handed over Armoni and Mephibosheth, two of the sons of Saul and the five sons of Merab (Saul's daughter) to the Gibeonites, who hanged them. He saved Jonathan's son, also called Mephibosheth, from this peril because of his covenant with Jonathan (2 Samuel 21:1–9). Amasa was also killed here (2 Samuel 20:8).

On his accession to kingship, King David's son Solomon met with all of the kingdom of Israel's leaders at Gibeon and offered 1,000 burnt offerings (1 Kings 3:4, 2 Chronicles 1:6). On this occasion, God appeared to him in a dream (1 Kings 3:5) and granted him wisdom (1 Kings 3:12, 2 Chronicles 1:7–12).

Hananiah, son of Azzur, came from this city (Jeremiah 28:1).

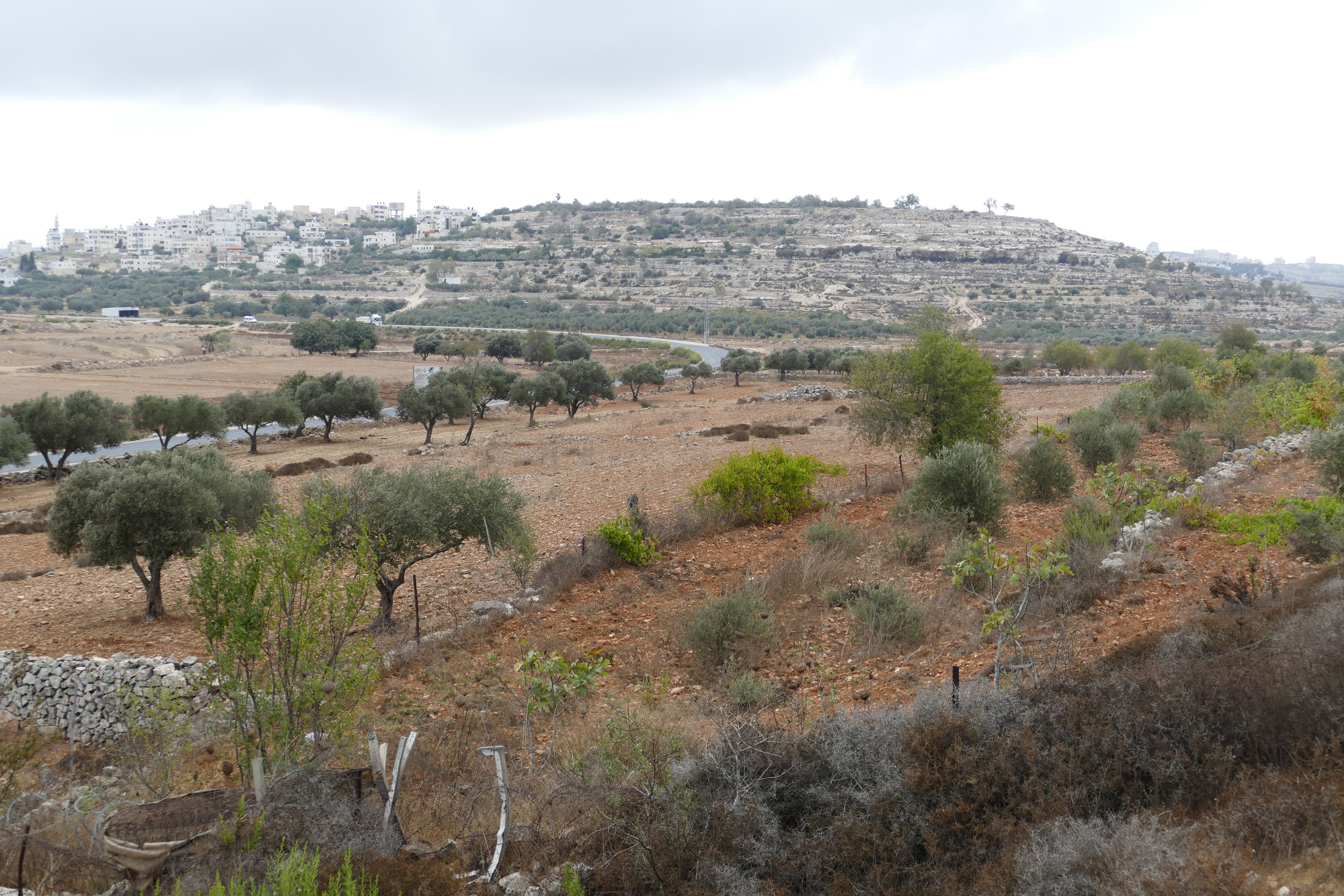
Track to ancient Gibeon, the hill that appears in the center of the image. The modern village of al-Jib appears in the upper left, on the slopes of the ancient hill

After the exile of the Israelites to Babylon, Gibeon belonged to Judea. Gibeon is mentioned in the Book of Nehemiah as one of the towns resettled by the Jewish exiles returning from the Babylonian captivity and who helped to construct the walls of Jerusalem during the reign of Artaxerxes I (Xerxes). Nehemiah further records that those returnees were the very descendants of the people who had formerly resided in the town before their banishment from the country, who had all returned to live in their former places of residence.

==== Significance ====
1 Chronicles 16:39 suggests that worship before the tabernacle at Gibeon continued alongside worship in Jerusalem after David brought the Ark of the Covenant back there, although "nothing ... is said of this in the Books of Samuel". Theologian Hans-Peter Mathys notes, "no other OT book mentions a regular (sacrificial) cult in Gibeon. Its historical authenticity is sometimes supported by the argument that 1 Kings 3:3 ("Solomon ... went to Gibeon to sacrifice there; for that was the great high place; a thousand burnt offerings did Solomon offer upon that altar") confirms its existence and speaks out against it. These four verses, though, were more likely conceived by the Chronicler, [who] ... is at pains to portray an uninterrupted and legitimate (sacrificial) cult spanning the entire period from the desert era (with its tabernacle), including the LORD's residence at Gibeon, right up to Solomon's establishment of the temple in Jerusalem."

== In Jewish law ==
In regard to the Gibeonites and the killing of seven descendants of King Saul: According to the Babylonian Talmud: "...As to the nethinim, however, let them be summoned and we shall pacify them. Immediately the king called the Gibeonites, and said unto them ... 'What shall I do for you? and wherewith should I make atonement, that ye may bless the inheritance of the Lord'? And the Gibeonites said to him: 'It is no matter of silver or gold between us and Saul, or his house,' neither is it for us [to put] any man etc. ... Let seven men of his sons be delivered unto us and we will hang them up unto the Lord etc.' He tried to pacify them but they would not be pacified. Thereupon he said to them: This nation is distinguished by three characteristics: They are merciful, bashful and benevolent. 'Merciful', for it is written, And shew thee mercy, and have compassion upon thee, and multiply thee. 'Bashful', for it is written, That His fear may be before you. 'Benevolent', for it is written, That he may command his children and his household etc. Only he who cultivates these three characteristics is fit to join this nation. But the king took the two sons of Rizpah the daughter of Aiah, whom she bore into Saul, Armoni and Mephibosheth; and the five sons of Michal the daughter of Saul, whom she bore to Adriel the son of Barzillai the Meholathite. Why just these? — R. Huna replied: They were made to pass before the Holy Ark. He whom the Ark retained [was condemned] to death and he whom the Ark did not retain was saved alive.

R. Hana b. Kattina raised an objection: But the king spared Mephibosheth, the son of Jonathan the son of Saul! — He did not allow him to pass. Was there favouritism then! — In fact he did let him pass and it retained him, but he invoked on his behalf divine mercy and it released him. But here, too, favouritism is involved!, — The fact, however, is that he invoked divine mercy that the Ark should not retain him. But, surely, it is written, The fathers shall not be put to death for the children etc.! — R. Hiyya b. Abba replied in the name of R. Johanan: It is better that a letter be rooted out of the Torah than that the Divine name shall be publicly profaned. And Rizpah the daughter of Aiah took sackcloth, and spread it for her upon the rock, from the beginning of harvest until water was poured upon them from heaven; and she suffered neither the birds of the air to rest on then by day, nor the beast of the field by night. But, surely, it is written, His body shall not remain all night upon the tree! — R. Johanan replied in the name of R. Simeon b. Jehozadak: It is proper that a letter be rooted out of the Torah so that thereby the heavenly name shall be publicly hallowed. For passers-by were enquiring, 'What kind of men are these?' — 'These are royal princes' — 'And what have they done?' — 'They laid their hands upon unattached strangers' — Then they exclaimed: 'There is no nation in existence which one ought to join as much as this one. If [the punishment of] royal princes was so great. how much more that of common people; and if such [was the justice done for] unattached proselytes, how much more so for Israelites

A hundred and fifty thousand men immediately joined Israel; as it is said, And Solomon had threescore and ten thousand that bore burdens, and fourscore thousand that were hewers in the mountain. Might not these have been Israelites? — This cannot be assumed, for it is written, But of the children of Israel did Solomon make no bondservants. But that might have represented mere public service! — [The deduction,] however, [is made] from the following: And Solomon numbered all the strangers that were in the Land of Israel, etc. And they were found a hundred and fifty thousand etc. And he set threescore and ten thousand of them to bear burdens, and fourscore thousand to be hewers in the mountains.

Was it David, however, who issued the decree of prohibition against the nethinim? Moses, surely, issued that decree, for it is written, from the hewer of thy wood to the drawer of thy water! — Moses issued a decree against that generation only while David issued a decree against all generations.

But Joshua, in fact, issued the decree against them, for it is written, And Joshua made them that day hewers of wood and drawers of water for the congregation, and for the altar of the Lord! — Joshua made his decree for the period during which the Sanctuary was in existence while David made his decree for the time during which the Sanctuary was not in existence.

In Rabbinic Judaism, the alleged descendants of the Gibeonites, known as Natinim, are treated differently from ordinary Jews. They may not, for example, marry a Jew by birth. However, a Natin may marry Mamzerim and Gerim. The men of Gibeon, with Melatiah the Gibeonite at their head, repaired a piece of the wall of Jerusalem near the old gate on the west side of the city (Nehemiah 3:7), while the Nethinim dwelt at Ophel on the east side (Nehemiah 3:26). At the time of Nehemiah and Ezra, they were fully integrated into the Judean community, and were signatories to the former's covenant. Several centuries later, their status had declined rapidly. In the 10 genealogical classes (yuhasin) set forth in the Mishnah, they are ranked above shetukim (people of whose paternity is unknown) and assufim (foundlings) but beneath mamzerim, the offspring of illicit unions, and were prohibited from marrying Israellites of good standing, though intermarriage between the last four classes, which included freed slaves, was permitted. A child of such illicit unions was defined as a natin. Whereas the Biblical prohibitions against intermarriage with the Moabites, Ammonites, Egyptians and Edomites only applied for a certain number of generations or did not apply at all to their daughters, the ban on marriage with Mamzerim and Nethinim was deemed "perpetual and applies both to males and females".

== Archaeology ==
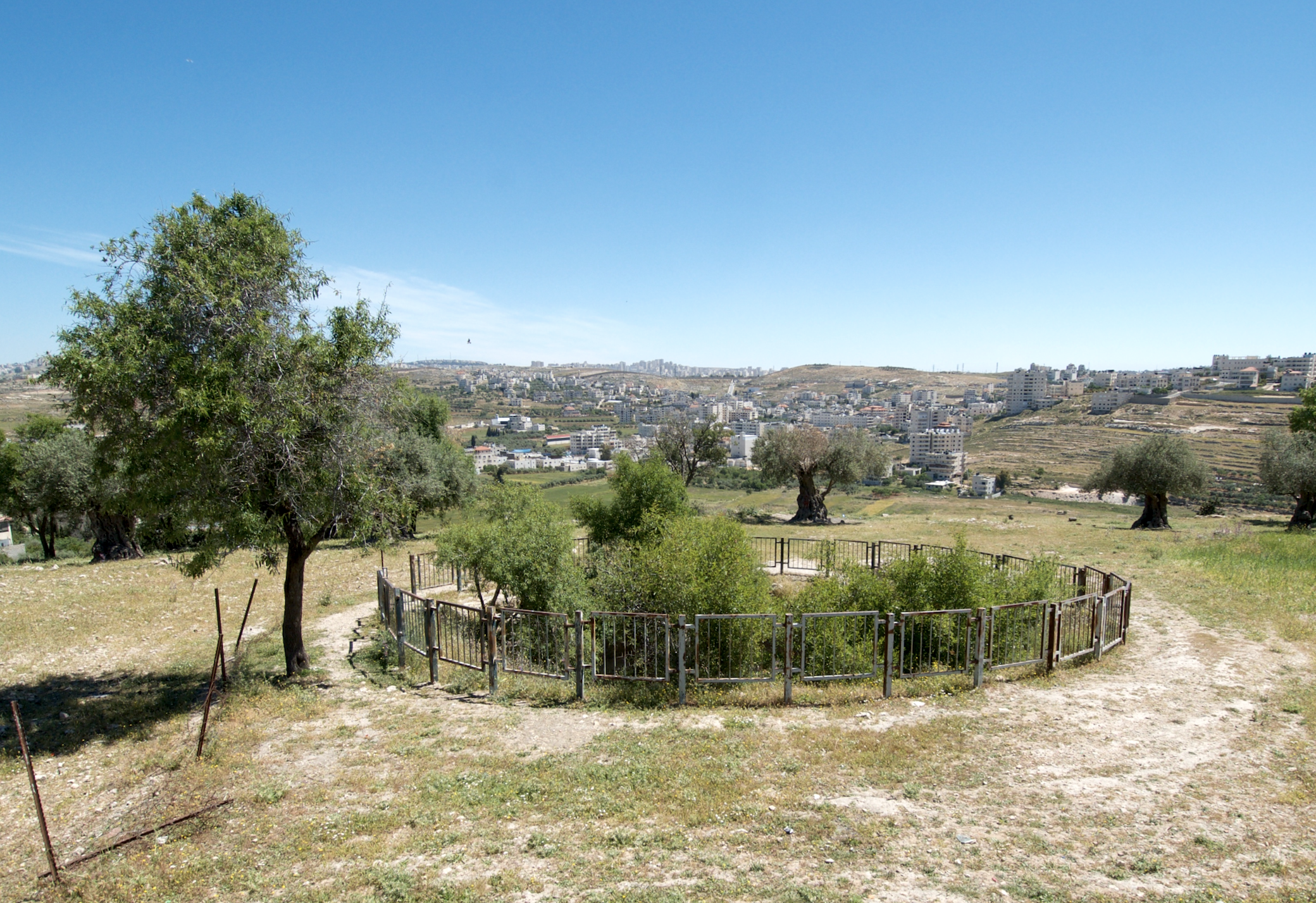
The Pool of Gibeon

N29 G29 O29 N35 G1 N25 or N29 G29 O29 D36 N35 G1 N25
ḳbꜣꜥꜣnꜣ
in hieroglyphs
Era: 3rd Intermediate Period
(1069–664 BC)

The earliest known mention of Gibeon in an extra-biblical source is in a list of cities on the wall of the Amun temple at Karnak, celebrating the invasion of Israel by Egyptian Pharaoh Shoshenq I (945–924 BCE). Josephus placed Gibeon at 40 furlongs from Jerusalem. The 10th-century lexicographer David ben Abraham al-Fasi, identified al-Jib with the ancient city Gibeon, which view was corroborated also by the Hebrew Lexicon compiled by Wilhelm Gesenius and Frants Buhl ("now al-Ǧīb"). The first identification of al-Jib with the ancient Canaanite city of Gibeon was made by Frantz Ferdinand von Troilo in 1666, and later adopted by Edward Robinson in 1838 in his Biblical Researches in Palestine. Later discovery of the Al Jib jar handles added weight to this identification. The remains of Gibeon were excavated in six expeditions from 1956 to 1962, led by the University of Pennsylvania archaeologist James B. Pritchard.

=== Early Bronze Age ===
Gibeon was founded in the Early Bronze Age (EB, c. 3300– 2000 BCE), for the excavators discovered 14 EB storage jars beneath the foundations of the Iron Age wall. Other EB remains were discovered at the top of the tell, but the stratigraphy had been destroyed by British gunfire during the First World War. It is probable that there was a defensive wall, but this has not yet been found. Tombs cut into the rock on the east site of the hill contained EB jars and bowls, formed first by hand and then finished on a slow wheel. The Early Bronze city was destroyed by fire, but no date has been determined for this destruction.

=== Middle Bronze Age ===
Permanent settlements in Gibeon appeared in Middle Bronze Age I-II.

=== Late Bronze Age ===
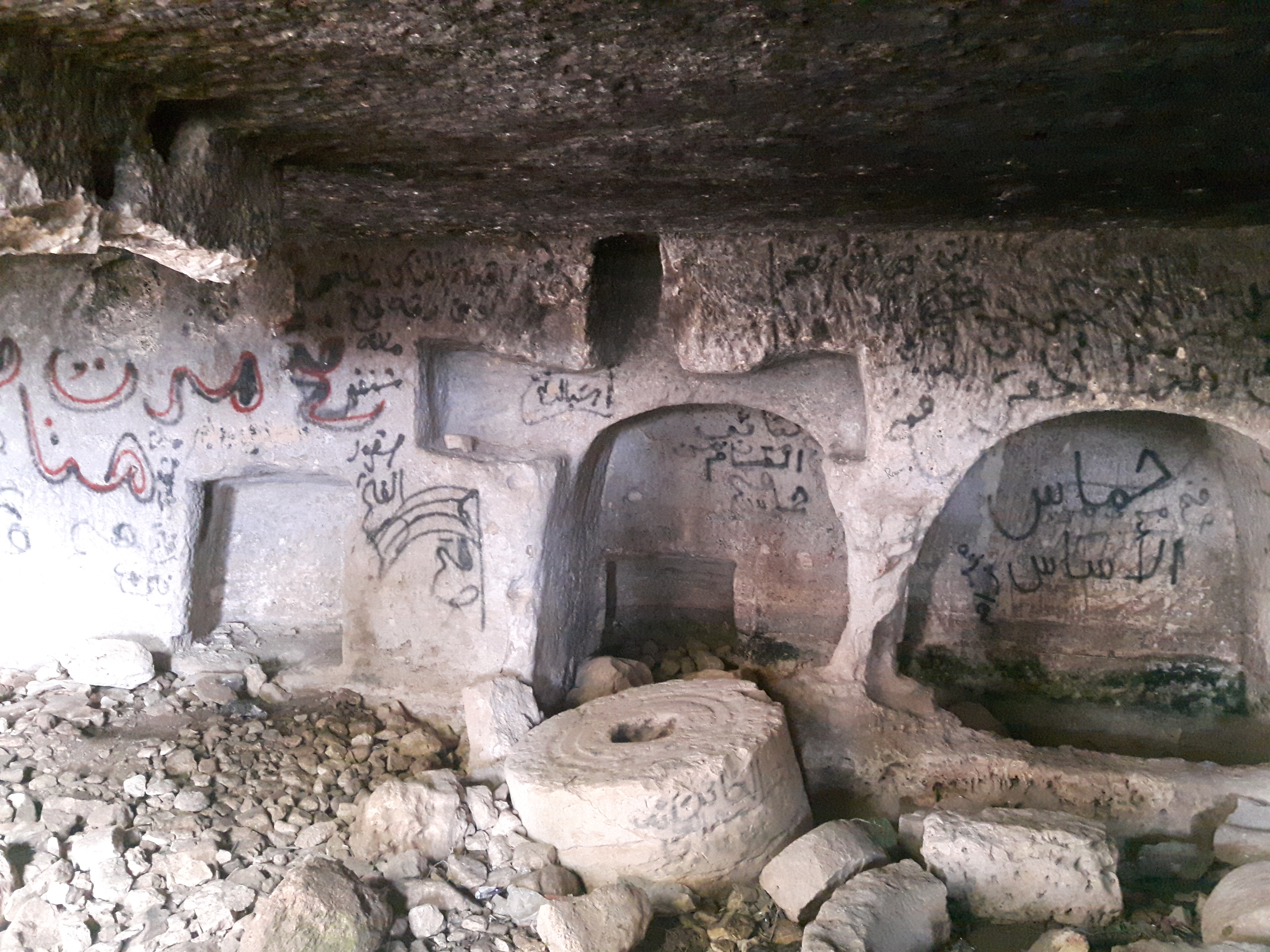
oil press cave

No trace of a Late Bronze Age city has been found. Only seven tombs are known from the period, but they nevertheless point to a degree of sophistication, as they contained imported Cypriote ware and local potters attempted to copy Mycenaean and Cypriote pottery. It would appear that some, at least, of these tombs had been cut during earlier periods and were being reused. Pritchard suggested that somewhere in an area not touched by his four-year dig, remains of the Bronze Age "great city" from the Book of Joshua might still be found.

=== Iron Age I ===
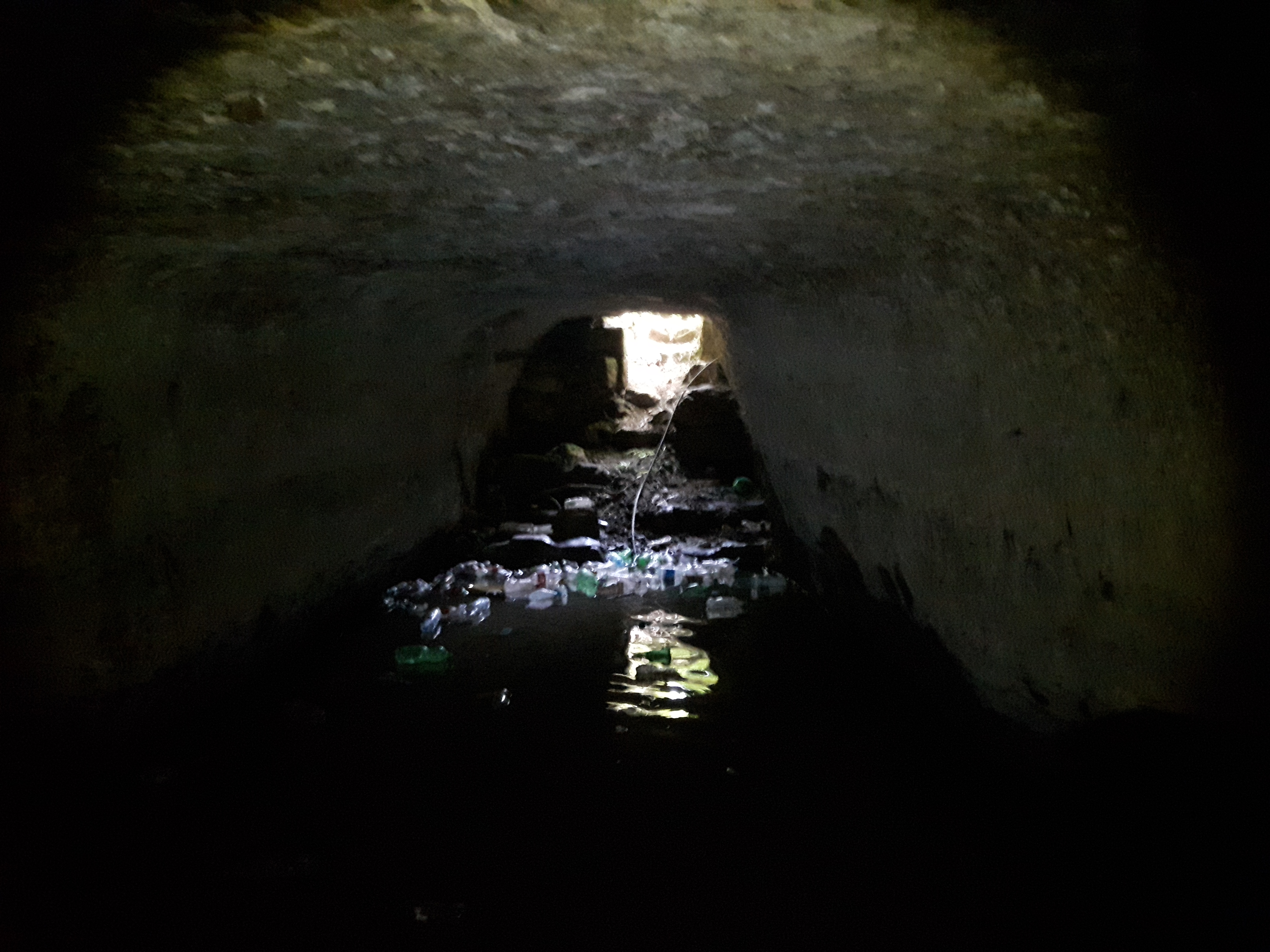
The spring water at Gibeon

During Iron I (c. 1200-1000 BC), a massive wall was constructed around the crown of the hill and a huge pool was cut in the living rock just inside the wall. In a first phase it was cut with a diameter of 11.8 m to a depth of 10.8 m, with a spiral staircase of 79 steps cut into the walls of the pool, and in a second phase a tunnel was added that continues downwards to a water chamber 24 m below the level of the city. It is possible, but cannot be proven, that this structure is the "pool of Gibeon" of 2 Samuel 2:13.

=== Iron Age II ===
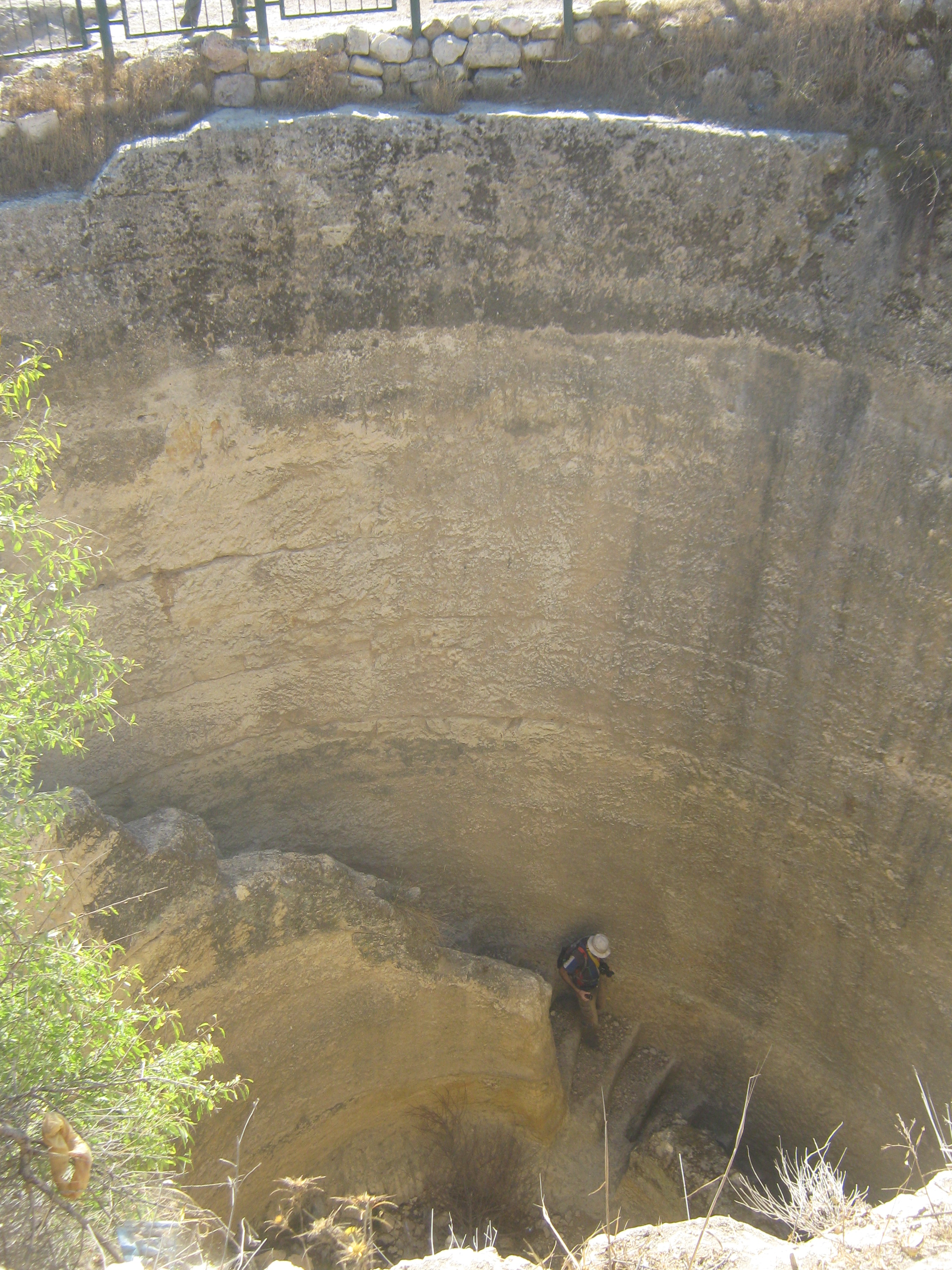
Gibeon well

==== Kingdom of Yehuda ====
In Iron Age II, another tunnel of 93 steps was constructed to a better water source below the city starting from a point near the pool. A second access point to this source from the base of the hill is still in use today.

Gibeon flourished during the late Iron Age II, when the city had large fortifications, a large wine industry and an advanced water system. To the east of the tell, a lavish cemetery of the same period was discovered.

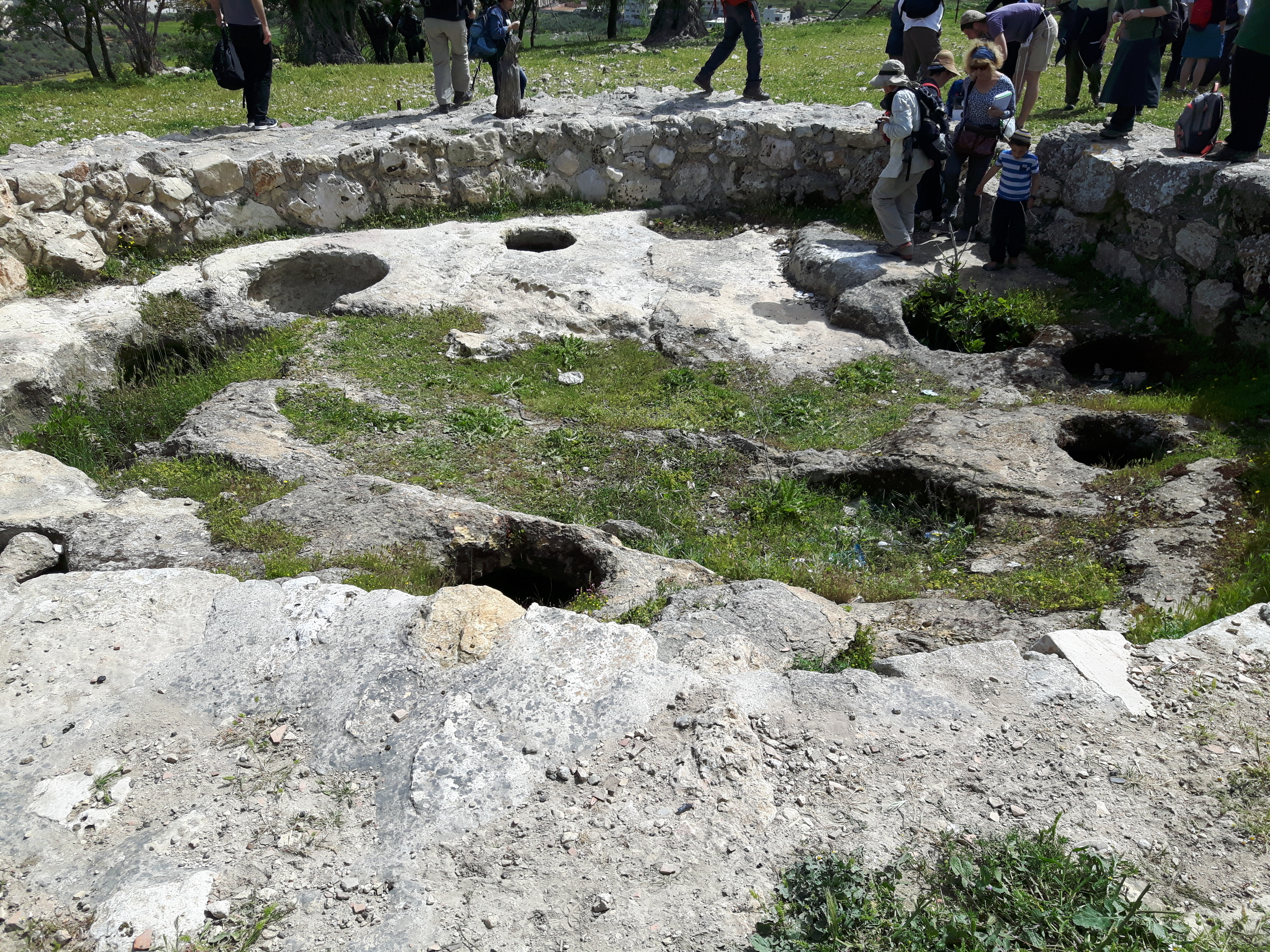
Rock-cut 2 meter deep wine cellars

The flat and fertile land with many springs which surrounds it gave rise to a flourishing economy, attested to in the large number of ancient jars and wine cellars discovered there. The jars could hold 45 litres of wine each and 66 wine cellars two meters deep and dug out of rock have been unearthed in Jib.

In the 8th and 7th century BCE there was a considerable wine industry there; cellars with room for 95,000 liters of wine have been found. Impressive among these finds are sixty-three wine cellars. Hebrew inscriptions of גבען (GBʻN) on the handles of wine storage jars, most of which were excavated from a large pool matching the biblical description, made the identification of Gibeon secure and a landmark product of biblical archaeology. Pritchard published articles on their production of wine, the Hebrew inscriptions, the rock-cut wine cellars, and the well engineered water conduits that supplied the city water.

=== Classical Age ===
From the 6th to the beginning of the 1st century BCE, there is scant evidence of occupation. Gibeon was possibly a dependency of Jerusalem, and was probably not fortified at the time.

==== Hellenistic period ====
Potsherds and coinage from the Late Hellenistic from the time of Antiochus III.

At a nearby ruin, built on the southern slope of a ridge at the western side of the al-Jib highland, archaeologists discovered a Hellenistic-Second Temple period dwelling, in which were found a plastered ritual bath with three descending staircases and an industrial zone with lime kilns.

==== Hasmonean period ====
Finds also date to the Hasmonean and the time of John Hyrcanus.

==== Roman period ====
During the Roman period there was considerable building, including stepped baths and water conduits.

During the early phases of the First Jewish–Roman War, the Roman governor of Syria (63–65), Cestius Gallus, camped in Gibeon while en route to Jerusalem and again during his retreat.

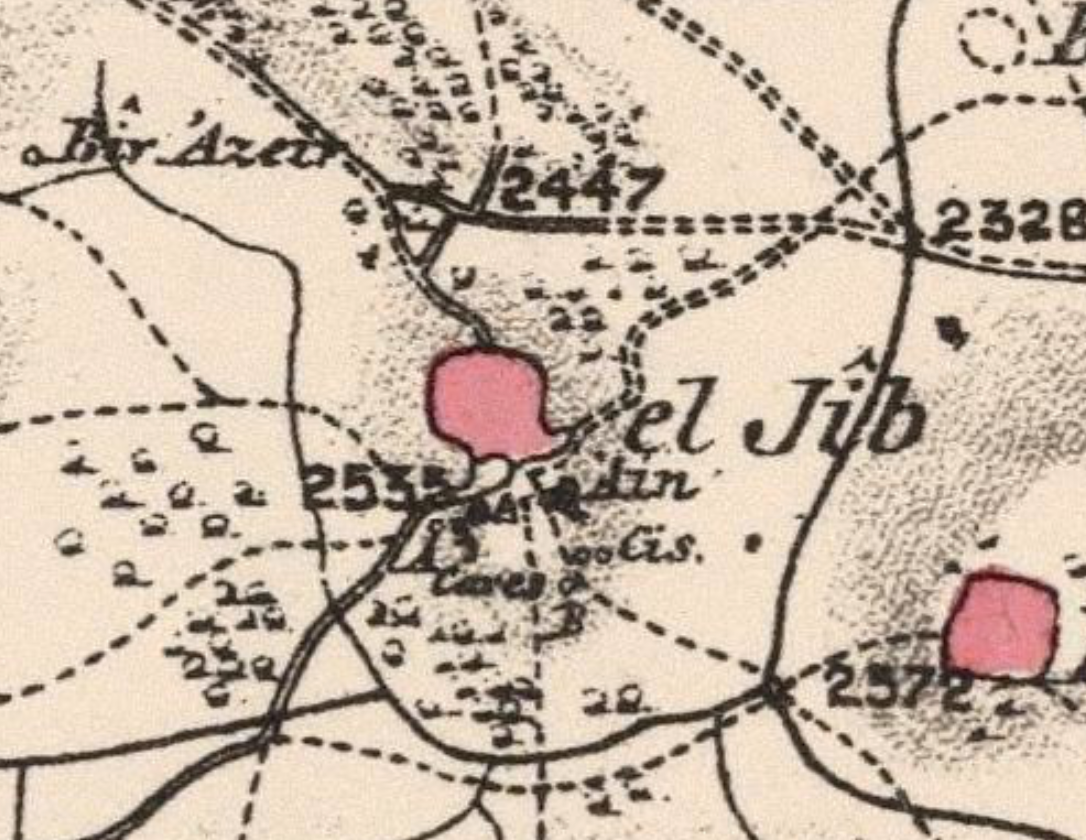
A 1880 map of al Jib showing the well (marked Ain), cisterns (marked Cis), and Caves

Eusebius, in his Onomasticon, mentions Gibeon (Gabaon) as formerly being inhabited by the Gibeonites, who were a Hivite nation, and that their village was located about 4 milestones to the west of Bethel, near Ramah. The 10th-century lexicographer, David ben Abraham al-Fasi identified al-Ǧīb" (now al-Jib) with the ancient city Gibeon, which view was accepted by Frants Buhl and by other historical geographers and described as such in the Hebrew Lexicon compiled by Wilhelm Gesenius, and proved by Hebrew inscriptions unearthed in 1956.

== Sources ==
- Baker, Cynthia M. (2002). Rebuilding the House of Israel: Architectures of Gender in Jewish Antiquity. Stanford University Press. ISBN 978-0-804-74029-6.
- Cohen, Shaye J. D. (2010). The Significance of Yavneh and Other Essays in Jewish Hellenism. Mohr Siebeck. ISBN 978-3-161-50375-7.
- Executive Committee of the Editorial Board; Jacobs, Joseph (1905). "Nethinim". In Singer, Isidore; et al. (eds.). The Jewish Encyclopedia. Vol. 9. New York: Funk & Wagnalls. p. 233.
- Hezser, Catherine (2005). Jewish Slavery in Antiquity. Oxford University Press. ISBN 978-0-199-28086-5.
- Poppers, H. L. (July 1958). "The Declassé in the Babylonian Jewish Community". Jewish Social Studies. 20 (3): 153–179. JSTOR 4465617.
