= Jamil Majdalawi =

Palestinian politician

Jamil Muhammad Ismail al-Majdalawi

Member of the Palestinian Legislative Council
- Incumbent
- Assumed office 18 February 2006

Head of Political Office of the Popular Front for the Liberation of Palestine

Representative of the Popular Front for the Liberation of Palestine on the Palestine Liberation Organization Central Council

Personal details
- Born: 1946 (age 79–80) Simsim
- Party: Popular Front for the Liberation of Palestine

Jamil Muhammad Ismail al-Majdalawi (Arabic: جميل محمد اسماعيل المجدلاوي, born 1946) is a leading member of the Popular Front for the Liberation of Palestine, and a member of the Palestinian Legislative Council.

Born in Simsim, he is one of the PFLP's two representatives on the PLO CC, and the head of their Political Office based in Gaza. He was one of their three deputies elected to the PLC in 2006.
