= Majdal =

Majdal (Arabic: مجدل, meaning "tower") may refer to:

== Israel and Palestine ==
- al-Majdal or al-Majdal Asqalan, a Palestinian village depopulated in 1951, now part of Ashkelon in Israel
- Khirbat al-Majdal, a Palestinian village depopulated in 1948, now in Israel
- al-Majdal, a Palestinian village in Haifa Subdistrict depopulated in 1925, now part of Ramat Yohanan in Israel
- Al-Mujaydil, a Palestinian village depopulated in 1948, now in Israel
- Majd al-Krum, a town in northern Israel
- Majdal Yaba, a Palestinian village depopulated in 1948, now in Israel
- Magdala, ancient Jewish city identified with al-Majdal, near Tiberias
- Majdal Bani Fadil, a modern Palestinian village in the West Bank

== Syria ==
- al-Majdal, Hama, a village in the Hama Governorate of Syria
- Majdal Shams, a village in the Golan Heights, currently under Israeli occupation
- Al-Majdal, Suwayda, a village in Suwayda Governorate of Syria

== Lebanon ==
- Majadel, a village in Lebanon
- Majdal Anjar, a village in Lebanon
