= James B. Pritchard =

American archeologist (1909–1997)

- Born: James Bennett Pritchard; October 4, 1909
- Died: January 1, 1997 (aged 87)

Academic background
- Education: Asbury College; University of Pennsylvania

Academic work
- Discipline: Archaeology
- Sub-discipline: Biblical archaeology; Phoenicians
- Institutions: Crozer Theological Seminary; Church Divinity School of the Pacific; University of Pennsylvania; University of Pennsylvania Museum of Archaeology and Anthropology
- Notable works: Ancient Near Eastern Texts Relating to the Old Testament (1950)

James Bennett Pritchard (October 4, 1909 – January 1, 1997) was an American archeologist whose work explicated the interrelationships of the religions of ancient Palestine, Israel, Canaan, Egypt, Assyria, and Babylon. Pritchard was honored with the Gold Medal Award for Distinguished Archaeological Achievement in 1983 from the Archaeological Institute of America.

He had a long association with the University of Pennsylvania, where he was professor of religious thought and the first curator of Biblical archaeology at the University Museum. Pritchard's strength lay in setting the Bible within its broader cultural contexts in the Ancient Near East. Pritchard was elected to the American Philosophical Society in 1973. In 1977 Pritchard received an honorary doctorate from the Faculty of Theology at Uppsala University, Sweden.

Pritchard authored the book Ancient Near Eastern Texts Relating to the Old Testament, which was released in three editions (1950, 1955, 1969), universally referred to as ANET, which provided reliable translations of texts that threw light on the context of Ancient Near Eastern history and the Hebrew Bible.

== Early life and education ==
Pritchard was born in Louisville, Kentucky; he graduated from Asbury College in 1930, and earned his PhD from the University of Pennsylvania (1942).

== Career ==
Pritchard's archaeological reputation began to be established by his excavations at a site called el-Jib (1956–1962). He identified it as Gibeon by inscriptions on the Al Jib jar handles. He cataloged these in Hebrew Inscriptions and Stamps From Gibeon (1959), which included the first in-depth discussion of concentric-circle incisions on jar handles associated with LMLK seals. He explained the significance of his finds for a general audience in Gibeon: Where the Sun Stood Still (1962).

He followed (1964–1967) with excavations at Tell es-Sa'idiyeh, on the east bank in the Jordan Valley, Jordan, which revealed itself as a meeting place for disparate cultures during the transition in the late Bronze Age to the use of iron, which he connected to the influence of the Sea Peoples ("New evidence on the role of the Sea Peoples in Canaan at the Beginning of the Iron Age"), in The Role of the Phoenicians, 1968. His work was cut short by the 1967 Six-Day War.

His third and last major excavation at Sarafand, Lebanon (1969–1974) revealed the ancient Phoenician city of Sarepta. It was the first time a major Phoenician city situated in the Phoenician heartland had been fully excavated. His first findings were published in 1975: he described pottery workshops and kilns, artifacts of daily use and religious figurines, a shrine, numerous inscriptions that included some in Ugaritic, and a seal with the city's name that made the identification secure. His article, "Sarepta in history and tradition" in Understanding the Sacred Texts (1972) displays his characteristic research. His book Recovering Sarepta, an Ancient Phoenician City (1978) was written for general readers. In 1975 he published with Baruch A. Levine The Israelites, the 18th book in the Time-Life 20 vol. series The Emergence of Man.

Additional works included Archaeology and the Old Testament (1958), which traced the evolution of modern approaches to archaeology from the first excavations in the Holy Land; and Solomon and Sheba (1974), which separated fact from legend.

Prior to his tenured appointment to the University of Pennsylvania, Pritchard taught at Crozer Theological Seminary in Chester, Pennsylvania, 1942–1954, as the chair of Old Testament History and Exegesis. Martin Luther King Jr. wrote an essay about the prophet Jeremiah for his course on the Old Testament. He also taught at the Church Divinity School of the Pacific in Berkeley, California (1954–1962).

An appreciation of James B. Pritchard appeared in the American Journal of Archaeology, Volume 102, Number 1 (January 1998, pages 175–177).
