= Al Jib =

Municipality type D in Jerusalem

- Municipality type D (Village council)

Arabic transcription(s)
  - Arabic: الجيب
  - Latin: al-Jib (official) al-Jeeb, el-Jib, el-Jeeb (unofficial)
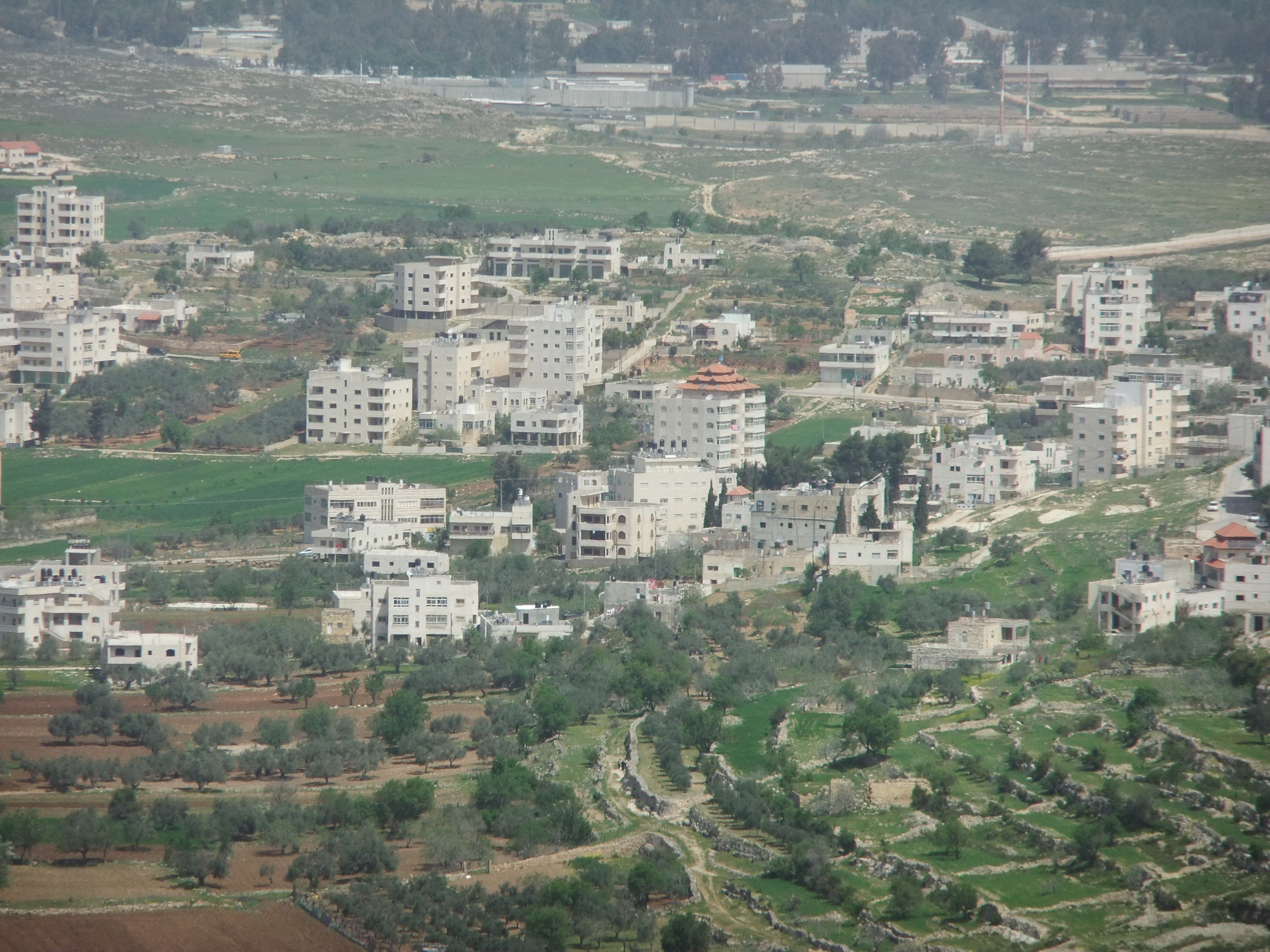
- View of Al Jib's center, 2012

- Location of Al Jib within Palestine Al Jib (State of Palestine)
- Coordinates: 31°51′5″N 35°11′4″E
- Palestine grid: 167/139
- State: State of Palestine
- Governorate: Quds

Government
  - Type: Village council

Area
  - Total: 9.9 km^{2} (3.8 sq mi)
- Elevation: 739 m (2,425 ft)

Population (2017)
  - Total: 3,862
  - Density: 390/km^{2} (1,000/sq mi)
- Name meaning: Al Jib, personal name

Al Jib or al-Jib (Arabic: الجيب) is a Palestinian village in the Jerusalem Governorate of the State of Palestine, located ten kilometers northwest of Jerusalem, partially in the seam zone of the West Bank. The surrounding lands are home to Al Jib Bedouin. Since 1967, Al Jib has been occupied by Israel and about 90% of its lands are classified as Area C. About a quarter of the land is seized by Military Orders for the establishment of Israeli settlements. Al Jib's Al Khalayleh neighborhood was separated from the rest of the city by the West Bank barrier. According to the Palestinian Central Bureau of Statistics, Al Jib had a population of approximately 4,700 in 2006 and 3,862 by 2017.

== Location ==
Al Jib is a Palestinian village located 9.5 kilometers (5.9 mi) (horizontally) north-west of Jerusalem. It is bordered by Bir Nabala and Al Judeira to the east, Beituniya to the north, Beit Ijza and Biddu to the west, and An Nabi Samwil to the south.

== History ==
=== Ancient period ===
Al-Jib is identified with the ancient Canannite and Israelite city of Gibeon (from Biblical Hebrew: gēb "pit, ditch, trench"). The first scientific identification of Al-Jib with the ancient Gibeon was made by Edward Robinson in 1838. Archaeological excavations led by James Pritchard in 1956, 1957, and 1959 confirmed this identification with the discovery of the "Al Jib jar handles", 56 jar handles inscribed with the Semitic name gb'n. The inscriptions were dated to the latter years of the Kingdom of Judah and have been cross-referenced against genealogical lists in the Book of Chronicles. While they include many Benjaminite names, they also include non-Israelite names, attesting to the intermixing of local population.

Gibeon prospered during the late Iron Age II, when the town had strong fortifications, a winery and a sophisticated water system. An intricate cemetery from the same period was discovered just east of the tell.

Pottery and coins from the Late Hellenistic and Hasmonean periods dating to the reigns of Antiochus III and John Hyrcanus were discovered at the site.

=== Late antiquity ===
A vaulted building still remaining in the centre of Al Jib has been dated from between the mid-5th and mid-8th centuries CE. The building has earlier been described as a church from the Crusader era, with "total length of the chapel appears to have been 40 feet east and west, 22 feet north and south. The apses have been apparently built up. There were three bays of arches, and in the side walls are small doors with lintels". D. Pringle dismissed the possibility that this was a former church, and suggest instead that it was an Umayyad palace building, or possibly dating from the Abbasid era.

=== Middle Ages ===
In 1152, during the Crusader era, a confrere of the Church of the Holy Sepulchre, Baldwin of Tournai, was granted a prebend relating to juxta Gabeon.

In 1187, after the fall of Jerusalem, the Ayyubid sultan Saladin halted at al-Jib, before continuing to Beit Nuba. The village was described by the geographer Yaqut al-Hamawi in 1225 as having two fortresses standing close together.

=== Ottoman era ===
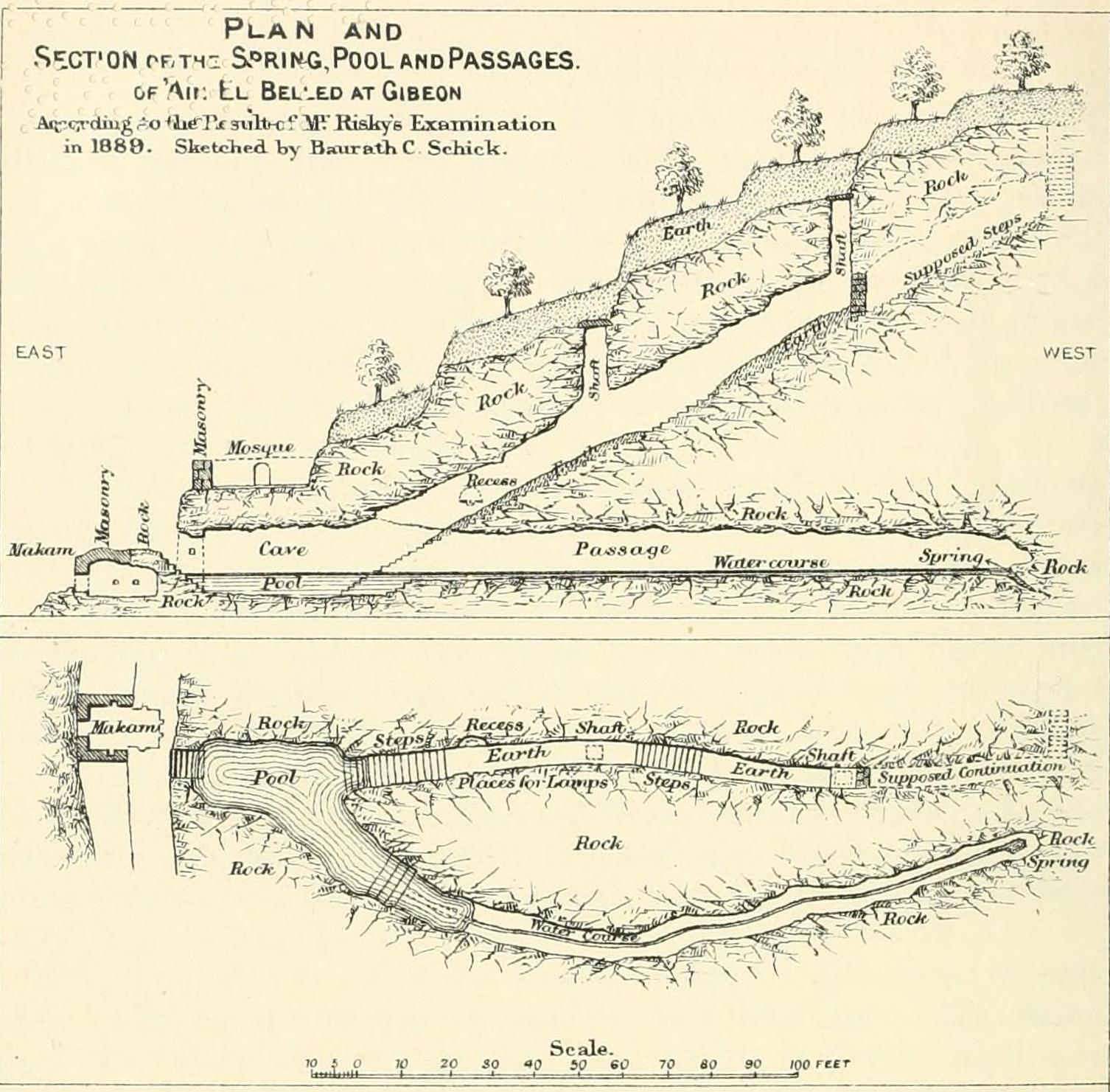
Conrad Schick's diagram of the Al Jib tunnels, 1890

By the 1550s the agricultural revenues of Al Jib belonged to the endowment (waqf) of Mamluk Sultan Inal (r. 1453–61) in Egypt. However, three tribes of the Hutaym Bedouin were affiliated with the village. The taxes they paid plus levies normally earmarked for the military were in the 1550s designated for the waqf of Hasseki Sultan Imaret in Jerusalem. In the 1596 tax-records it appeared as Jib, located in the Nahiya of Jabal Quds of the Liwa of Al-Quds. The population was 103 households, large enough to be divided into four quarters. The villagers paid a fixed tax-rate of 33,3% on agricultural products, including wheat, barley, olive trees, fruit trees, grape syrup or molasse, in addition to occasional revenues, goats and beehives; a total of 16,060 Akçe.

In 1838 Edward Robinson described it as a village of moderate size, with the houses standing very irregularly and unevenly. He further noted "One large massive building still remains, perhaps a castle or tower of strength. The lower rooms a vaulted with round arches of hewn stones fitted together with great exactness. The stones outside are large; and the whole appearance is that of antiquity." El-Jib was further noted as a Muslim village, part of the El-Kuds district.

In 1863 Victor Guérin found that Al Jib had 500 inhabitants, while an Ottoman village list from about 1870 found that the village had a population of 219, in a total of 65 houses, though that population count included men, only.

In 1883, the PEF's Survey of Western Palestine (SWP) described it as "on the end of a hill, rising 300 feet above the valley. On the south is a narrow plain, and there is an open valley on the east, whilst to the north and west there is also a flat plain. The hill is thus isolated, and a position naturally of great strength. The houses cover the northern part of the hill. The village is of moderate size, the houses of stone, with a central tower, and massive foundations exist among the modern buildings. On the east, rather lower than the village and a little below the top of the ridge, is the spring, which issues from a cave. Below it are remains of a good-sized reservoir. There are many springs on the south and west, and caves in the southern side of the hill. Olives, figs, pears, apples, and vines are cultivated round the village and in the plain; there are also extensive corn-fields in the low ground."

In 1896 the population of Ed-dschib was estimated to be about 567 persons.

=== British Mandate era ===
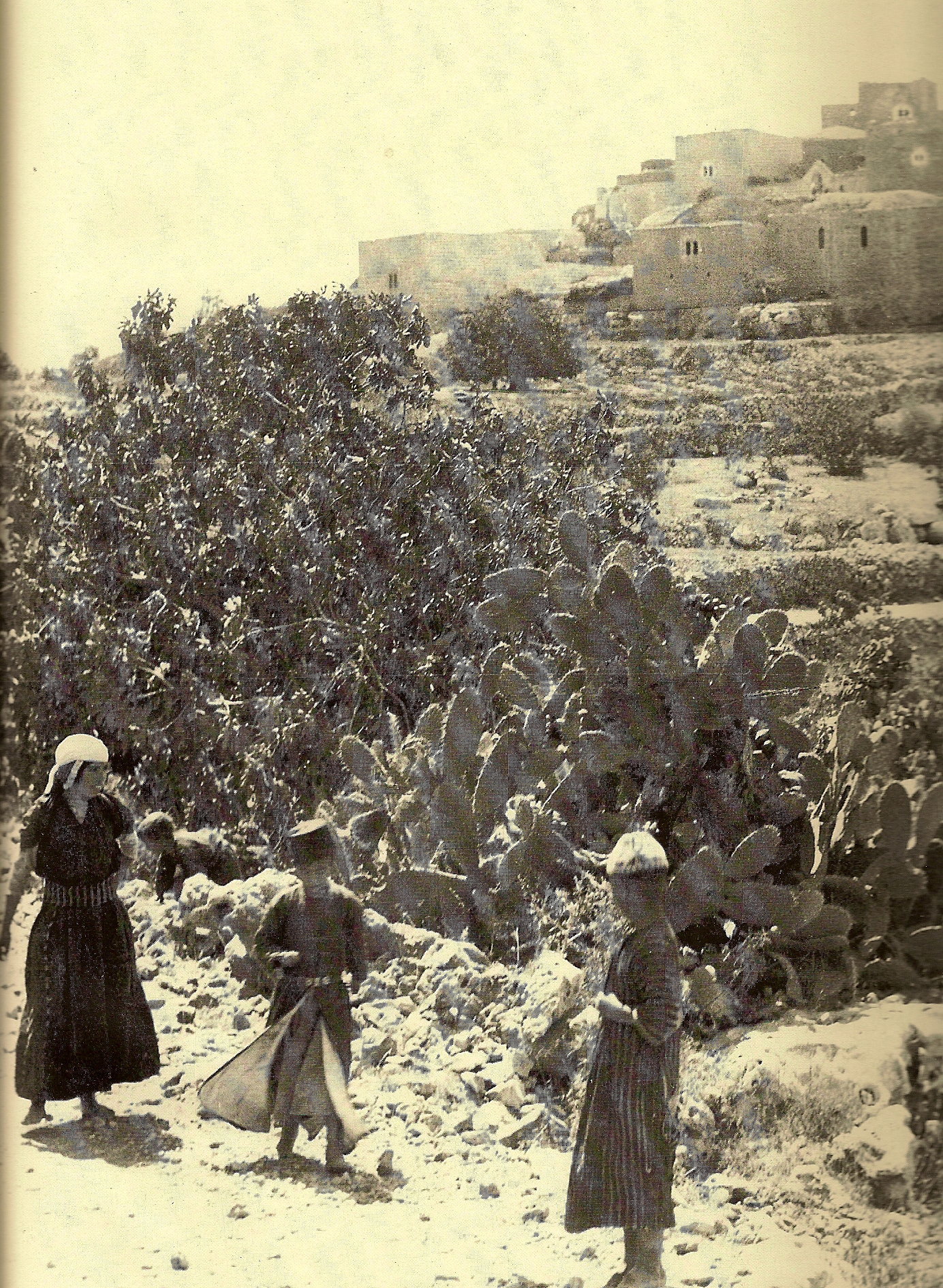
Al Jib, 1938-39

In the 1922 census of Palestine conducted by the British Mandate authorities, Jib had a population 465, all Muslims, increasing in the 1931 census to 643, still all Muslim, in 153 houses.

In the early 1930s, Grace Mary Crowfoot noted how the women of Al Jib and Kafr al-Labad made pottery (without a wheel), looking much like ware made in the 8th and 7th BCE.

In the 1945 statistics, Al Jib had a population of 830 Muslims, and a total land area of 8,205 dunams. 1,132 dunams were designated for plantations and irrigable land, 4,754 for cereals, while 57 dunams were built-up area.

=== Jordanian era ===
in the wake of the 1948 Arab-Israeli War, and after the 1949 Armistice Agreements, Al Jib came under Jordanian rule.

In 1961, the population of Jib was 1,123.

=== Post 1967 ===
Since the 1967 Six-Day War, al-Jib has been under Israeli occupation. The population in the 1967 census conducted by the Israeli authorities was 1,173, 27 of whom originated from Israeli territory.

Since 1967, Israel has confiscated 26.6% of Al Jib's lands to establish large urban Israeli settlements Givon (1978), Giv'on HaHadashah (1980) and Giv'at Ze'ev (1982).

Under the 1995 Oslo II Accord, 7.5% of the total village area was classified as Area B, and the remaining 92.5% became Area C, under full Israeli control.

== Separation wall ==
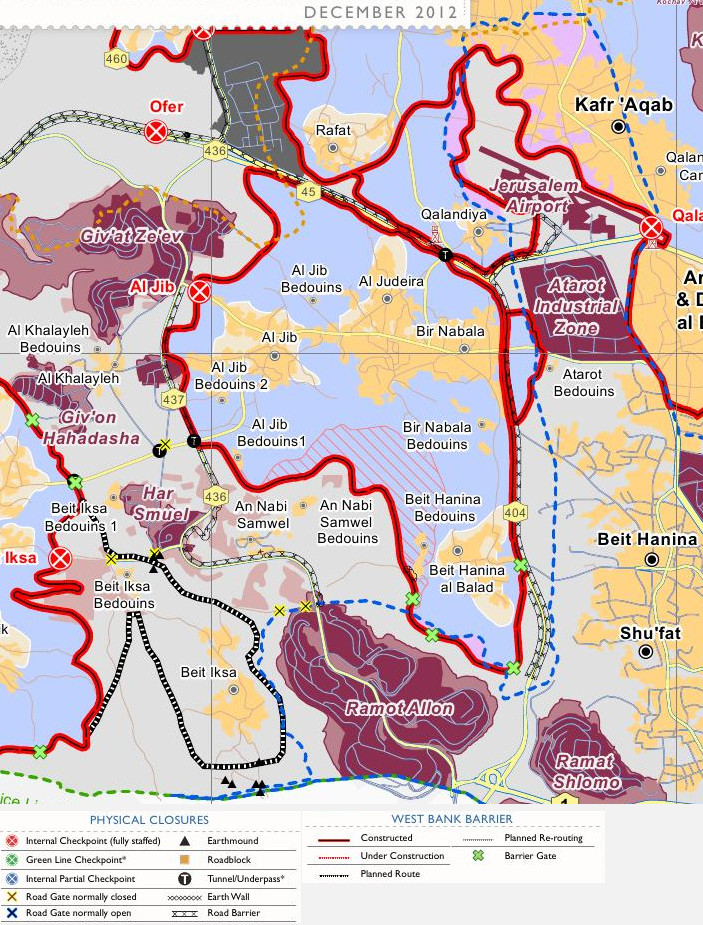
The barrier in northern Jerusalem, which confines Al Jib to an enclave under Israeli control.

In 2005, Israel started the construction of a separation barrier around Al Jib, al-Judeira, Bir Nabala, Beit Hanina al-Balad and Kalandiya. The wall was built on Palestinian land seized by Military Orders. The wall completely surrounds the villages, forming an enclave. One effect is that it prevents the Palestinian residents without Israeli citizenship or permanent residency cards from using the nearby road-system serving Jerusalem and nearby Israeli settlements.

The wall has also divided the village of Al Jib. Part of their farm-land lies on the other side of the wall and only a limited number of residents have limited access. A complete neighborhood, Al Khalayleh, with an estimated population of 700 citizens, is now located west of the Wall in a separate enclave between Israeli settlements. In April 2012, Israel demolished a number of houses in Al Khalayleh and displaced 67 Palestinian refugees from the neighborhood, most of whom were children. About half of Al Jib's total area, including Al Khalayleh, is located on the other side of the barrier.

Israel claims that it intends to build two alternate roads that will link the enclave to the rest of the West Bank to prevent its complete isolation. One will connect the enclave with Ramallah, which lies to its north, while the other will connect Al Jib to the Bedouin area, which lies to its west, by means of three underground passageways and two bridges. The road's construction will require complex engineering work and will cost tens of millions of shekels, so it is likely that the project will take a long time, if ever, to complete

B'Tselem points out that because thousands of the enclave's residents hold Israeli identity cards, they are entitled to free access to East Jerusalem by law, and that the barrier thus "will severely impair [their] human rights" by cutting off direct access.

== Preservation ==
Al Jib is on the list of "Endangered Cultural Heritage Sites in the West Bank Governorates" compiled by the Ministry of Planning and International Cooperation (MOCIP) of the Palestinian National Authority (PNA) due to the excavations of ancient Gibeon. During the second Intifada, the Palestinian Association for Cultural Exchange (PACE) brought together Palestinian youth and elders from the surrounding villages to repair and restore the ancient water pool and other sites around the village.

== Bibliography ==
- Barron, J.B., ed. (1923). Palestine: Report and General Abstracts of the Census of 1922. Government of Palestine.
- Behâ ed-Dîn (1897). C. R. Conder (ed.). The Life of Saladin. London: Committee of the Palestine Exploration Fund.
- Brooks, Simcha Shalom (2005). Saul and the Monarchy: A New Look. Ashgate Publishing, Ltd. ISBN 9780754652045.
- Conder, C.R.; Kitchener, H.H. (1883). The Survey of Western Palestine: Memoirs of the Topography, Orography, Hydrography, and Archaeology. Vol. 3. London: Committee of the Palestine Exploration Fund. (pp. 94, 95, 96, 99 164)
- Crowfoot, G.M. (1932). "Pots, ancient and modern". Palestine Exploration Fund Quarterly Statement: 179–187.
- Dauphin, C. (1998). La Palestine byzantine, Peuplement et Populations. BAR International Series 726 (in French). Vol. III : Catalogue. Oxford: Archeopress. ISBN 0-860549-05-4.
- Government of Jordan, Department of Statistics (1964). First Census of Population and Housing. Volume I: Final Tables; General Characteristics of the Population (PDF).
- Government of Palestine, Department of Statistics (1945). Village Statistics, April, 1945.
- Guérin, V. (1868). Description géographique historique et archéologique de la Palestine (in French). Vol. 1: Judée, pt. 1. Paris: Imprimerie nationale.
- Hadawi, S. (1970). Village Statistics of 1945: A Classification of Land and Area ownership in Palestine. Palestine Liberation Organization Research Center. Archived from the original on 2018-12-08.
- Hartmann, M. (1883). "Die Ortschaftenliste des Liwa Jerusalem in dem türkischen Staatskalender für Syrien auf das Jahr 1288 der Flucht (1871)". Zeitschrift des Deutschen Palästina-Vereins. 6: 102–149.
- Hütteroth, W.-D.; Abdulfattah, K. (1977). Historical Geography of Palestine, Transjordan and Southern Syria in the Late 16th Century. Erlanger Geographische Arbeiten, Sonderband 5. Erlangen, Germany: Vorstand der Fränkischen Geographischen Gesellschaft. ISBN 3-920405-41-2.
- Le Strange, G. (1890). Palestine Under the Moslems: A Description of Syria and the Holy Land from A.D. 650 to 1500. Committee of the Palestine Exploration Fund.
- Mills, E., ed. (1932). Census of Palestine 1931. Population of Villages, Towns and Administrative Areas. Jerusalem: Government of Palestine.
- Palmer, E.H. (1881). The Survey of Western Palestine: Arabic and English Name Lists Collected During the Survey by Lieutenants Conder and Kitchener, R. E. Transliterated and Explained by E.H. Palmer. Committee of the Palestine Exploration Fund.
- Pringle, D. (1983). "Two Medieval Villages North of Jerusalem: Archaeological Investigations in Al-Jib and Ar-Ram". Levant. 15: 141–177, pls.xvi-xxiia. doi:10.1179/lev.1983.15.1.141.
- Pringle, D. (1993). The Churches of the Crusader Kingdom of Jerusalem: A-K (excluding Acre and Jerusalem). Vol. I. Cambridge University Press. ISBN 0-521-39036-2.
- Robinson, E.; Smith, E. (1841). Biblical Researches in Palestine, Mount Sinai and Arabia Petraea: A Journal of Travels in the year 1838. Vol. 2. Boston: Crocker & Brewster.
- Robinson, E.; Smith, E. (1841). Biblical Researches in Palestine, Mount Sinai and Arabia Petraea: A Journal of Travels in the year 1838. Vol. 3. Boston: Crocker & Brewster.
- Röhricht, R. (1893). (RRH) Regesta regni Hierosolymitani (MXCVII-MCCXCI) (in Latin). Berlin: Libraria Academica Wageriana.
- de Roziére, ed. (1849). Cartulaire de l'église du Saint Sépulchre de Jérusalem: publié d'après les manuscrits du Vatican (in Latin and French). Paris: Imprimerie nationale.
- Schick, C. (1896). "Zur Einwohnerzahl des Bezirks Jerusalem". Zeitschrift des Deutschen Palästina-Vereins. 19: 120–127.
- Singer, A. (2002). Constructing Ottoman Beneficence: An Imperial Soup Kitchen in Jerusalem. Albany: State University of New York Press. ISBN 0-7914-5352-9.
- Socin, A. (1879). "Alphabetisches Verzeichniss von Ortschaften des Paschalik Jerusalem". Zeitschrift des Deutschen Palästina-Vereins. 2: 135–163.
- Toledano, E. (1984). "The Sanjaq of Jerusalem in the Sixteenth Century: Aspects of Topography and Population". Archivum Ottomanicum. 9: 279–319. Archived from the original on 2016-03-05.
