= Ahmad Abdel Rahman =

Palestinian politician (1943–2019)

Personal details
- Born: 12 November 1943 Bayt Shanna, Ramla, Mandatory Palestine
- Died: 2 December 2019 (aged 76) Ramallah, West Bank
- Resting place: Ramallah
- Party: Fatah
- Education: Damascus School of Law; American University of Beirut

Ahmad Abdel Rahman (1943–2019) was a senior member of the Palestine Liberation Organization (PLO) and served in different capacities under both Yasser Arafat and Mahmoud Abbas from 1967 to 2000s.

== Early life and education ==
Abdel Rahman was born in Bayt Shanna, Ramla, Mandatory Palestine, on 12 November 1943. He obtained a degree in law from Damascus School of Law in 1969. He joined the PLO in 1967 and became the first Fatah representative in the Palestinian Student Union in Syria. He received his MA in political science from the American University of Beirut in 1982.

== Career ==
Abdel Rahman joined the Voice of Al Asifa or Voice of the Storm in Cairo, Egypt, in 1968. The same year he was named as the Fatah representative in Sudan. He was part of the Fatah missions in Latin America from 1969 to 1971. He was the director of Voice of Al Asifa Syria between 1970 and its closure by the Syrian government in October 1973. Immediately following this incident he was arrested and detained by the Syrians and was released from Al Maza Prison in Damascus after a few weeks.

Abdel Rahman was appointed chairman of the Palestinian Liberation Council in 1973 which he held until 1994. He began to edit Falastin Al Thawra, a Fatah publication, in 1973 and served as its editor-in-chief until 1994 when it folded. He was elected as the secretary general of the Palestinian Union of Writers and Journalists in 1974, and his tenure ended in 2005.

Abdel Rahman was named as the head of the Palestinian Cinema and Photography Organization in 1981 when the head of the organization, Majed Abu Sharar, was assassinated. Abdel Rahman served as the official spokesman for the PLO between 1982 and 1994. He was a member of the Palestinian National Council and the Palestinian Central Council. He was appointed secretary general of the Palestinian Council of Ministers in 1996 which he held until 2003. During the same period he was also the spokesman for the Palestinian National Authority (PNA).

Abdel Rahman was the political adviser to Yasser Arafat during the siege of the PLO's administrative center in West Bank during the Second Intifada. He was one of the PLO officials who accompanied Arafat during his illness.

Abdel Rahman's role as the PNA spokesman continued after the death of Arafat in 2004. In addition, he was one of the advisers to the Palestinian President Mahmoud Abbas.

=== Views ===
Abdel Rahman was part of the pro-Soviet faction within the PLO in the 1970s. Later he adopted a moderate political stance. He was one of the PLO officials who claimed that Arafat was poisoned a year before his death on 11 November 2004.

== Death ==
Abdel Rahman died in Ramallah on 2 December 2019. Mahmoud Abbas attended his funeral ceremony held in Ramallah on 4 December.

== See also ==
- List of Fatah members
