= Elias Sanbar =

Palestinian historian, poet and diplomat (born 1947)

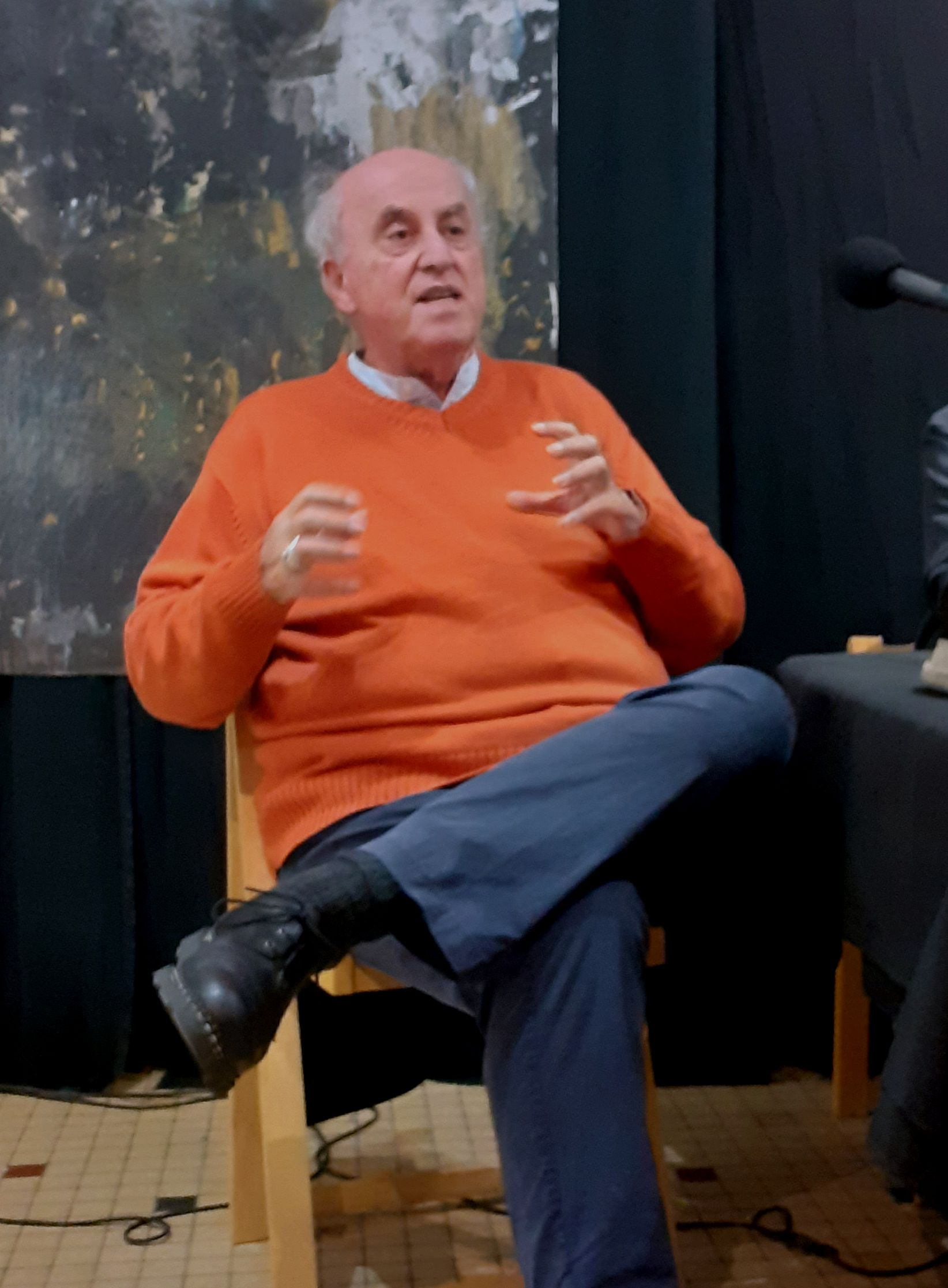
- Born: Elias Wadih Sanbar; 1947 (age 78–79); Haifa, Mandatory Palestine
- Occupations: Historian, poet, essayist, translator, diplomat

Elias Wadih Sanbar (Arabic: إلياس صنبر) (born 1947) is a Palestinian historian, poet, essayist, translator and diplomat. Since 2012, he has been the Palestinian ambassador to UNESCO.

During the late 1960s, Sanbar was a member of the French branch of the General Union of Palestinian Students, which was established by Mahmoud Hamshari in Paris, France. Through the union, Hamshari organized the visit of the Swiss film director Jean-Luc Godard to Jordan and Lebanon, where he met with the Palestinian fighters in 1969. Sanbar accompanied Godard during the visit.

Sanbar co-founded Revue d'études palestiniennes [The Journal of Palestine Studies] in 1981, and was the journal's editor-in-chief for 25 years.

He has translated the poetry of Mahmoud Darwish into French.

Sanbar's book The Palestinians was the 2015 winner of the Palestine Book Awards.

== Select works ==
- Palestine 1948, l’expulsion (1984)
- Les Palestiniens dans le siècle (1994)
- Palestine, le pays à venir (1996)
- Le Lit de l’étrangère (2000) (translated from Mahmoud Darwish)
- Le bien des absents (2001)
- Palestiniens: la photographie d’une terre et de son peuple de 1839 à nos jours (2004)
- La Dernière Guerre? Palestine, 7 octobre 2023 – 2 avril 2024 (2024)
