= Falastin Al Thawra =

Palestinian political magazine (1972–1994)

- Editor: Kamal Nasser; Ahmad Abdel Rahman
- Categories: Political magazine
- Frequency: Weekly
- Publisher: PLO Information Center
- Founded: 1972
- First issue: 28 June 1972
- Final issue: 17 July 1994
- Based in: Beirut; Nicosia
- Language: Arabic

Falastin Al Thawra (Arabic: فلسطين الثورة, romanized: Filastin Al–Thawra, lit. 'Palestine of the Revolution') was an official weekly periodical of the Palestine Liberation Organization (PLO) which was published between 1972 and 1994 first in Beirut, Lebanon, and then in Nicosia, Cyprus. It was the major media outlet of the PLO.

== History and profile ==
Falastin Al Thawra was established in 1972, and its first issue appeared on 28 June that year. The magazine succeeded another PLO publication entitled Fatah which appeared between 1970 and 1972. Falastin Al Thawra was started when a Unified Information Unit was formed by the PLO to have a consolidated communication and media strategy. The magazine came out weekly and was based in Beirut. Its founding editor-in-chief was Kamal Nasser who held the post until 10 April 1973 when he was assassinated by the Israeli agents. Ahmad Abdel Rahman replaced him in the post and was its editor-in-chief until 1994 when the magazine folded. The publisher of Falastin Al Thawra was the PLO Information Center.

Yasser Arafat read each editorial to be published in Falastin Al Thawra. He had a regular column in the magazine entitled The Leader of the Revolution. Mahmoud Abbas also published articles in the magazine. Falastin Al Thawra featured interviews one of which was with Salah Khalaf in June 1984. The Palestinian poet Ezzedine Al Manasara served as the editor of the culture section of the weekly. One of the sections of the magazine, The Refugees Write, featured statements or poems by the Palestinian refugees from different countries.

Yusuf Al Haytham, a member of the Popular Front for the Liberation of Palestine, argued in 1976 that Falastin Al Thawra was close to the Fatah group. The magazine was distributed in the Arab countries. Falastin Al Thawra was also clandestinely distributed in Palestine where the Israeli authorities arrested those who read, carried or owned it. Some of the articles published in the magazine were translated into German and featured in the leftist publications supporting the Palestinians in the mid 1970s.

Its headquarters moved to Nicosia immediately after the PLO left Beirut in 1982. The last issue of Falastin Al Thawra appeared on 17 July 1994. It was succeeded by Al Hayat Al Jadida which was first published in Gaza City in November 1994.

The issues of Falastin Al Thawra are archived by the Palestinian Resource Center.
