= Umm Khalid =

Umm Khalid أم خالد Mukhalid, Castellare Rogerii Longobardi
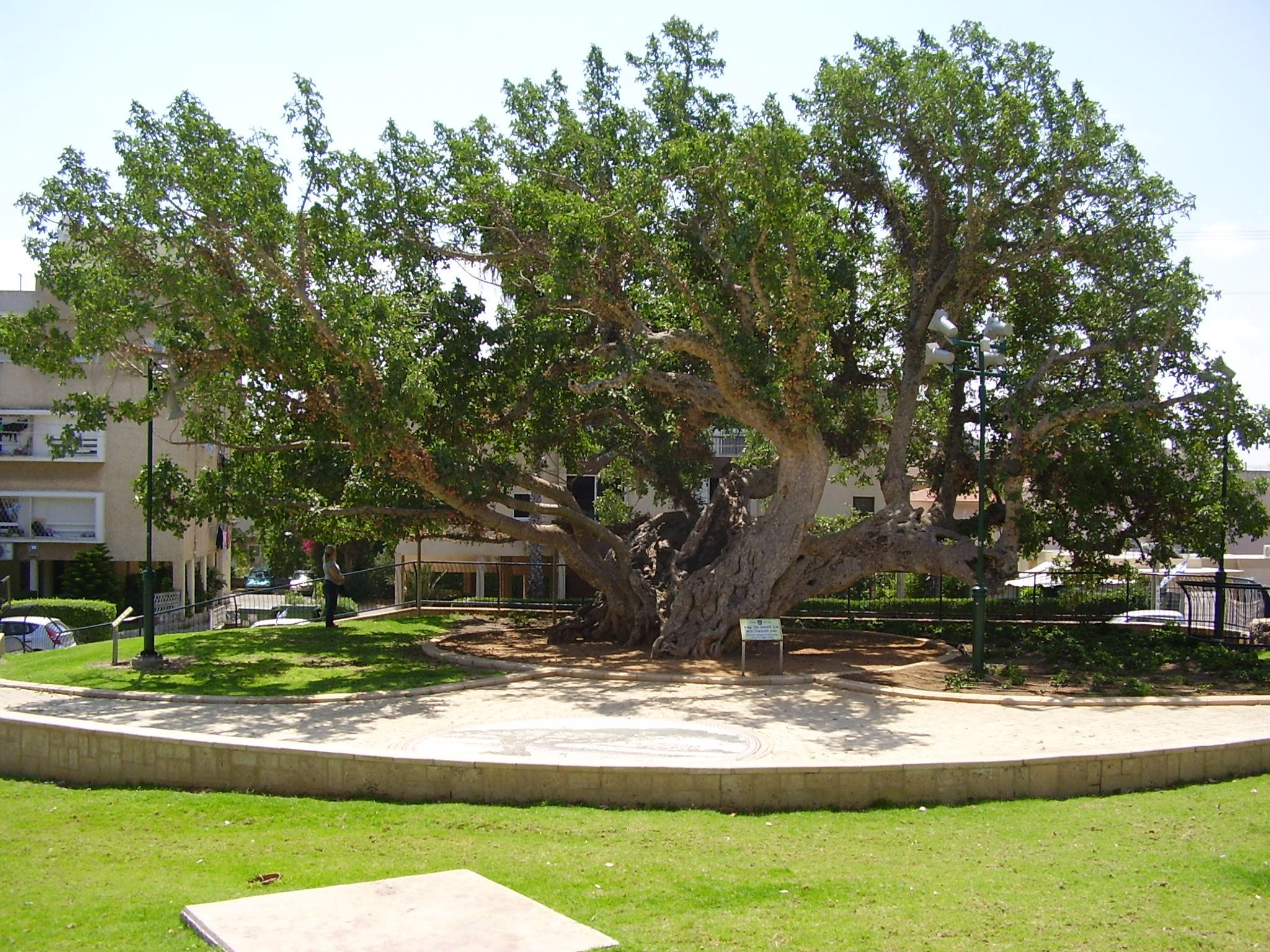
- Ancient sycamore tree, Umm Khalid

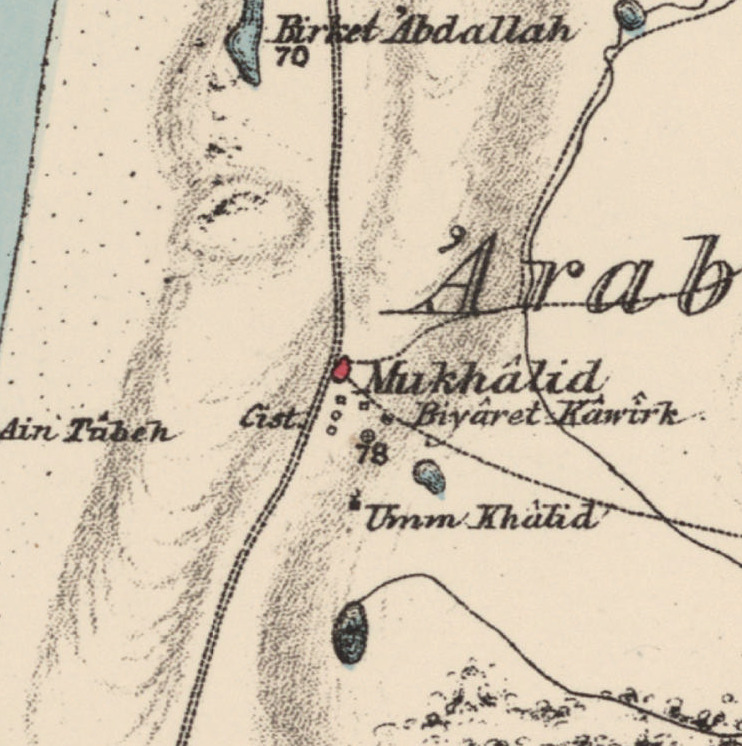
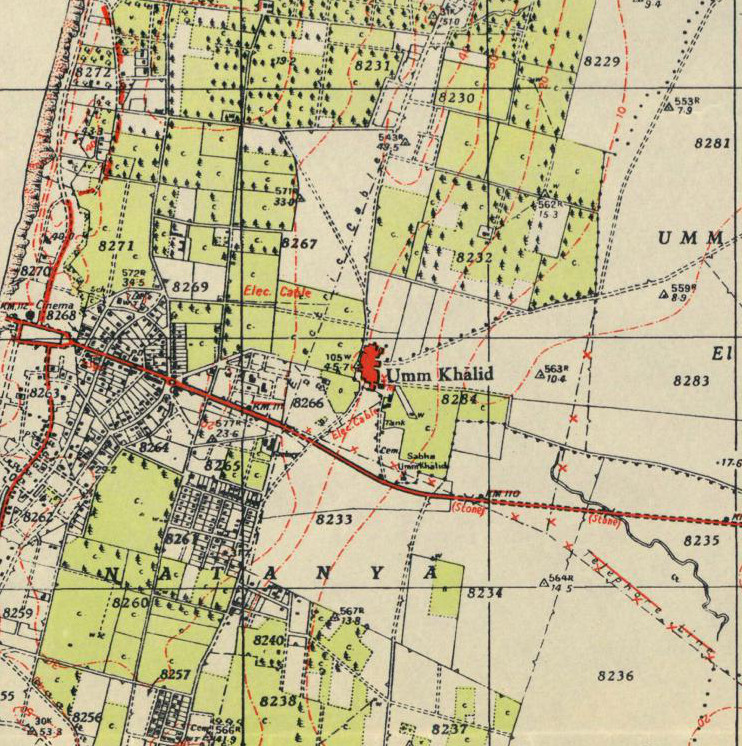
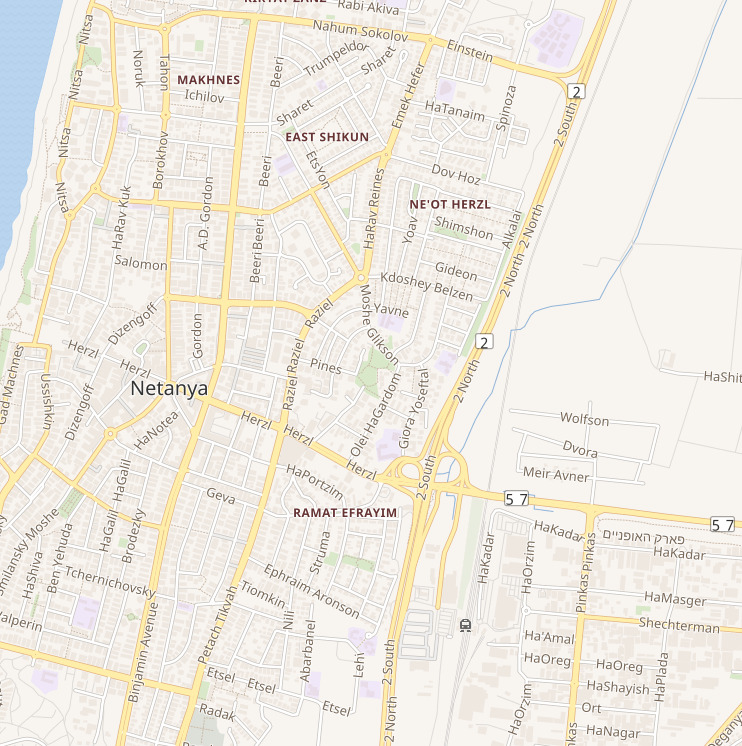
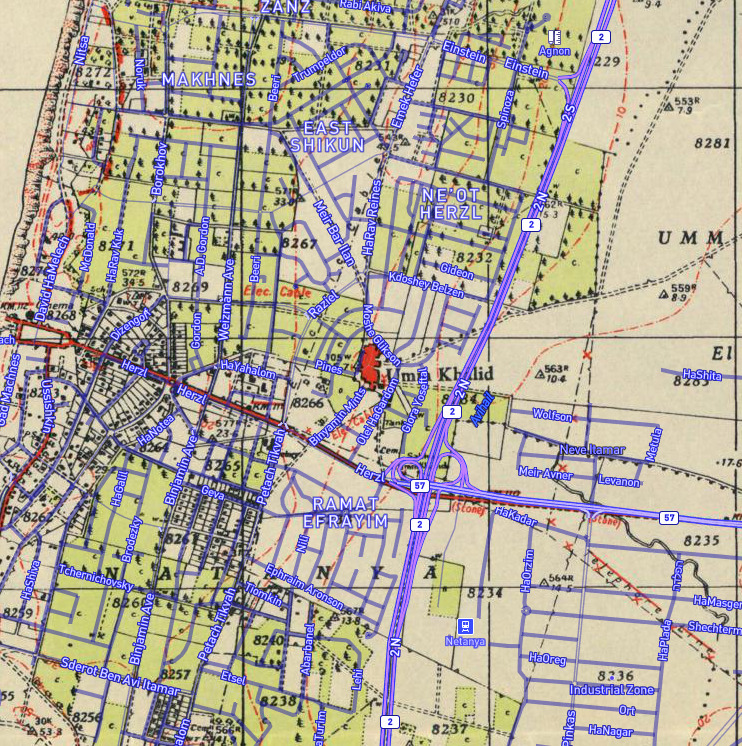
- 1870s map 1940s map modern map 1940s with modern overlay map A series of historical maps of the area around Umm Khalid (click the buttons)

- Location within Mandatory Palestine
- Coordinates: 32°19′45″N 34°51′55″E
- Palestine grid: 137/192
- Geopolitical entity: Mandatory Palestine
- Subdistrict: Tulkarm
- Date of depopulation: 20 March 1948

Area
  - Total: 2,894 dunams (2.894 km^{2}; 1.117 sq mi)

Population (1945)
  - Total: 970
- Cause(s) of depopulation: Military blockade of goods and people into village
- Current Localities: Netanya

Umm Khalid (Arabic: أم خالد), also called Mukhalid, was a Palestinian village in the Tulkarm Subdistrict, 15 kilometers (9.3 mi) west of Tulkarm. It was an ancient site in the central coastline of what is now the city of Netanya, Israel.

== History ==
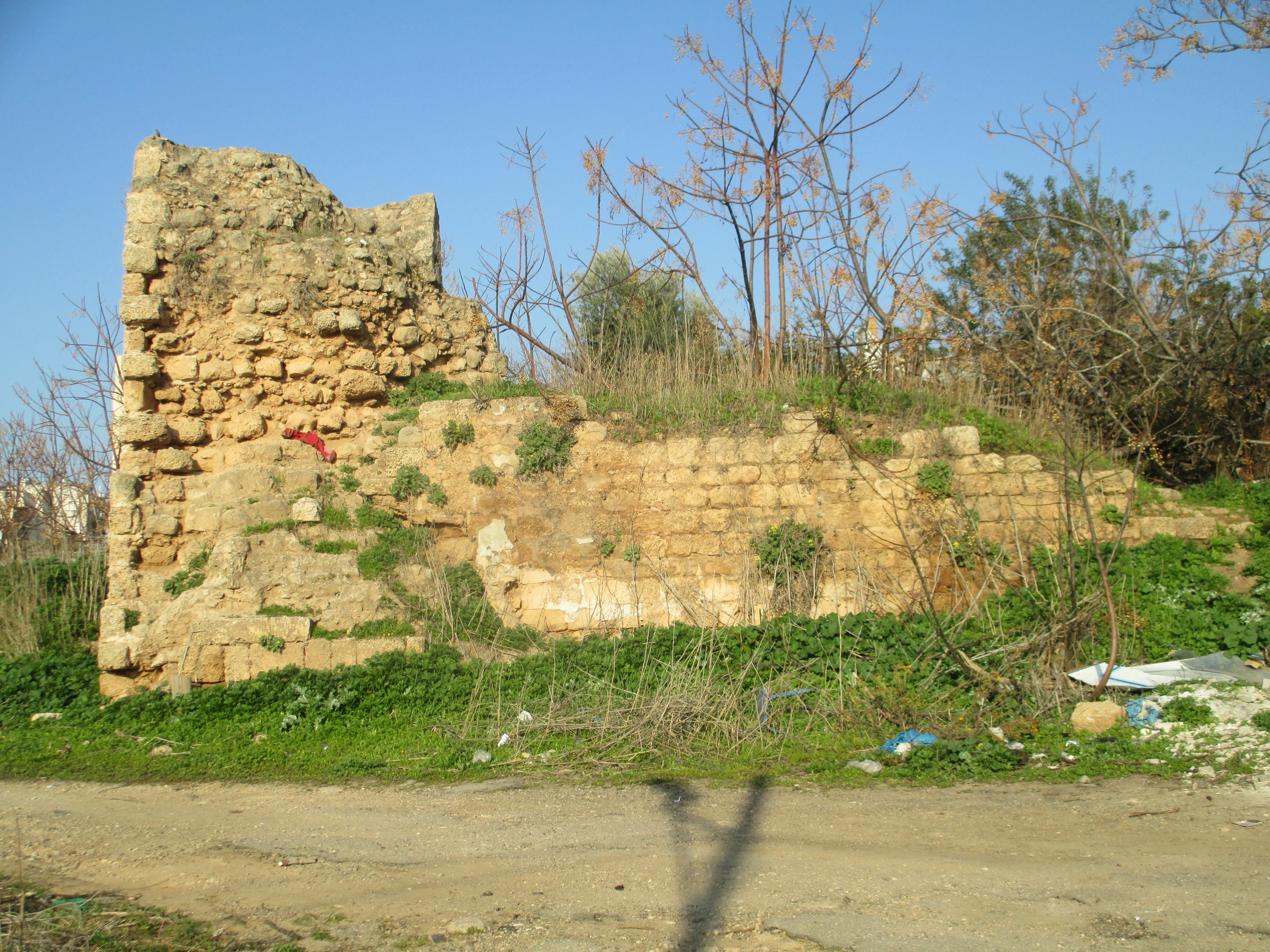
Remains of the Crusader castle in Umm Khalid

Archaeological findings around the village included the remains of towers, fortresses, wells, reservoirs, cisterns, and pottery.

Flint tools found around the area suggest that the site might have been inhabited since prehistoric times.

First century BCE remnants of buildings, installations and burial caves have been found.

=== Crusader castle ===
The village site contained Castellum Rogerii Langobardi, the castle of Roger the Lombard, built by the Crusaders. The building was mentioned in 1135, mostly destroyed c. 1948, and partly excavated in 1985/86. It appears to have been continuously in use from the Crusader period until 1948.

=== Ottoman period ===
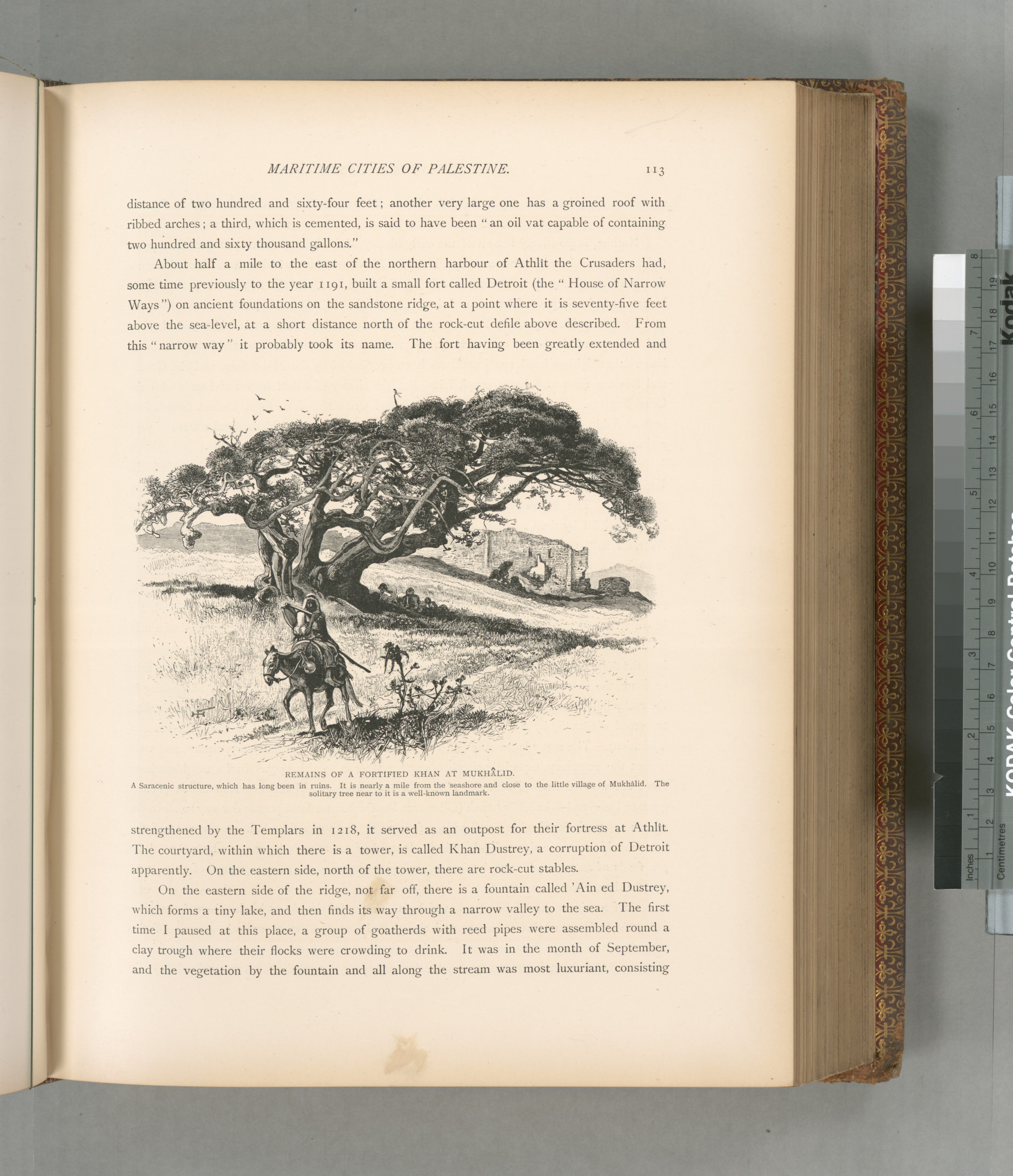
An ancient sycamore tree (Ficus sycomorus), estimated at between 600 and 1,200 years old, was described by Colonel by Charles Wilson as a "well-known landmark" growing "close to the...village" in his illustrated book Picturesque Palestine, Sinai, and Egypt (1883, vol. II, p. 113)

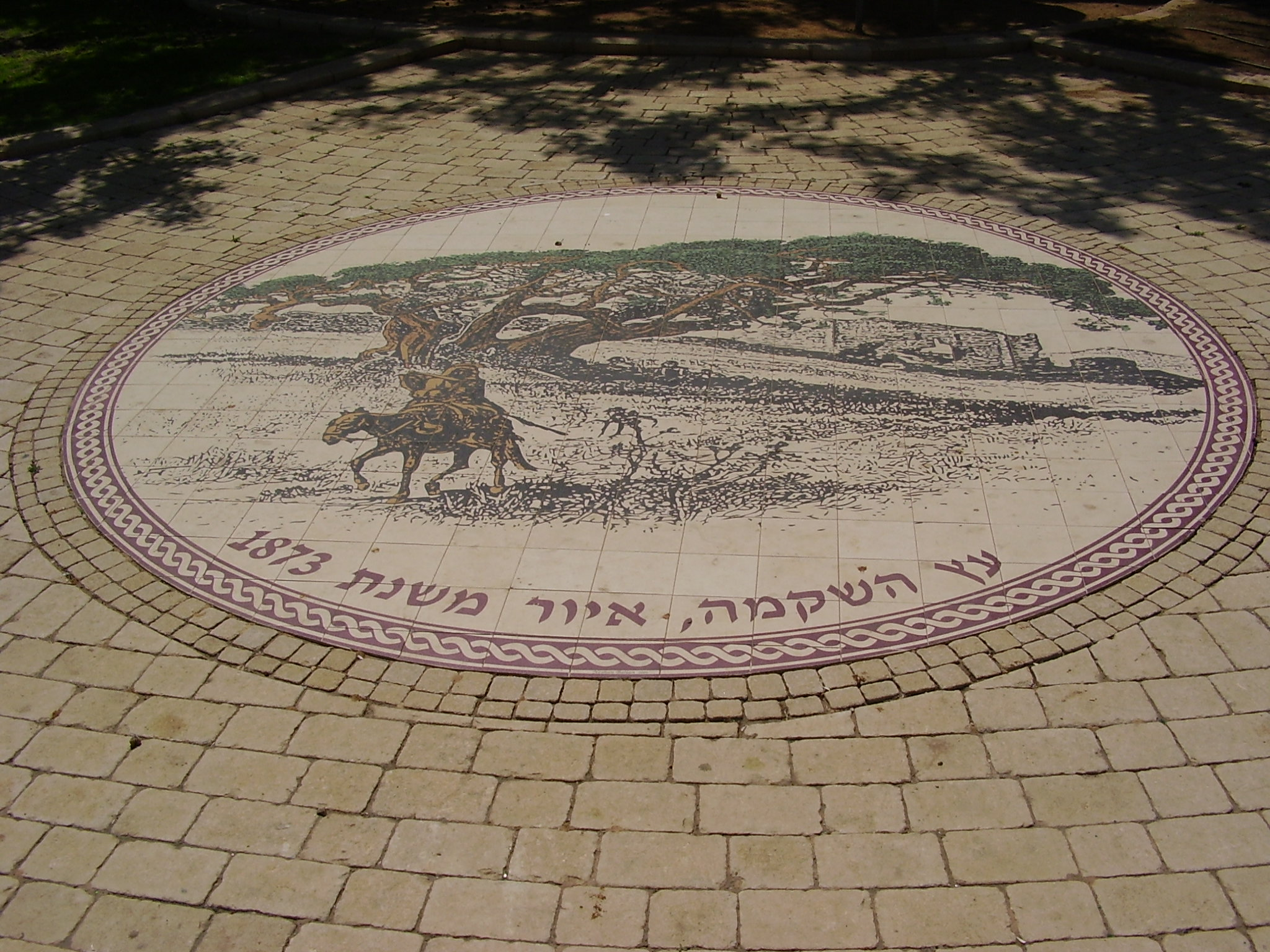
Wilson's illustration is reproduced on ceramic floor tiles near the tree, now on Mintz Street in Netanya.

Umm Khalid was one of four villages founded in the 18th century, near the coast north of the Yarkon River (along with the villages of Al-Shaykh Muwannis, Al-Haram, and Ijlil).The village was established as a road station along the coastal route between fast-growing Jaffa and Acre. According to historian Roy Marom, the establishment of Umm Khalid "demonstrates that the expansion of settlement in the southern Sharon was the result of the internal expansion of the core settlement by residents of the mountainous highlands of Samaria, and not by Egyptian ‘penetrators’ as previously claimed."

The village was named Omm Kaled on a 1799 map of the area, and the village was razed by the troops of Napoleon during their return to Egypt after their failed siege of Acre in 1799.

The British traveller James Silk Buckingham, who passed through the village ("El Mukalid") in 1816, described it as still "rather poor", while noting that the village resembled an Egyptian one in form and constructions of its huts.

In the 19th century, Umm Khalid was a rest area between al-Tantura and Ras al-Ayn, where Ottoman officials stopped and received dignitaries. When Mary Rogers, the sister of the British vice-consul in Haifa, visited the Umm Khalid in 1856 she described it as a flourishing village, and noted the extensive watermelon gardens to the west of the village.

In 1863, Victor Guérin found the village to have about 300 inhabitants. In 1873, among the ruins were seen a vaulted building with remnants of a second story, a well built well, and six circular rock-cut granaries.

In 1870/1871 (1288 AH), an Ottoman census listed the village in the nahiya (sub-district) of Wadi al-Sha'ir.

In 1882, the PEF's Survey of Western Palestine (SWP) described the village as "A small mud village, with ruins, and a sacred place to the south. On the east is a good masonry well, with troughs and a wheel for raising the water. ... There are also cisterns, and a pond with mud banks. There are cornfields to the east, but the soil is very sandy. The place is famous for its water melons, which are shipped at the little harbour called Minet Abu Zabura."

=== British Mandate period ===
In the 1922 census of Palestine there were 307 villagers, all Muslim, increasing in the 1931 census to 586; 580 Muslims and 6 Christians, in a total of 131 houses.

At the village center was a mosque, an elementary school for boys, and four shops for groceries and fabrics. In the 1944/45 statistics, Um Khalid had 970 inhabitants; 960 Muslims and 10 Christians, with a total of 2,894 dunums of land. Of this, a total of 47 dunums were used for citrus and bananas, while 1,830 dunums were planted with cereals. At the same time, it was registered that 2,894 dunums of land was Arab owned, 882 Jewish owned, while 89 dunam was public property.

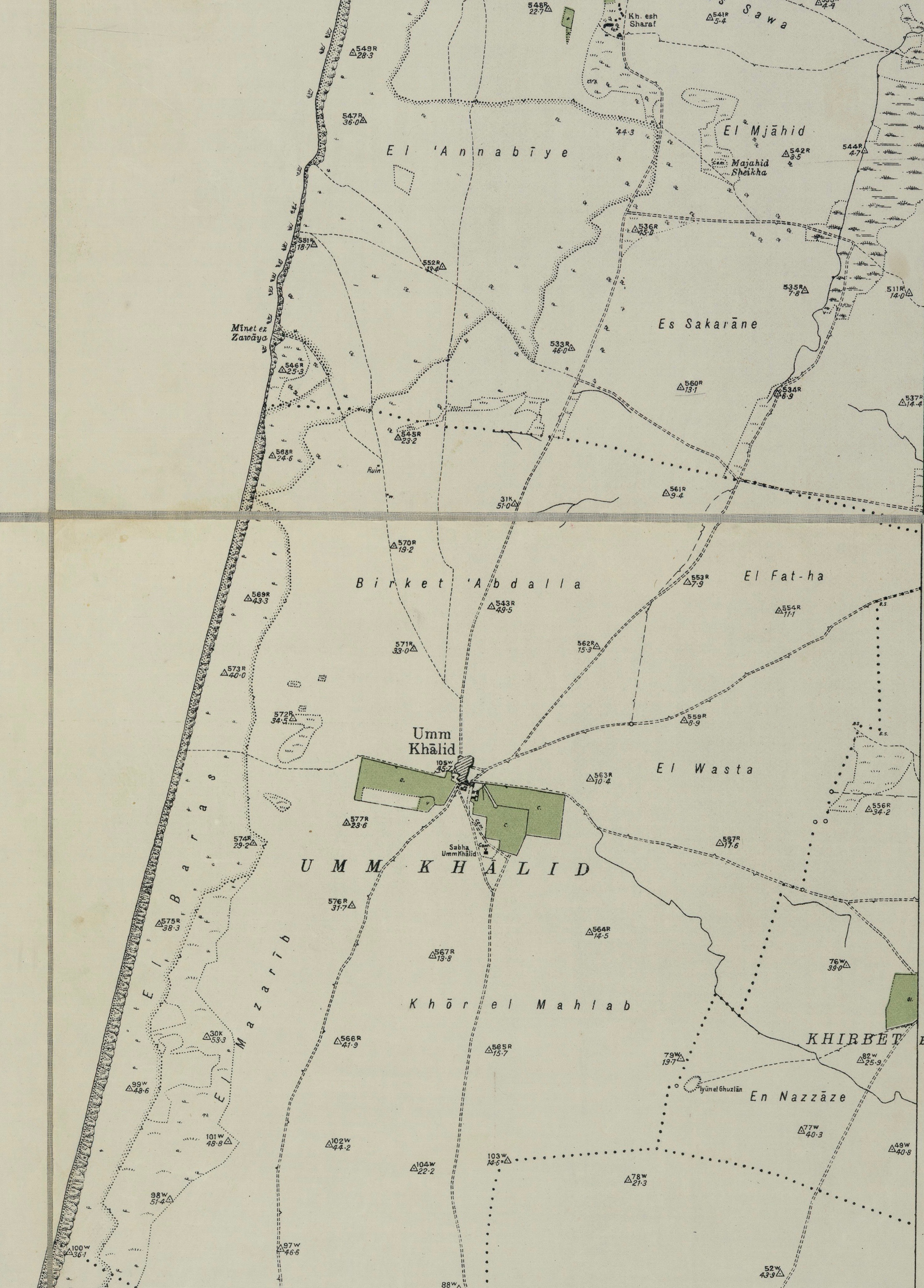
Umm Khalid 1929 1:20,000

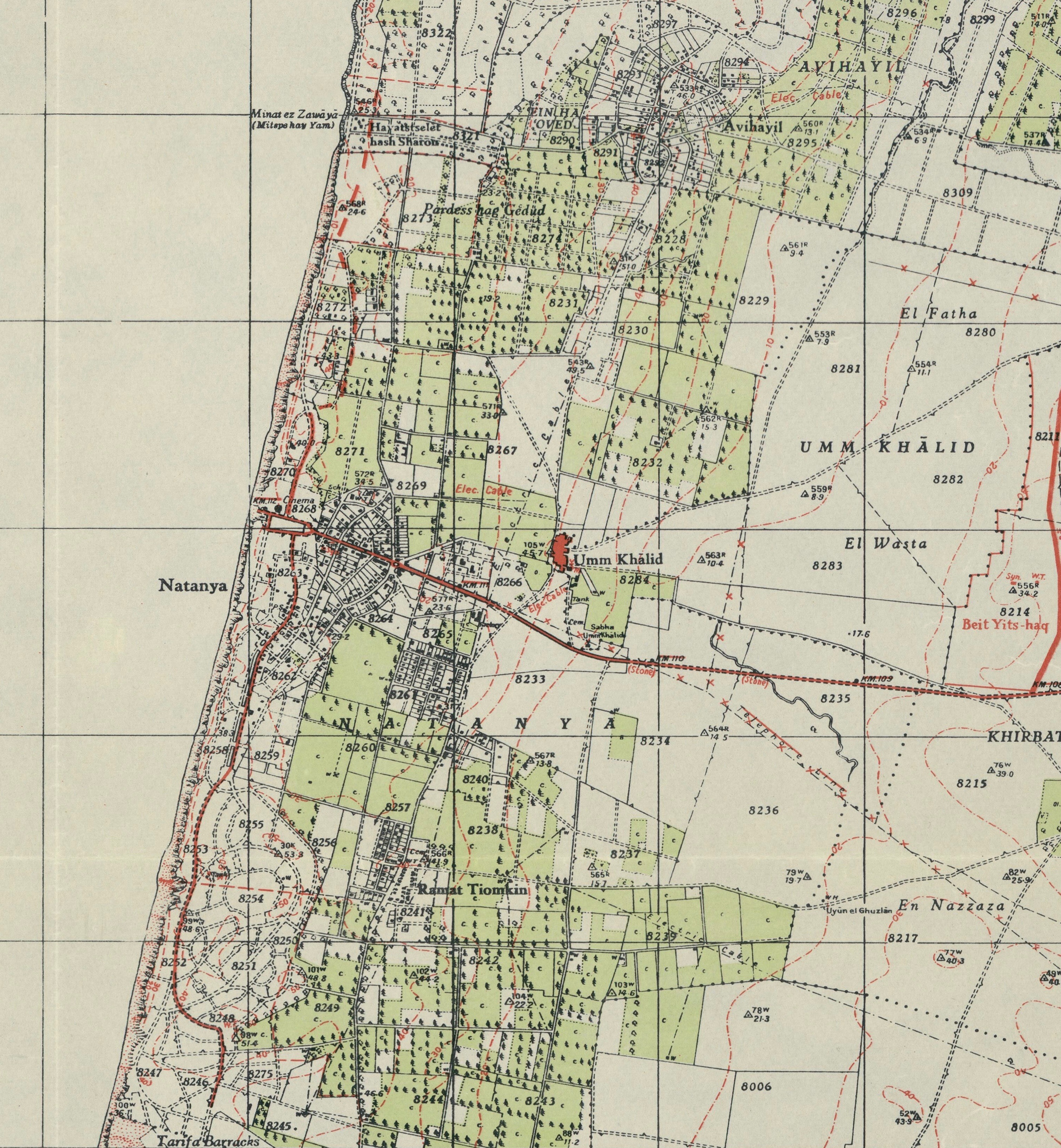
Umm Khalid 1939 1:20,000

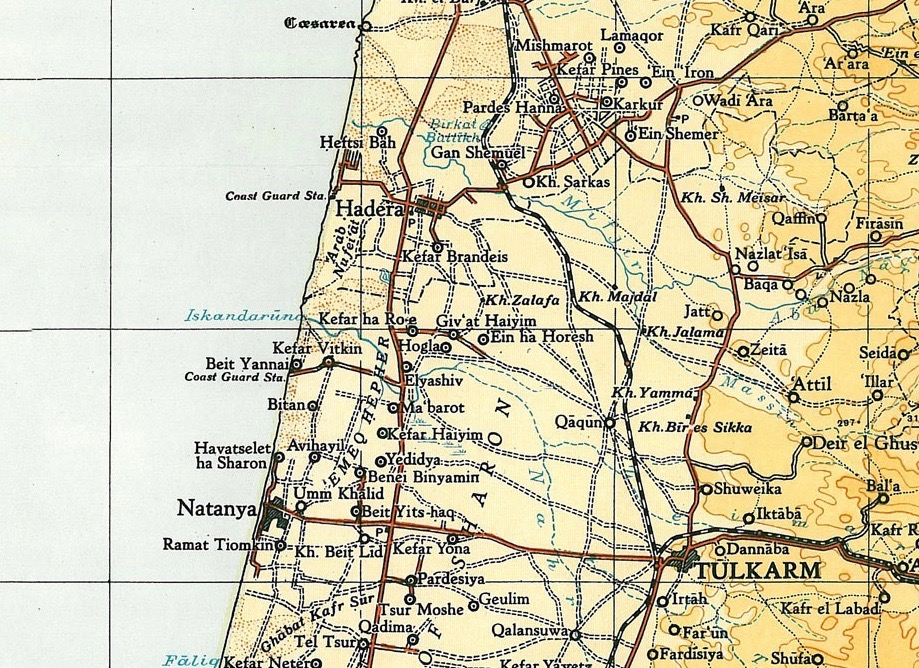
Umm Khalid 1945 1:250,000

=== 1948 and after ===
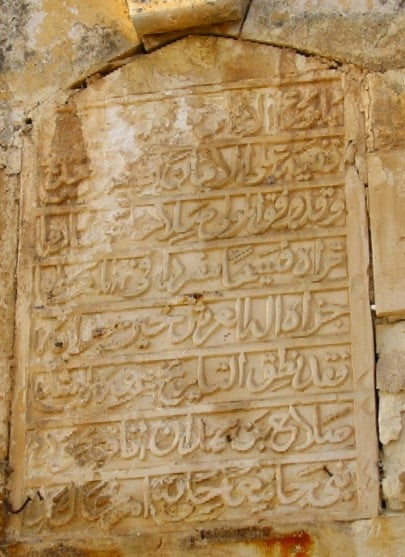
Umm Khalid Mosque Inscription

According to an Israeli military report, Umm Khalid was evacuated 20 March 1948. Walid Khalidi speculates that the village was located in an area which was regarded by the Zionist leadership as the core of the planned Jewish state and would therefore have been desirable that the Arab residents were made to leave before 15 May.

The American historian Rosemarie Esber interviewed refugees from Umm Khalid. According to Ahamed 'Uthman, Zionist surrounded and blockaded the village in 1947, and continued into 1948:

[The Jews] did not allow any to enter or leave the village. They did not allow us to sell or buy anything from outside the village.....After a month of the Jewish blockade, some families left. [..] We had been awaiting the end of the blockade, but it would not end unless the people left...They were shooting, but not heavily. They shot from outside the village to make the villagers afraid. No one returned to Umm Khalid. We were not allowed to return....Jews killed many people in Mlabis and in many other places....What did they do in Dayr Yassin?...I thank God we left before they entered the village."

Much of the village land has been engulfed by the suburbs of the city of Netanya, founded in 1929 one kilometer to the west. The settlement of Gan Chefer, founded in 1940, and Nira, founded in 1941, were merged in 1953 to form a single, large settlement named Sha'ar Hefer; this settlement covers part of the village land.

According to the Palestinian historian Walid Khalidi, the structures on the village land were in 1992: "The village site has become part of the city of Netanya. Some houses remain and are used either as residences or for commercial purposes such as warehouses for Israeli companies. The land in the vicinity are planted in citrus trees.

In 1997, bulldozers leveling ground for a school building in Netanya uncovered remains of the cemetery of Umm Khalid. The Aqsa Association for the Preservation of Consecrated Islamic Property petitioned the High Court of Justice. As a result, the city of Netanya agreed to halt work in the area which had not been damaged, and to put up a sign: "Here is the Muslim cemetery of the village Umm Khalid." The Muslims refused to accept that the area should be turned into a park, stating that "No foot shall tread on the graves."

== See also ==
- Mahmoud Hamshari

== Bibliography ==
- Ad, Uzi (2009-07-15). "Netanya". Hadashot Arkheologiyot – Excavations and Surveys in Israel (121).
- Barron, J.B., ed. (1923). Palestine: Report and General Abstracts of the Census of 1922. Government of Palestine.
- Benvenisti, M. (2001). Sacred Landscape: The Buried History of the Holy Land Since 1948. University of California Press. ISBN 978-0-520-23422-2.
- Buckingham, J.S. (1822). Travels in Palestine through the countries of Bashan and Gilead, east of the River Jordan, including a visit to the cities of Geraza and Gamala in the Decapolis. Vol. 1. London: Longman, Hurst, Rees, Orme and Brown.
- Conder, C.R.; Kitchener, H.H. (1882). The Survey of Western Palestine: Memoirs of the Topography, Orography, Hydrography, and Archaeology. Vol. 2. London: Committee of the Palestine Exploration Fund.
- Department of Statistics (1945). Village Statistics, April, 1945. Government of Palestine.
- Esber, R. M. (2008). Under the Cover of War, The Zionist Expulsions of the Palestinians. Arabicus Books & Media. ISBN 9780981513171.
- Guérin, V. (1875). Description Géographique Historique et Archéologique de la Palestine (in French). Vol. 2: Samarie, pt. 2. Paris: L'Imprimerie Nationale.
- Hadawi, S. (1970). Village Statistics of 1945: A Classification of Land and Area ownership in Palestine. Palestine Liberation Organization Research Center.
- Karmon, Y. (1960). "An Analysis of Jacotin's Map of Palestine" (PDF). Israel Exploration Journal. 10 (3, 4): 155–173, 244–253. Archived from the original (PDF) on 2019-12-22.
- Khalidi, W. (1992). All That Remains: The Palestinian Villages Occupied and Depopulated by Israel in 1948. Washington D.C.: Institute for Palestine Studies. ISBN 0-88728-224-5.
- Mills, E., ed. (1932). Census of Palestine 1931. Population of Villages, Towns and Administrative Areas. Jerusalem: Government of Palestine.
- Morris, B. (2004). Birth of the Palestinian Refugee Problem Revisited. Cambridge University Press. ISBN 0-521-00967-7.
- Palmer, E.H. (1881). The Survey of Western Palestine: Arabic and English Name Lists Collected During the Survey by Lieutenants Conder and Kitchener, R. E. Transliterated and Explained by E.H. Palmer. Committee of the Palestine Exploration Fund.
- Pringle, D. (1997). Secular buildings in the Crusader Kingdom of Jerusalem: an archaeological Gazetter. Cambridge University Press. ISBN 0521-46010-7.
- Rogers, Mary Eliza (1862). Domestic Life in Palestine. Bell & Daldy.
- Toueg, Ron (2016-03-16). "Netanya, Ben-Ami Neighborhood (Umm Khalid)". Hadashot Arkheologiyot – Excavations and Surveys in Israel (128).
- Wilson, C.W., ed. (c. 1881). Picturesque Palestine, Sinai and Egypt. Vol. 3. New York: D. Appleton.
