= Bayt Shanna =

Bayt Shanna بيت شنّة
- Etymology: The house of Shenna
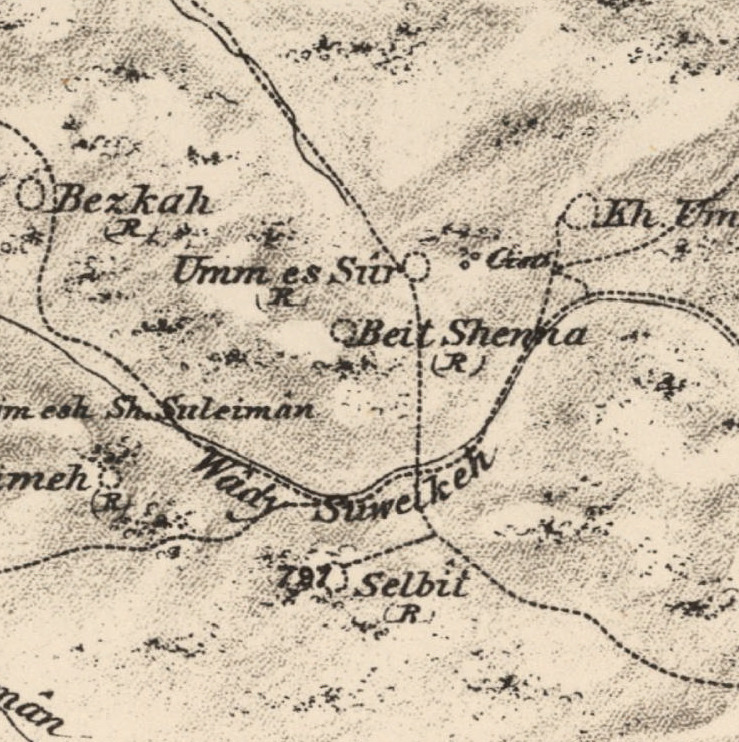
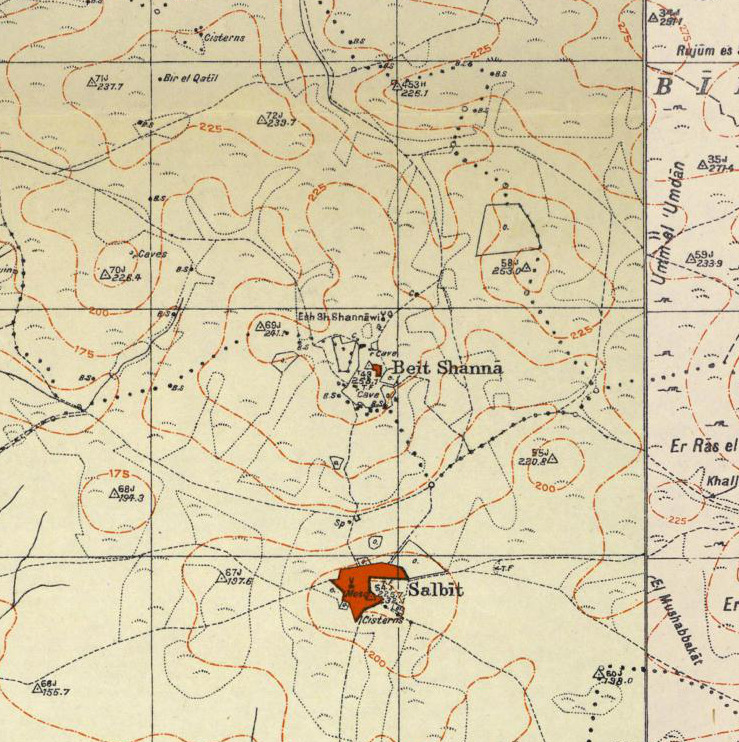
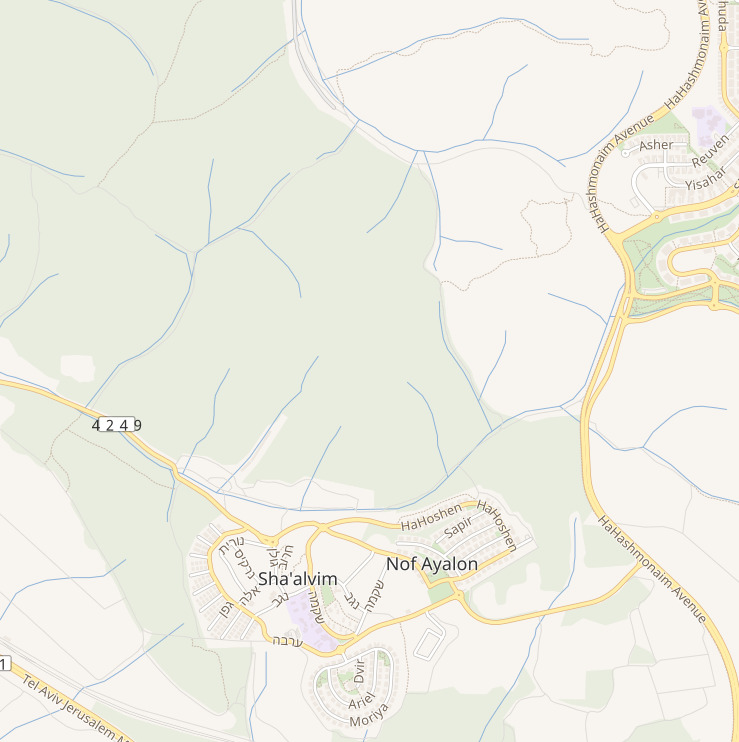
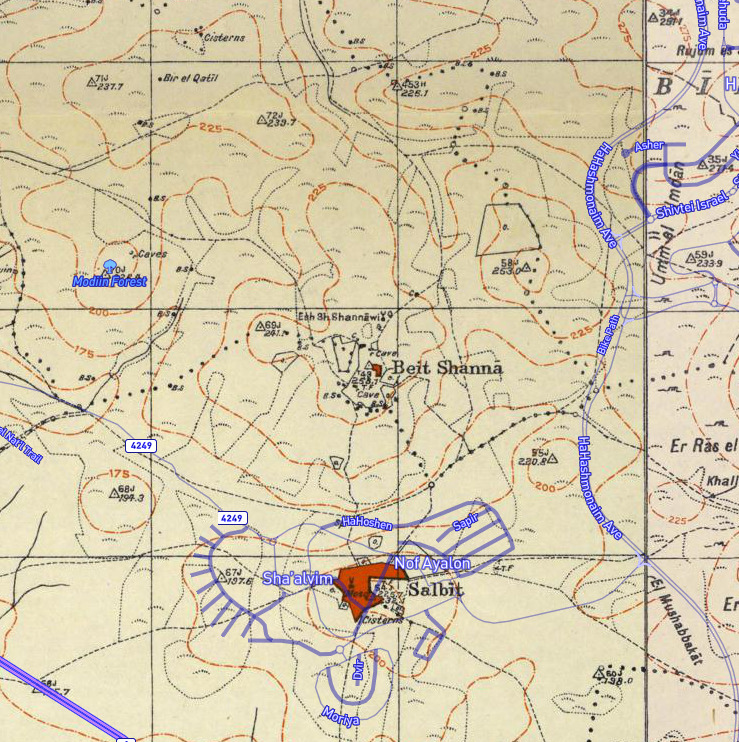
- 1870s map 1940s map modern map 1940s with modern overlay map A series of historical maps of the area around Bayt Shanna (click the buttons)

- Location within Mandatory Palestine
- Coordinates: 31°52′39″N 34°59′13″E
- Palestine grid: 148/142
- Geopolitical entity: Mandatory Palestine
- Subdistrict: Ramle
- Date of depopulation: July 15–16, 1948

Population (1945)
  - Total: 210
- Cause(s) of depopulation: Military assault by Yishuv forces

Bayt Shanna was a Palestinian Arab village in the Ramle Subdistrict of Mandatory Palestine. It was depopulated during the 1948 Arab–Israeli War on July 15, 1948, during the second stage of Operation Dani. It was located 11.5 km southeast of Ramla.

== Etymology ==
Bayt šannā /Bēt šanna/ is an Aramaic place-name, which means "House of the Rock" (šn’). A rarely documented variant in 16th century endowment deeds reads Bayt al-šunnāra /Bēt iš-šunnāra/ [53], "the place of the cat (or ‘of the partridge’)".

== History ==
Ceramics from the Byzantine era have been found here.

=== Ottoman era ===
Bayt Shanna was incorporated into the Ottoman Empire in 1517 with all of Palestine.

In 1552, Bayt Shanna was an inhabited village. Haseki Hürrem Sultan, the favourite wife of Suleiman the Magnificent, endowed the tax revenues of Bayt Shanna to her Haseki Sultan Imaret in Jerusalem. Administratively, the village belonged to the Sub-district of Ramla in the District of Gaza.

In 1596, it appeared in the tax registers under the name of Bayt Sanna, as being in the nahiya ("subdistrict") of Ramla, which was under the administration of the liwa ("district") of Gaza. It had a population of four household; an estimated 22 persons, who were all Muslims. They paid a fixed tax-rate of 25% on agricultural products, including wheat, barley, summer crops, vineyards, fruit trees, goats and beehives, in addition to occasional revenues; a total of 1,000 Akçe. All of the revenue went to a Waqf.

In 1838, it was noted as Beit Shinna, a place "in ruins or deserted," in the Ibn Humar area in the District of Er-Ramleh.

In 1883, the PEF's Survey of Western Palestine noted at Beit Shenna: "Traces of ruins and squared stones."

By the beginning of the 20th century, residents from Beit Surik settled the site, establishing it as a dependency – or satellite village – of their home village.

=== British Mandate era ===
In the 1922 census of Palestine, conducted by the British Mandate authorities, Bait Shanna had a population of 8 Muslims, increasing in the 1931 census, when it was counted together with Salbit, to 406, still all Muslims, in a total of 71 houses.

In the 1945 statistics, the village had a population of 210 Muslims with 3,617 dunams of land. Of this, 44 dunams were used for plantations and irrigable land, 865 for cereals, while 2,708 dunams were non-cultivable areas.

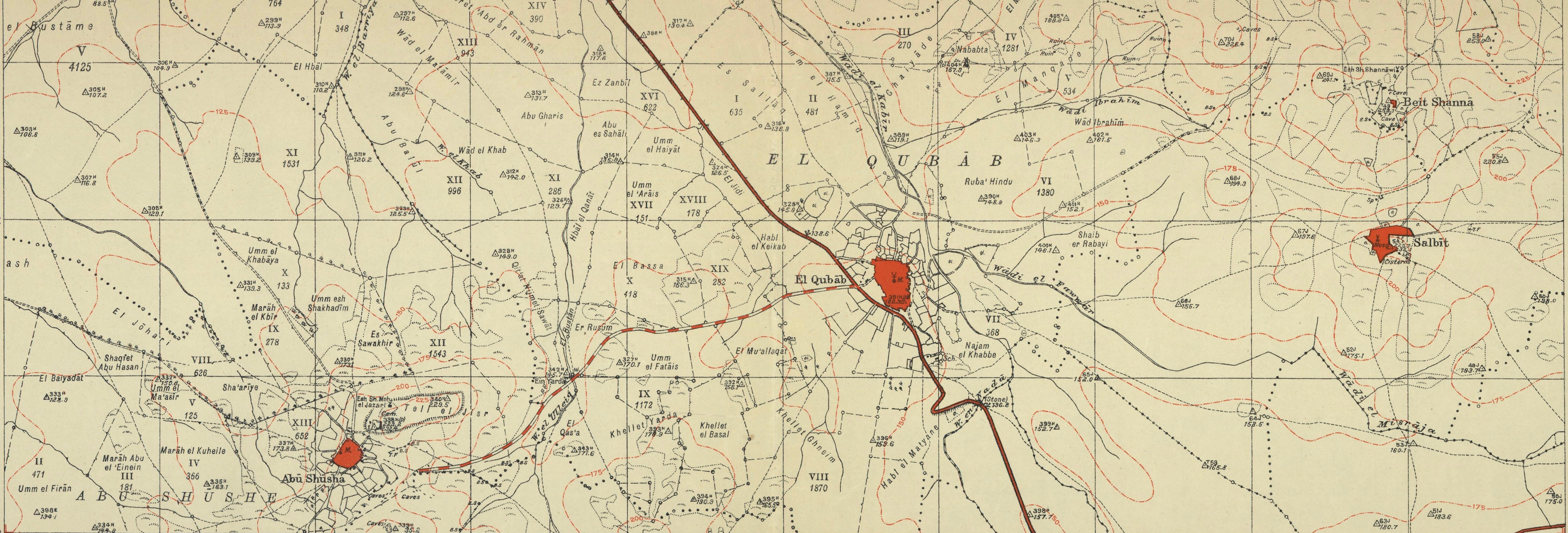
Bayt Shanna 1942 1:20,000

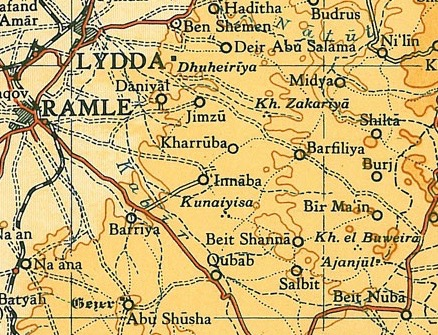
Bayt Shanna 1945 Scale 1:250,000

=== 1948, and aftermath ===
Bayt Shanna became depopulated after a military assault on July 15–16, 1948.

As of 1992, there were no Israeli settlement on village land. Sha'alvim, on the land of the depopulated Palestinian village of Salbit is the closest.

In 1992, the village site was described: "The stone rubble of the former houses covers the village site. Large mulberry, olive, and almond trees grow amid the rubble, most of which is covered by wild vegetation. The whole site is fenced in and appears to be used as a grazing area. On the hillside east of the village, a room made of masonry still stands. Fruit trees grow around it."

== Bibliography ==
- Barron, J.B., ed. (1923). Palestine: Report and General Abstracts of the Census of 1922. Government of Palestine.
- Conder, C.R.; Kitchener, H.H. (1883). The Survey of Western Palestine: Memoirs of the Topography, Orography, Hydrography, and Archaeology. Vol. 3. London: Committee of the Palestine Exploration Fund.
- Dauphin, C. (1998). La Palestine byzantine, Peuplement et Populations. BAR International Series 726 (in French). Vol. III : Catalogue. Oxford: Archeopress. ISBN 0-860549-05-4.
- Department of Statistics (1945). Village Statistics, April, 1945. Government of Palestine.
- Hadawi, S. (1970). Village Statistics of 1945: A Classification of Land and Area ownership in Palestine. Palestine Liberation Organization Research Center.
- Hütteroth, W.-D.; Abdulfattah, K. (1977). Historical Geography of Palestine, Transjordan and Southern Syria in the Late 16th Century. Erlanger Geographische Arbeiten, Sonderband 5. Erlangen, Germany: Vorstand der Fränkischen Geographischen Gesellschaft. ISBN 3-920405-41-2.
- Khalidi, W. (1992). All That Remains: The Palestinian Villages Occupied and Depopulated by Israel in 1948. Washington D.C.: Institute for Palestine Studies. ISBN 0-88728-224-5.
- Mills, E., ed. (1932). Census of Palestine 1931. Population of Villages, Towns and Administrative Areas. Jerusalem: Government of Palestine.
- Morris, B. (2004). The Birth of the Palestinian Refugee Problem Revisited. Cambridge University Press. ISBN 978-0-521-00967-6.
- Palmer, E.H. (1881). The Survey of Western Palestine: Arabic and English Name Lists Collected During the Survey by Lieutenants Conder and Kitchener, R. E. Transliterated and Explained by E.H. Palmer. Committee of the Palestine Exploration Fund.
- Robinson, E.; Smith, E. (1841). Biblical Researches in Palestine, Mount Sinai and Arabia Petraea: A Journal of Travels in the year 1838. Vol. 3. Boston: Crocker & Brewster.
