= Mahmoud Hamshari =

Palestinian Arab diplomat (1938–1973)

- Born: 29 August 1939; Umm Khaled, Tulkarm, Mandatory Palestine
- Died: 9 January 1973 (aged 33); Paris, France
- Cause of death: Assassination
- Burial place: Père Lachaise Cemetery, Paris
- Occupation: Teacher
- Years active: 1960s–1972
- Spouse: Marie-Claude Hamshari

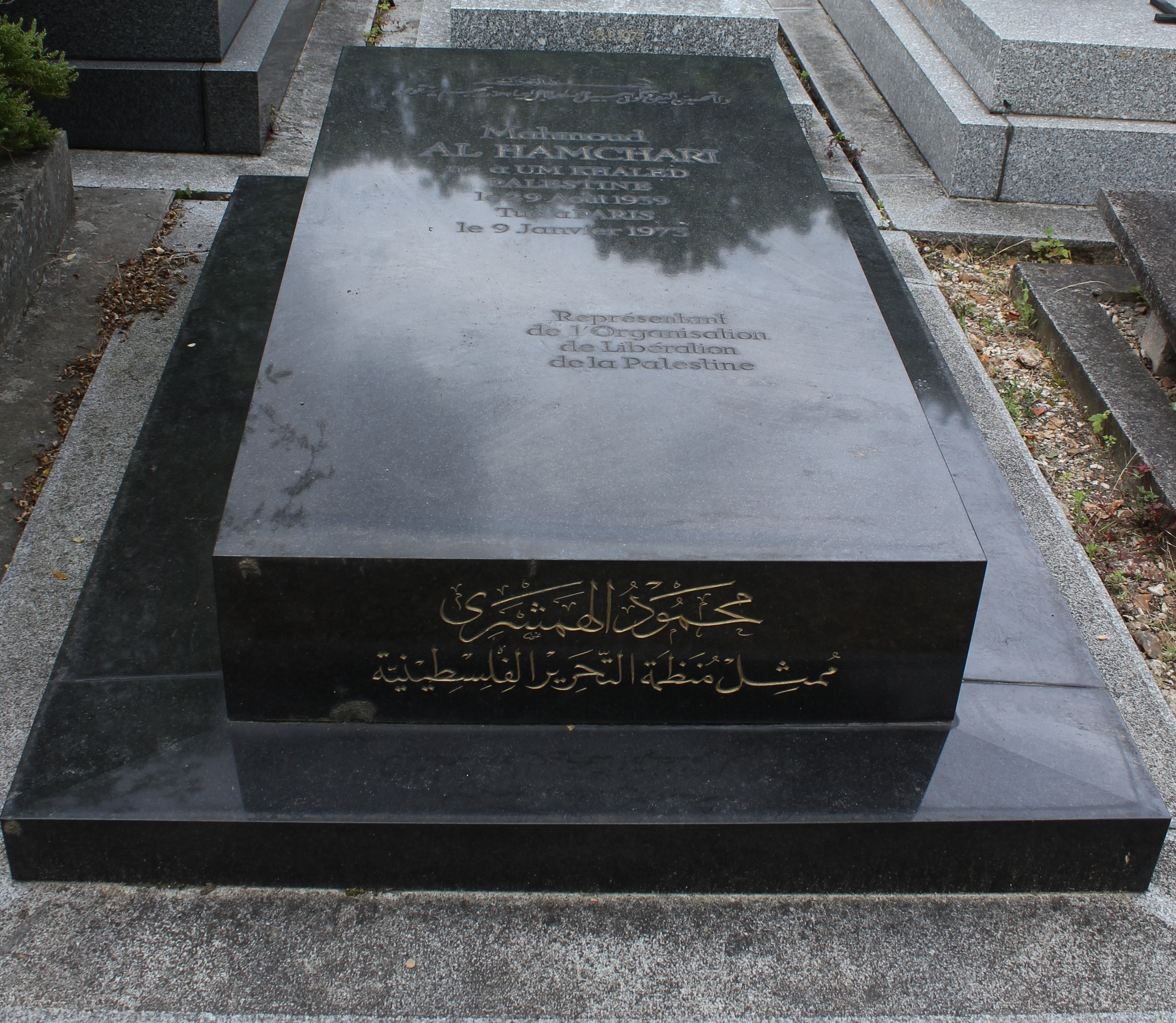
Grave of Hamshari in Père Lachaise Cemetery, Paris

Mahmoud Hamshari (Arabic: محمود الهمشري; 29 August 1939 – 9 January 1973) was a Palestinian official who was assassinated by the Israeli Mossad in Paris, France, on 8 December 1972. He was serving as the representative of the Palestine Liberation Organization (PLO) to France when the incident occurred. He died in a Paris hospital on 9 January 1973.

== Early life and education ==
Hamshari was born in a village, Umm Khaled, west of Tulkarm, on 29 August 1939. The family had to leave Umm Khaled in 1948 when it was occupied by Israel, and the depopulated village was absorbed into the neighbouring town of Netanya. He obtained a PhD in history from a French university.

== Pedagogic career and activism ==
Hamshari worked as a teacher in Kuwait and Algeria. He was a member of the Fatah. He was tasked to organize the Palestinian students in Algeria and worked closely with Khalil al-Wazir, known as Abu Jihad. Hamshari returned to Palestine in 1967 and established the Fatah cells in the region.

Hamshari was appointed representative of the PLO to France in 1968, being the first head of the Palestine office in the country. There he founded a branch of the General Union of Palestinian Students. Through the Union, Hamshari organized the visit of the Swiss film director Jean-Luc Godard to Jordan and Lebanon where he met with the Palestinian fighters in 1969. Elias Sanbar, a member of the Union, accompanied Godard during the visit.

Hamshari was in office until 8 December 1972 when he was badly wounded in a Mossad attack in Paris. After this attack Sadegh Ghotbzadeh, an Iranian who became foreign minister of Iran, temporarily served as the PLO representative in France.

== Personal life ==
Hamshari was married to a French woman, Marie-Claude, and they had a daughter, Amina.

== Assassination ==
Following the killing of Israeli Olympic team members by the Black September Organization in Munich in September 1972, Israel assassinated several leading Palestinian figures. Aharon Yariv, then serving as the prime minister's advisor on counterterrorism, directed the operations targeting Mahmoud Hamshari and other Palestinians. Israeli authorities and media outlets accused Hamshari of direct involvement in the Munich attack, and alleged that he was the head of Black September in France.

A Mossad agent acting as an Italian journalist contacted Hamshari for an interview. When he was meeting with the Mossad agent, a group of Mossad operatives allegedly entered his home and inserted a bomb under a telephone. This group was headed by Zvi Malchin.

Hamshari was severely wounded at his home on Paris's Rue d'Alésia street on the morning of 8 December 1972 by the booby-trapped telephone remotely controlled through a telephone call. He was treated at the Cochin Hospital but lost his leg in the attack. Hamshari was able to provide the French authorities with details of the attack before his death in the hospital on 9 January 1973. He was buried in the Père Lachaise Cemetery, Paris, which was visited by the PLO leader Yasser Arafat on 3 May 1989.

=== Aftermath ===
The following day, Arab diplomats in Paris organized a three-hour press conference and warned that the French government was responsible for their well-being. Israel also launched an information campaign via Western media outlets such as Agence France-Presse and BBC. According to Israel, Hamshari was injured while making an explosive device at his home.

After the assassination of Hamshari, the PLO intensified its attacks on Israelis on the orders of Ali Hassan Salameh. The first attack was carried out by Black September in Thailand in an attempt to take the Israeli ambassador hostage. Then Baruch Cohen, a Mossad intelligence officer, was killed by Black September in Madrid, Spain on 26 January 1973. The PLO claimed that Cohen was part of the Mossad squad that targeted Hamshari.

== Legacy ==
In 1973, the Palestine-Mahmoud Hamshari Prize was established in his memory by L'Association de Solidarite Franco Arabe and the magazine France Pays Arabes. One of the Palestinian Red Crescent hospitals in Lebanon, Mahmoud Hamshari Hospital, was named after him. A primary school for girls in Tulkarm also bears his name.

== In popular culture ==
Anton Shammas's 1986 novel Arabesques mentions Hamshari's grave in the Père Lachaise cemetery. In the novel Shammas draws an analogy between Hamshari and Marcel Proust describing them as a Jew of Time and an Arab of Place because the inscription on Hamshari's grave reads "the man of the lost home" and the inscription on Proust's grave reads "the man of the lost time".

Hamshari is one of the characters in Steven Spielberg's 2005 film Munich. He was portrayed by Igal Naor in the film.
