= Al-Hayat al-Jadida =

Official daily newspaper of the Palestinian National Authority

Al-Hayat al-Jadida الحياة الجديدة
- Type: Daily newspaper
- Owner(s): Palestinian National Authority
- Founder(s): Nabil Amro; Hafeth Al Barghouti
- Editor-in-chief: Arif Hijjawi
- Founded: November 1994; 30 years ago
- Political alignment: Pro-government
- Language: Arabic
- Headquarters: Ramallah
- Country: Palestine
- Website: alhayat-j.com

Al-Hayat al-Jadida (Arabic: الحياة الجديدة, lit. 'The New Life') is an official daily newspaper of the Palestinian National Authority (PNA). The paper was first published in Gaza City in November 1994. It replaced Falastin Al Thawra as the official media organ of the PNA.
