= Salbit =

Salbit سلبيت Selebi, Shaalvim, Shaalbim, Shaalabbin
- Etymology: from personal name
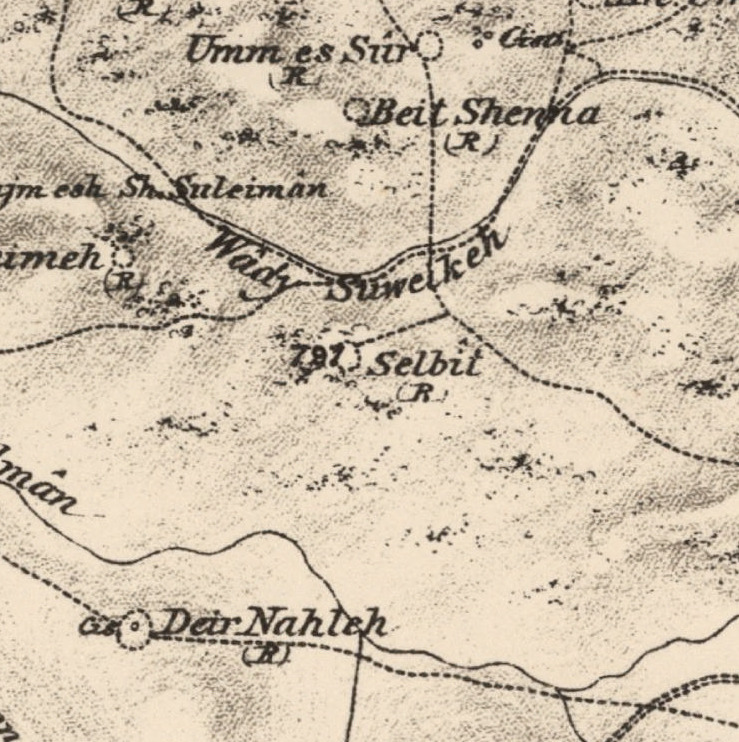
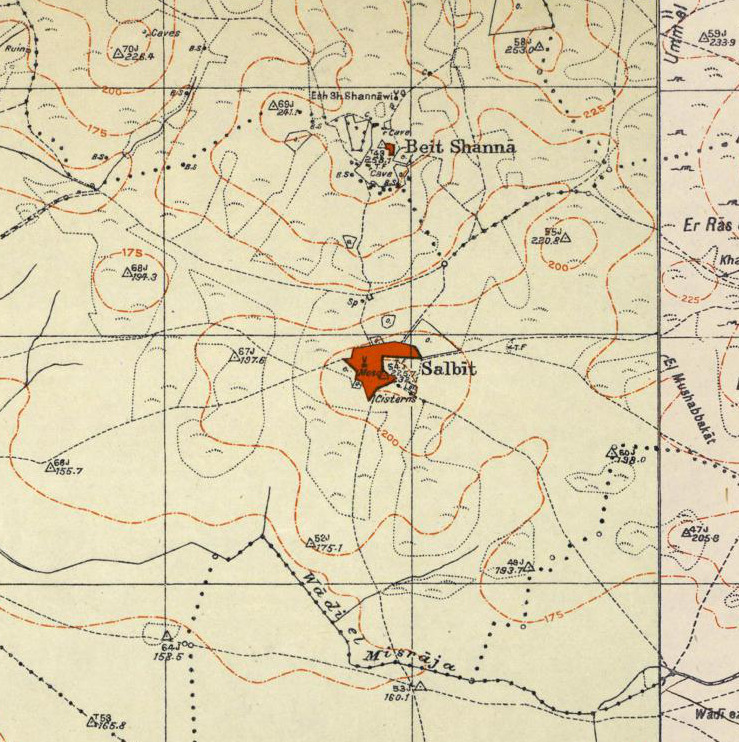
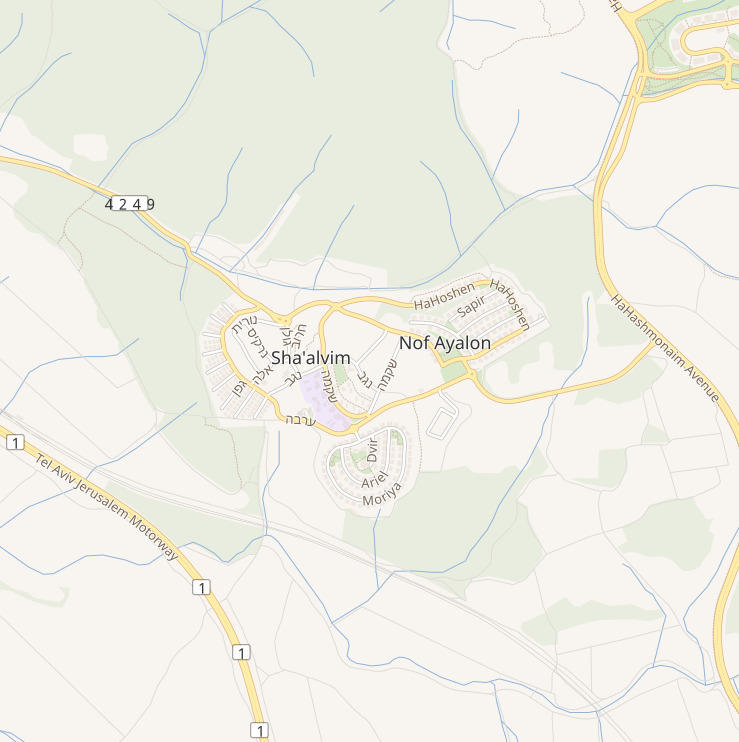
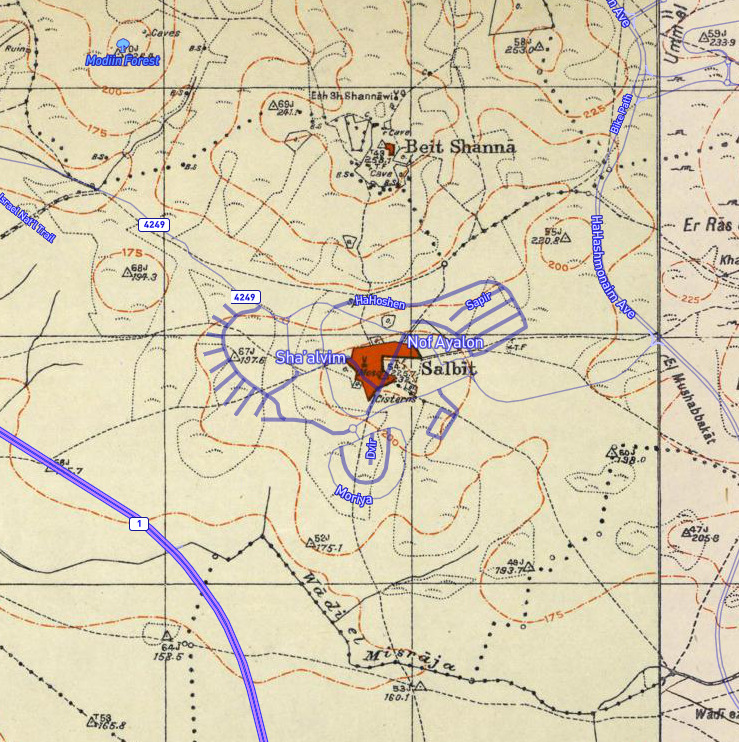
- 1870s map 1940s map modern map 1940s with modern overlay map A series of historical maps of the area around Salbit (click the buttons)

- Location within Mandatory Palestine
- Coordinates: 31°52′10″N 34°59′11″E
- Palestine grid: 148/141
- Geopolitical entity: Mandatory Palestine
- Subdistrict: Ramle
- Date of depopulation: 15–16 July 1948

Area
  - Total: 6,111 dunams (6.111 km^{2}; 2.359 sq mi)

Population (1945)
  - Total: 510
- Cause(s) of depopulation: Military assault by Yishuv forces
- Current Localities: Shaalvim

Salbit (Arabic: سلبيت, also spelled Selbît) was a Palestinian Arab village located 12 kilometers (7.5 mi) southeast of al-Ramla. Salbit was depopulated during the 1948 Arab–Israeli War after a military assault by Israeli forces. The Israeli locality of Shaalvim was established on the former village's lands in 1951.

== History ==
=== Hebrew Bible ===
In 1883 the PEF's Survey of Western Palestine identified Salbit with Shaalabbin (Biblical Hebrew: Šʽlbyn/*Šʽlbyt), which was located 5 kilometers (3.1 mi) northwest of biblical Aijalon (modern day Yalo).

=== Roman and Byzantine periods ===
Jerome (347–420) describes it as part of the territory of the Dan, transcribing its name at that time as Selebi, a form also used by Josephus (37-c. 100).

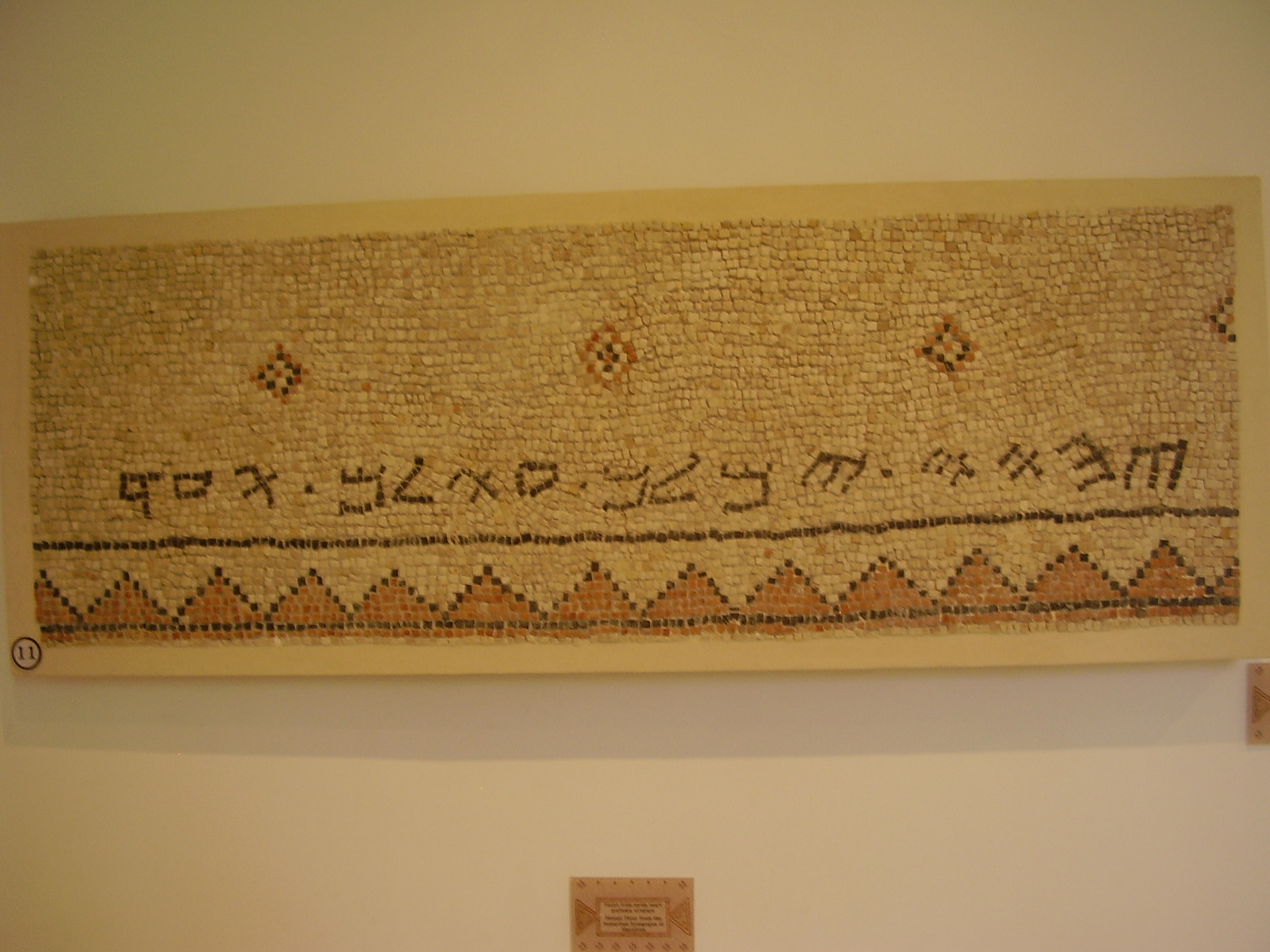
Samaritan inscription reading "The Lord will reign for ever and ever" (Good Samaritan Museum)

In 1949, archaeologists excavated the remains of a Samaritan synagogue there that was dated to the late 4th or early 5th century. Measuring 15.4 × 8 metres, its mosaic floor contains one Greek inscriptions and two in Samaritan (language and script). In the centre of the mosaic is a mountain which is thought to be a depiction of Mount Gerizim, the holiest site in Samaritanism. Rectangular in shape, the synagogue was longitudinally aligned more or less towards Mount Gerizim.

=== Ottoman period ===
Salbit was not mentioned in 16th century records. It was an 'azba of Biddu and nearby villages (including Beit Duqqu and Beit 'Anan).

In 1838, it was noted as Selbit, a Muslim village in the Ibn Humar area in the District of Er-Ramleh.

In 1883 the PEF's Survey of Western Palestine (SWP) described Selbit: "Foundations and caves. The ruins are extensive. A square building stands in the middle. There is a ruined reservoir lined with cement, and walls of rubble."

The village is believed to have been resettled in the late 19th century. By the beginning of the 20th century, it was inhabited by residents from Biddu settled the site, establishing it as a dependency – or satellite village – of their home village.

=== British Mandate ===
In the 1922 census of Palestine, conducted by the British Mandate authorities, Selbit had a population of 296, all Muslims, increasing in the 1931 census, when it was counted together with Bayt Shanna, to 406, still all Muslims, in a total of 71 houses.

The houses in Salbit were made of adobe and stone and were grouped around the village center where the mosque, suq and elementary school was located. The school, built in 1947, had 47 students. The villagers made their living by agriculture and the raising of livestock. The village's drinking water came from a local well.

In the 1945 statistics, the population was 510, all Muslims, while the total land area was 6,111 dunams, according to an official land and population survey. Of this, a total of 4,066 dunums of land were used for cereals, 16 dunums were plantations or irrigated land, while 31 dunams were classified as built-up public areas.

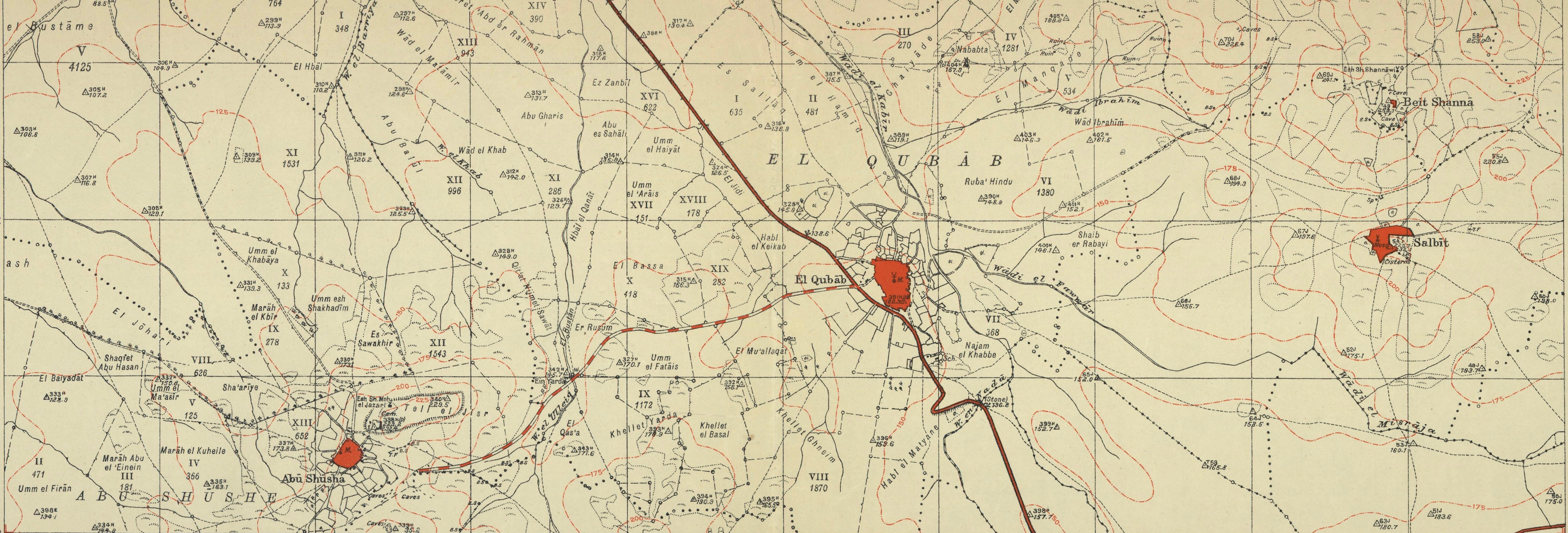
Salbit 1942 1:20,000

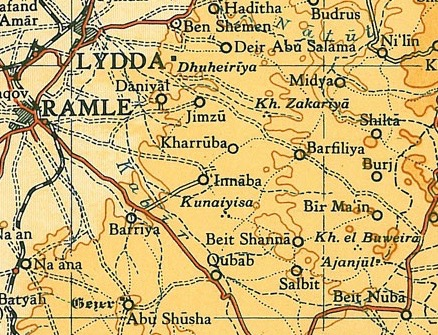
Salbit 1945 Scale 1:250,000

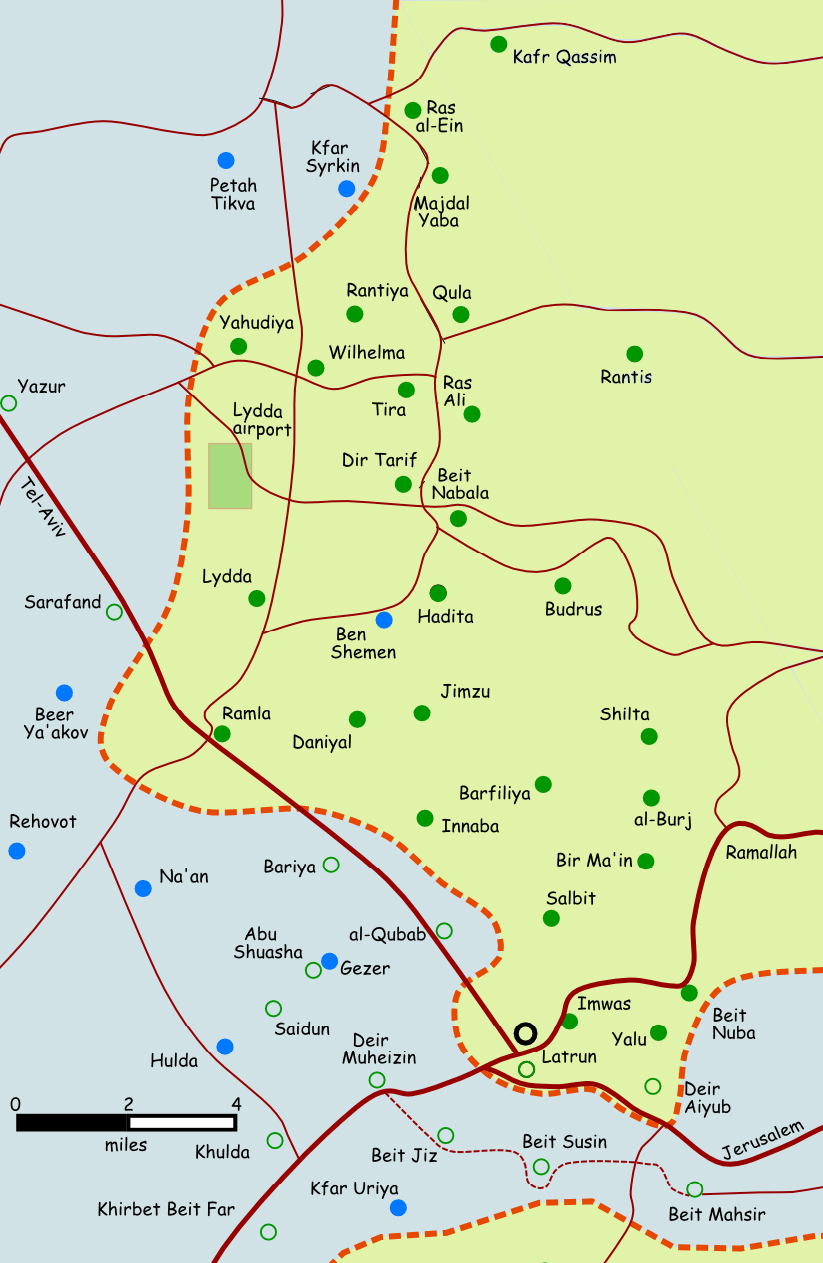
Depopulated villages in the Ramle Subdistrict

=== 1948 war and aftermath ===
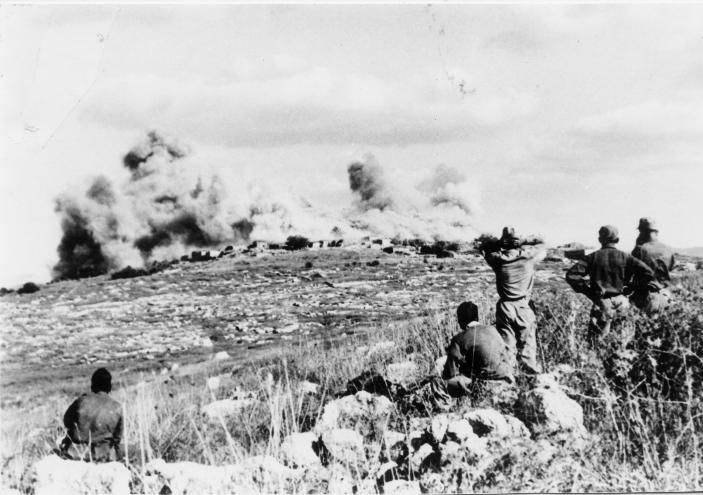
Salbit being destroyed by Harel Brigade sappers. 1948

During the 1948 Arab–Israeli War and the 1948 Palestinian expulsion from Lydda and Ramle, some of those forcibly expelled were bussed to Latrun on the front lines and from there ordered to walk northward to Salbit. The Lydda death march, as it also became known as, brought hundreds of refugee families to Salbit where they took shelter in a fig grove and were given water and rest for the night before trucks from the Arab Legion began moving some of the families to a Palestinian refugee camp in Ramallah.

Salbit itself was depopulated after a military assault by Israeli forces on 15–16 July 1948. After its depopulation, Israeli forces headed by Yigal Allon used it as a base from which to launch an attack on the strategic hill of Latrun on 18 July, which was spurned by the forces of the Arab Legion who managed to hold on to the site without inflicting any casualties on the Israeli forces. The village structures of Salbit were subsequently completely destroyed, and according to Walid Khalidi, all that remains of the village today are "some cactus plants and shrubs." The estimated number of Palestinian refugees from Salbit as of 1998 was 3,633.

The kibbutz of Shaalvim, named per the site's biblical place name, was established on the former village lands on 13 August 1951 by a Nahal group from the ESRA movement.

== Bibliography ==
- Barnes, W.E. (1932). The first book of the Kings. CUP Archive. p. 31. GGKEY:BG3S2C5ERWZ.
- Barron, JB., ed. (1923). Palestine: Report and General Abstracts of the Census of 1922. Government of Palestine.
- Conder, C.R.; Kitchener, H. H. (1883). The Survey of Western Palestine: Memoirs of the Topography, Orography, Hydrography, and Archaeology. Vol. 3. London: Committee of the Palestine Exploration Fund.
- Cooke, G.A. (1918). The Book of Joshua – In the Revised Version with Introduction and Notes. Cambridge University Press.
- Dauphin, C. (1998). La Palestine byzantine, Peuplement et Populations. BAR International Series 726 (in French). Vol. III : Catalogue. Oxford: Archeopress. ISBN 0-860549-05-4.
- Department of Statistics (1945). Village Statistics, April, 1945. Government of Palestine.
- Hadawi, S. (1970). Village Statistics of 1945: A Classification of Land and Area ownership in Palestine. Palestine Liberation Organization Research Center.
- Khalidi, W. (1992). All That Remains: The Palestinian Villages Occupied and Depopulated by Israel in 1948. Washington D.C.: Institute for Palestine Studies. ISBN 0-88728-224-5.
- Mills, E., ed. (1932). Census of Palestine 1931. Population of Villages, Towns and Administrative Areas. Jerusalem: Government of Palestine.
- Morris, B. (2004). The Birth of the Palestinian Refugee Problem Revisited. Cambridge University Press. ISBN 978-0-521-00967-6.
- Palmer, E.H. (1881). The Survey of Western Palestine: Arabic and English Name Lists Collected During the Survey by Lieutenants Conder and Kitchener, R. E. Transliterated and Explained by E.H. Palmer. Committee of the Palestine Exploration Fund.
- Pringle, D. (1998). The Churches of the Crusader Kingdom of Jerusalem: L-Z (excluding Tyre). Vol. II. Cambridge University Press. ISBN 0-521-39037-0.
- Robinson, E.; Smith, E. (1841). Biblical Researches in Palestine, Mount Sinai and Arabia Petraea: A Journal of Travels in the year 1838. Vol. 3. Boston: Crocker & Brewster.
- Dictionary of Greek and Roman Geography: Iabadius-Zymethus
- Stemberger, Günter (2000). Jews and Christians in the Holy Land: Palestine in the fourth century. Continuum International Publishing Group. ISBN 0567-23050-3.
- Tal, D. (2004). War in Palestine, 1948: strategy and diplomacy. Routledge. ISBN 978-0-7146-5275-7.
- Taylor, J. E. (1993). Christians and the holy places: the myth of Jewish-Christian origins. Clarendon Press. ISBN 978-0-19-814785-5.
