= General Union of Palestinian Students =

Student organization

Logo of the General Union of Palestinian Students

The General Union of Palestine Students (GUPS; Arabic: الإتحاد العام لطلبة فلسطين, romanized: Alatahad Alaam Latalbah Falastin) is a Palestinian student organization. Formed in the 1920s, it is generally considered one of the first Palestinian institutions. It was officially launched in Cairo in 1959, with chapters formed in universities all over the Arab world. Considered "the first Palestinian sectoral organization to re-emerge after the 1948 dispersal," the General Union of Palestine Students "came to play a leading role in Palestinian organizational life" and helped form a cohort of leaders that would play prominent roles later on in the Palestine Liberation Organization.

Following the Oslo Accords, the majority of GUPS chapters collapsed. Prior to the signing of the Accords, there were 60 GUPS chapters on US campuses. Today, only the San Francisco State University chapter remains operational in the United States. Several GUPS chapters remain operational in Europe and South America, including in Chile and the United Kingdom. The organization is a member of the World Federation of Democratic Youth.

== Notable individuals ==
Several Palestinian politicians, writers, journalists and militants have been members or leaders of the GUPS. They include Yasser Arafat, Hanan Ashrawi, Faisal Husseini, Walid Khalidi, Mahmoud Hamshari, Afif Safieh, Elias Sanbar, Ahmad Abdel Rahman and many others.

Nearing the end of the 1948 Arab–Israeli War Yasser Arafat moved to Cairo in order to re-enrol in the University of King Fuad I, later known as Cairo University, studying civil engineering and serving as chairman of the GUPS from 1952 until the year of his graduation of 1956 as well as the chairman of the Federation of Palestinian Students, both considered important positions in Palestinian politics. Abu Iyad served as Secretary General of GUPS whilst studying at Al Azhar University before being deported by Egyptian secret police to Gaza in 1983 during the last year of his studies. The pair along with Khaled Yashruti, the then head of GUPS in Beirut, and others later formed Fatah in 1959.

== Political significance ==
Drawing from the work of scholar Laurie Brand, the political scientist Khalil Shikaki summarizes the significance of the GUPS as follows:

In the absence of a political 'center,' the Palestine Student Union (later GUPS) served as the major political forum in which Palestinian feelings and aspirations could be expressed, and in which independent Palestinian mobilization and organizing activities could be carried out. In 1959, long before the famous 1974 Rabat summit resolution recognizing PLO representation of the Palestinians, GUPS concluded an agreement with Jordanian student unions designating Palestinian students from the West Bank as the constituency of GUPS alone. During GUPS's second conference in Gaza in 1962, resolutions were approved calling for the establishment of a Palestinian entity, a Palestinian army, and a Palestinian liberation organization.

From 1979 to 1989, the Federal Bureau of Investigation was "conducting a sprawling international terrorism investigation" into GUPS. It was not an investigation of criminal conduct, but intelligence monitoring.

== See also ==
- Palestinian nationalism
- Palestine Liberation Organization
