= Sha'alvim =

Kibbutz in central Israel

Sha'alvim: שַׁעַלְבִים (Hebrew)
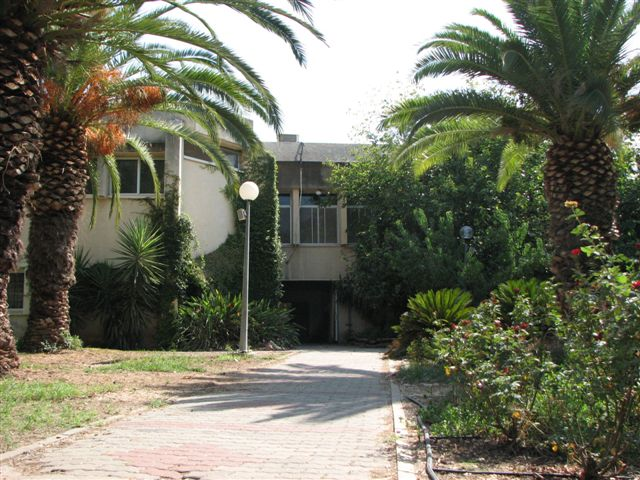

- Location within Central Israel
- Coordinates: 31°52′7″N 34°59′7″E
- Country: Israel
- District: Central
- Subdistrict: Ramla
- Council: Gezer
- Affiliation: Poalei Agudat Yisrael
- Founded: 13 August 1951
- Founder: Ezra-Nahal Members
- Population (2024): 1,987

Sha'alvim (Hebrew: שַׁעַלְבִים) is a religious kibbutz in central Israel and one of only two affiliated with Poalei Agudat Yisrael (Hafetz Haim being the other). Located near the city of Modi'in-Maccabim-Re'ut, it falls under the jurisdiction of Gezer Regional Council. In 2024 it had a population of 1,987.

== History ==
Sha'alvim is named after the ancient village of the same name that was located in the area and is mentioned in the Bible, in the Books of Joshua, Judges, and Kings. Later, archaeological evidence appears in the form of a letter written four years after the end of the Bar Kokhba revolt (140 CE) by a Jewish woman named Miriam barat Yaakov, which states that she was from the same settlement, which was then named Sha'alab (סעלב). Subsequently, Samaritans settled in the region and established a synagogue.

During the 18th and 19th centuries, the area of Sha'alvim belonged to the Nahiyeh (sub-district) of Lod that encompassed the area of the present-day city of Modi'in-Maccabim-Re'ut in the south to the present-day city of El’ad in the north, and from the foothills in the east, through the Lod Valley to the outskirts of Jaffa in the west. This area was home to thousands of inhabitants in about 20 villages, who had at their disposal tens of thousands of hectares of prime agricultural land.

The kibbutz was founded on 13 August 1951 by a Nahal group from the Ezra movement, on land near the depopulated Palestinian village of Salbit. It was named after a biblical location mentioned in Joshua. Judges, and Kings, probably located here. The hill between the kibbutz and Nof Ayalon is commonly known as Tel Sha'alvim. Until the Six-Day War it was a target of numerous attacks from the West Bank due to its proximity to the Green Line. According to a document captured from the Jordanian Arab Legion, the legion was planning to attack the village and massacre all its residents.

In 1961, a yeshiva, Yeshivat Sha'alvim, was founded in Sha'alvim, and later became a large regional religious education facility.
