= Psalm 52 =

Book of Psalms, chapter 52

- "Why boastest thou thyself in mischief, O mighty man?"
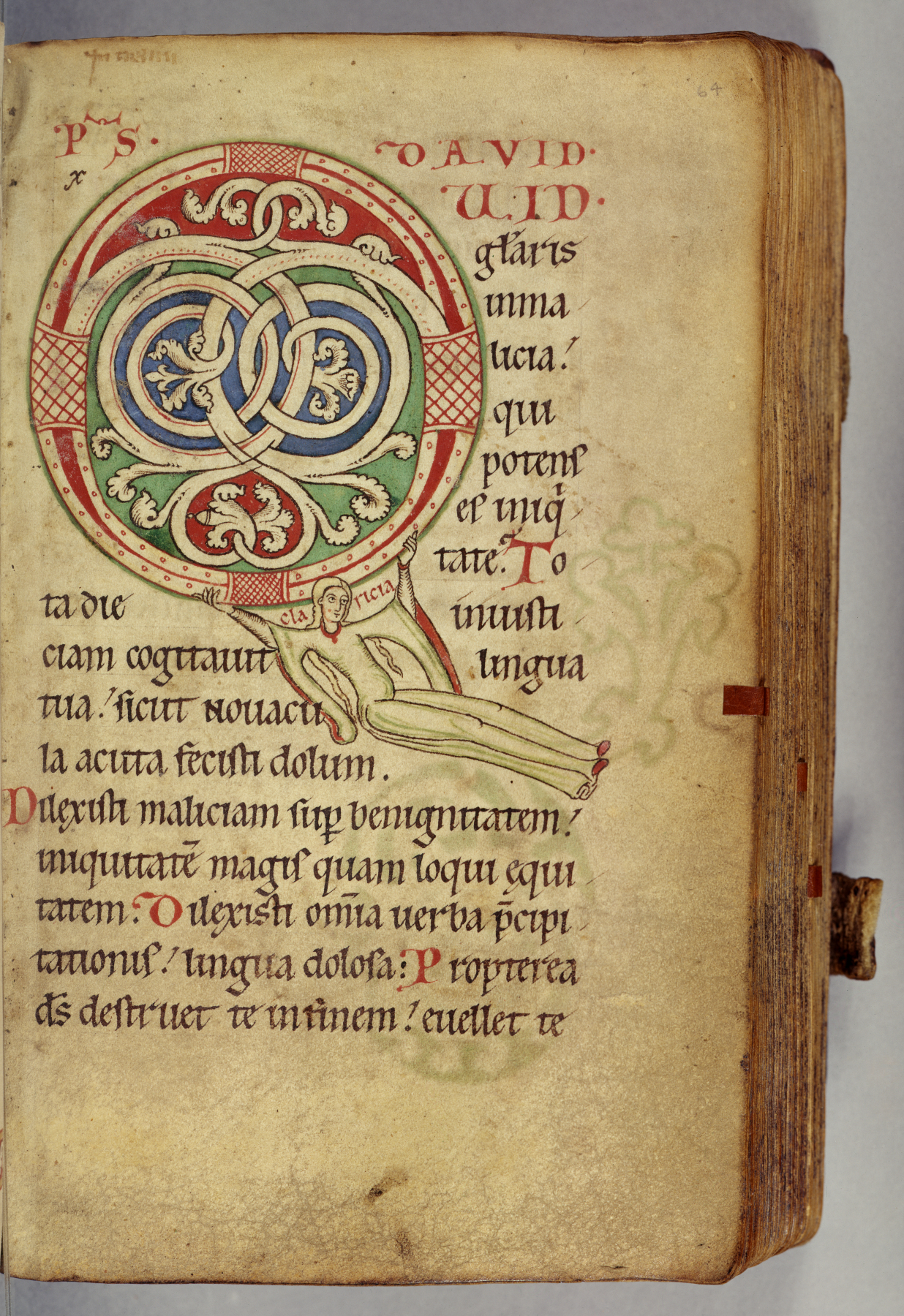
- Beginning of Psalm 52 in Claricia's Psalter
- Other name: Psalm 51; "Quid gloriatur in malitia"
- Text: Attributed to King David
- Language: Hebrew (original)

Psalm 52
- ← Psalm 51 Psalm 53 →
- Book: Book of Psalms
- Hebrew Bible part: Ketuvim
- Order in the Hebrew part: 1
- Category: Sifrei Emet
- Christian Bible part: Old Testament
- Order in the Christian part: 19

Psalm 52 is the 52nd psalm of the Book of Psalms, beginning in English in the King James Version: "Why boastest thou thyself in mischief, O mighty man?". In the slightly different numbering system used in the Greek Septuagint and Latin Vulgate translations of the Bible, this psalm is Psalm 51. In Latin, it is known as "Quid gloriatur in malitia", It is described as a maskil, attributed to David, and is said to have been written "when Doeg the Edomite went and told Saul, and said to him, "David has gone to the house of Ahimelech". In this psalm, David criticises those who use their talents for evil.

The psalm forms a regular part of Jewish, Catholic, Eastern Orthodox and Protestant liturgies.

== Context ==
The psalm's sub-heading refers to the occasion reported in 1 Samuel 21–22 when Doeg, the chief herdsman of Saul, the first king of Israel, informed Saul that David had been received by Ahimelech at Nob, a priestly town in the vicinity of Jerusalem, and assisted with the means for his flight. Alexander Kirkpatrick observes that "the character denounced in the Psalm is in some respects such as we may suppose Doeg to have been. He was a man of wealth and importance as the chief of Saul’s herdmen (or, according to the LXX, the keeper of his mules). His tongue was "a deceitful tongue", because although the facts he reported were true, he helped to confirm Saul in a false and cruel suspicion.

However, Kirkpatrick notes that

the entire absence of any reference to the cold-blooded and sacrilegious murder of the priests at Nob, in which Doeg acted as Saul’s agent, when all his other officers shrank from executing his brutal order, makes it difficult, if not impossible, to suppose that the Psalm was really written by David on that occasion, unless we could assume that it was composed after Doeg’s information was given but before the massacre was perpetrated, which is wholly improbable.

Instead, he argues that

Just sufficient appropriateness may be traced to account for the title having been prefixed by the compiler of this division of the Psalter, or for the Psalm having been connected with the story of Doeg in some historical work from which the compiler took it.

== Latin divisions ==
This psalm opens the second section of the three traditional divisions of the Latin psalter, and for this reason the first words (Quid gloriatur in malitia qui potens est iniquitate...), and above all the initial "Q", were often greatly enlarged in illuminated manuscript psalters, following the pattern of the Beatus initials at the start of Psalm 1, and the "D" of Psalm 102.

== Psalm form ==
According to Hermann Gunkel's system of classification, Psalm 52 was conditionally classified as an Individual Psalm of Trust, one that demonstrates an expression of trust or confidence in YHWH's assistant to the petitioner.

== Book of Common Prayer ==
In the Church of England's Book of Common Prayer, this psalm is appointed to be read on the morning of the tenth day of the month.

== Musical settings ==
Heinrich Schütz wrote a setting of a paraphrase of Psalm 52 in German, "Was trotzst denn du, Tyrann, so hoch", SWV 149, for the Becker Psalter, published first in 1628.

== Text ==
The following table shows the Hebrew text of the Psalm with vowels, alongside the Koine Greek text in the Septuagint and the English translation from the King James Version. Note that the meaning can slightly differ between these versions, as the Septuagint and the Masoretic Text come from different textual traditions. (Note: A 1917 translation directly from Hebrew to English by the Jewish Publication Society can be found here or here, and an 1844 translation directly from the Septuagint by L. C. L. Brenton can be found here. Both translations are in the public domain.) In the Septuagint, this psalm is numbered Psalm 51.

#	Hebrew	English	Greek
(Note: In the Jewish verse numbering, the ascription of this psalm is verses 1 and 2, and the rest of the psalm begins from verse 3. However, the Christian verse numbering does not count the ascription.)	לַמְנַצֵּ֗חַ מַשְׂכִּ֥יל לְדָוִֽד׃	(To the chief Musician, Maschil, A Psalm of David,	Εἰς τὸ τέλος· συνέσεως τῷ Δαυΐδ·
	בְּב֤וֹא ׀ דּוֹאֵ֣ג הָאֲדֹמִי֮ וַיַּגֵּ֢ד לְשָׁ֫א֥וּל וַיֹּ֥אמֶר ל֑וֹ בָּ֥א דָ֝וִ֗ד אֶל־בֵּ֥ית אֲחִימֶֽלֶךְ׃	when Doeg the Edomite came and told Saul, and said unto him, David is come to the house of Ahimelech.)	ἐν τῷ ἐλθεῖν Δωὴκ τὸν ᾿Ιδουμαῖον καὶ ἀναγγεῖλαι τῷ Σαοὺλ καὶ εἰπεῖν αὐτῷ· ἦλθε Δαυΐδ εἰς τὸν οἶκον ᾿Αβιμέλεχ. -
1	מַה־תִּתְהַלֵּ֣ל בְּ֭רָעָה הַגִּבּ֑וֹר חֶ֥סֶד אֵ֝֗ל כׇּל־הַיּֽוֹם׃	Why boastest thou thyself in mischief, O mighty man? the goodness of God endureth continually.	ΤΙ ΕΓΚΑΥΧᾼ ἐν κακίᾳ, ὁ δυνατός, ἀνομίαν ὅλην τὴν ἡμέραν;
2	הַ֭וּוֹת תַּחְשֹׁ֣ב לְשׁוֹנֶ֑ךָ כְּתַ֥עַר מְ֝לֻטָּ֗שׁ עֹשֵׂ֥ה רְמִיָּֽה׃	Thy tongue deviseth mischiefs; like a sharp razor, working deceitfully.	ἀδικίαν ἐλογίσατο ἡ γλῶσσά σου· ὡσεὶ ξυρὸν ἠκονημένον ἐποίησας δόλον.
3	אָהַ֣בְתָּ רָּ֣ע מִטּ֑וֹב שֶׁ֓קֶר ׀ מִדַּבֵּ֖ר צֶ֣דֶק סֶֽלָה׃	Thou lovest evil more than good; and lying rather than to speak righteousness. Selah.	ἠγάπησας κακίαν ὑπὲρ ἀγαθωσύνην, ἀδικίαν ὑπὲρ τὸ λαλῆσαι δικαιοσύνην. (διάψαλμα).
4	אָהַ֥בְתָּ כׇֽל־דִּבְרֵי־בָ֗לַע לְשׁ֣וֹן מִרְמָֽה׃	Thou lovest all devouring words, O thou deceitful tongue.	ἠγάπησας πάντα τὰ ῥήματα καταποντισμοῦ, γλῶσσαν δολίαν.
5	גַּם־אֵל֮ יִתׇּצְךָ֢ לָ֫נֶ֥צַח יַחְתְּךָ֣ וְיִסָּחֲךָ֣ מֵאֹ֑הֶל וְשֵׁרֶשְׁךָ֨ מֵאֶ֖רֶץ חַיִּ֣ים סֶֽלָה׃	God shall likewise destroy thee for ever, he shall take thee away, and pluck thee out of thy dwelling place, and root thee out of the land of the living. Selah.	διὰ τοῦτο ὁ Θεὸς καθέλοι σε εἰς τέλος· ἐκτίλαι σε καὶ μεταναστεύσαι σε ἀπὸ σκηνώματός σου καὶ τὸ ρίζωμά σου ἐκ γῆς ζώντων. (διάψαλμα).
6	וְיִרְא֖וּ צַדִּיקִ֥ים וְיִירָ֗אוּ וְעָלָ֥יו יִשְׂחָֽקוּ׃	The righteous also shall see, and fear, and shall laugh at him:	ὄψονται δίκαιοι καὶ φοβηθήσονται καὶ ἐπ᾿ αὐτὸν γελάσονται καὶ ἐροῦσιν·
7	הִנֵּ֤ה הַגֶּ֗בֶר לֹ֤א יָשִׂ֥ים אֱלֹהִ֗ים מָ֫עוּזּ֥וֹ וַ֭יִּבְטַח בְּרֹ֣ב עׇשְׁר֑וֹ יָ֝עֹ֗ז בְּהַוָּתֽוֹ׃	Lo, this is the man that made not God his strength; but trusted in the abundance of his riches, and strengthened himself in his wickedness.	ἰδοὺ ἄνθρωπος, ὃς οὐκ ἔθετο τὸν Θεὸν βοηθὸν αὐτοῦ, ἀλλ᾿ ἐπήλπισεν ἐπὶ τὸ πλῆθος τοῦ πλούτου αὐτοῦ καὶ ἐνεδυναμώθη ἐπὶ τῇ ματαιότητι αὐτοῦ.
8	וַאֲנִ֤י ׀ כְּזַ֣יִת רַ֭עֲנָן בְּבֵ֣ית אֱלֹהִ֑ים בָּטַ֥חְתִּי בְחֶסֶד־אֱ֝לֹהִ֗ים עוֹלָ֥ם וָעֶֽד׃	But I am like a green olive tree in the house of God: I trust in the mercy of God for ever and ever.	ἐγὼ δὲ ὡσεὶ ἐλαία κατάκαρπος ἐν τῷ οἴκῳ τοῦ Θεοῦ· ἤλπισα ἐπὶ τὸ ἔλεος τοῦ Θεοῦ εἰς τὸν αἰῶνα καὶ εἰς τὸν αἰῶνα τοῦ αἰῶνος.
9	אוֹדְךָ֣ לְ֭עוֹלָם כִּ֣י עָשִׂ֑יתָ וַאֲקַוֶּ֥ה שִׁמְךָ֥ כִי־ט֝֗וֹב נֶ֣גֶד חֲסִידֶֽיךָ׃	I will praise thee for ever, because thou hast done it: and I will wait on thy name; for it is good before thy saints.	ἐξομολογήσομαί σοι εἰς τὸν αἰῶνα, ὅτι ἐποίησας, καὶ ὑπομενῶ τὸ ὄνομά σου, ὅτι χρηστὸν ἐναντίον τῶν ὁσίων σου.
