= Achimelech =

Achimelech may refer to:

- Ahimelech, the priest of Nob who extended hospitality to David during his flight from the court of Saul. As reported to King Saul by Doeg the Edomite, Ahimelech gave David five loaves of holy bread, the sword of Goliath, and, though reputed to have consulted God for David by Doeg, this was simply propaganda against the priests of Nob. For this he was put to death personally by Doeg, together with all the priests of Nob, except Abiathar, his son, who escaped and joined David (I Samuel 21–22).
- Achimelech, a Hittite, companion of the outlawed David (1 Samuel 26:6).
- There is an Achimelech spoken of (2 Samuel 8:17, and 1 Chronicles 18:16; 24:3, 6, 31), as a "son of Abiathar" and an associate of Zadok in the priesthood. As this position is usually attributed to "Abiathar, son of Achimelech" it is thought that the reading "Achimelech, son of Abiathar" is due to an accidental transposition of the text of Kings, and that this transposition has affected the text of Paralipomenon.
- Achimelech, a name given to Achish, King of Gath, in the title of Psalm 33. Some texts have Abimelech.
