= 1 Samuel 24 =

First Book of Samuel chapter

- ← chapter 23 chapter 25 →
- The pages containing the Books of Samuel (1 & 2 Samuel) in Leningrad Codex (1008 CE).
- Book: First book of Samuel
- Hebrew Bible part: Nevi'im
- Order in the Hebrew part: 3
- Category: Former Prophets
- Christian Bible part: Old Testament
- Order in the Christian part: 9

1 Samuel 24 is the twenty-fourth chapter of the First Book of Samuel in the Old Testament of the Christian Bible or the first part of the Books of Samuel in the Hebrew Bible. Jewish tradition attributes the book to the prophet Samuel, with later additions by the prophets Gad and Nathan; modern scholarship, however, regards it as a compilation of independent texts dated to c. 630–540 BCE. This chapter contains the account of David's escape from Saul's repeated attempts to kill him. This is within a section comprising 1 Samuel 16 to 2 Samuel 5 which records the rise of David as the king of Israel.

== Text ==
This chapter was originally written in Biblical Hebrew. It is divided into 22 verses.

=== Textual witnesses ===
Some early manuscripts containing the text of this chapter in Hebrew are of the Masoretic Textual tradition, which includes the Codex Cairensis (895), Aleppo Codex (10th century), and Codex Leningradensis (1008). Fragments containing parts of this chapter in Hebrew were found among the Dead Sea Scrolls including 4Q51 (4QSam^{a}; 100–50 BCE) with extant verses 3–5, 8–10, 14–23.

Extant ancient manuscripts of a translation into Koine Greek known as the Septuagint (originally was made in the last few centuries BCE) include Codex Vaticanus (B; $\mathfrak{G}$^{B}; 4th century) and Codex Alexandrinus (A; $\mathfrak{G}$^{A}; 5th century). (Note: The whole book of 1 Samuel is missing from the extant Codex Sinaiticus.)

== Places ==
Places mentioned in this chapter
- Engedi

== David spared Saul (24:1–15) ==
The section beginning with chapter 24:1 (1 Samuel 23:29 in the Christian numbering) reports David's move to En-gedi in the hilly area around the Dead Sea, while Saul, returning from a battle with the Philistines, was pursuing. The section emphasizes two points:

1. David could have easily killed Saul and thereby seized the kingship.
2. He resisted the temptation to kill God's mashiach (Biblical Hebrew: מָשִׁיחַ, romanized: māšîaḥ, lit. 'anointed one'), and even prevented his men from harming Saul (verses 7–8). David elaborated in his speech (verses 9–16) that instead of taking vengeance on Saul for "treating him like an insignificant dog or flea", he duly acknowledged Saul's position as a God-chosen king (verse 9) while entrusted vengeance to God (verse 13). Another similar account of sparing Saul's life is found in 1 Samuel 26.

=== Verse 3 ===
And he came to the sheepcotes by the way, where was a cave; and Saul went in to cover his feet: and David and his men remained in the sides of the cave.

- "Sheepcotes" or "sheepfolds" (גִּדְרוֹת הַצֹּאן, gidrōt haṣ-ṣōn, 'enclosures of the flock'): simple walled enclosures into which sheep are driven at night to protect them from robbers or wild beasts. Sheepfolds could be in the form of caves during the winter.
- "Cover his feet" (לְהָסֵךְ אֶת־רַגְלָיו, lehāsēkh ʾet-raglāv): an idiom (or euphemism) for relieving oneself.

== David’s oath to Saul (24:16–22) ==
This section contrasts David's uprightness in submitting to the will of God and refraining from taking matters into his own hands with Saul's pitiful figure. All three parts of Saul's speech reflect his weak position:

- Saul conceded that his actions had been evil and that David was more righteous than he (verse 17).
- Saul acknowledged that David would become king. (Note: As reported by Jonathan to David at Horesh in 1 Samuel 23:17.)
- Saul pleaded with David to safeguard his reputation and ensure his descendants' safety, echoing Jonathan's agreement with David regarding the house of Saul in 1 Samuel 20:14–15.

=== Verse 23 ===
David swore to Saul, Saul went home, and David and his men went up to the strongholds.

Typically, succeeding monarchs of a new dynasty would slaughter the descendants of the previous king to eliminate rivals. However, David vowed not to destroy Saul's lineage and kept this promise through his treatment of Mephibosheth, Jonathan's son and Saul's grandson. When Saul returned home, David, understanding Saul's duplicitous nature, wisely chose not to pursue him but instead stayed a fugitive in the wilderness.

== See also ==
- Abiathar
- Anointing
- Ephod
- Israel
- Jonathan
- Philistines
- Saul
- Tribe of Benjamin
- Related Bible parts: 1 Samuel 20, 1 Samuel 21, 1 Samuel 22, 1 Samuel 23

== Sources ==
=== Commentaries on Samuel ===
- Auld, Graeme (2003). "1 & 2 Samuel". In James D. G. Dunn and John William Rogerson (ed.). Eerdmans Commentary on the Bible. Eerdmans. ISBN 9780802837110.
- Bergen, David T. (1996). 1, 2 Samuel. B&H Publishing Group. ISBN 9780805401073.
- Chapman, Stephen B. (2016). 1 Samuel as Christian Scripture: A Theological Commentary. Wm. B. Eerdmans Publishing Company. ISBN 978-1467445160.
- Evans, Paul (2018). Longman, Tremper (ed.). 1-2 Samuel. The Story of God Bible Commentary. Zondervan Academic. ISBN 978-0310490944.
- Gordon, Robert (1986). I & II Samuel, A Commentary. Paternoster Press. ISBN 9780310230229.
- Hertzberg, Hans Wilhelm (1964). I & II Samuel, A Commentary (trans. from German 2nd edition 1960 ed.). Westminster John Knox Press. p. 19. ISBN 978-0664223182.
- Tsumura, David Toshio (2007). The First Book of Samuel. Eerdmans. ISBN 9780802823595.

=== General ===
- Breytenbach, Andries (2000). "Who Is Behind The Samuel Narrative?". In Johannes Cornelis de Moor and H.F. Van Rooy (ed.). Past, Present, Future: the Deuteronomistic History and the Prophets. Brill. ISBN 9789004118713.
- Coogan, Michael David (2007). Coogan, Michael David; Brettler, Marc Zvi; Newsom, Carol Ann; Perkins, Pheme (eds.). The New Oxford Annotated Bible with the Apocryphal/Deuterocanonical Books: New Revised Standard Version, Issue 48 (Augmented 3rd ed.). Oxford University Press. ISBN 978-0195288810.
- Fitzmyer, Joseph A. (2008). A Guide to the Dead Sea Scrolls and Related Literature. Grand Rapids, MI: William B. Eerdmans Publishing Company. ISBN 9780802862419.
- Halley, Henry H. (1965). Halley's Bible Handbook: an abbreviated Bible commentary (24th (revised) ed.). Zondervan Publishing House. ISBN 0-310-25720-4.
- Hayes, Christine (2015). Introduction to the Bible. Yale University Press. ISBN 978-0300188271.
- Jones, Gwilym H. (2007). "12. 1 and 2 Samuel". In Barton, John; Muddiman, John (eds.). The Oxford Bible Commentary (first (paperback) ed.). Oxford University Press. pp. 196–232. ISBN 978-0199277186.
- Klein, R.W. (2003). "Samuel, books of". In Bromiley, Geoffrey W (ed.). The International Standard Bible Encyclopedia. Eerdmans. ISBN 9780802837844.
- Knight, Douglas A (1995). "Chapter 4 Deuteronomy and the Deuteronomists". In James Luther Mays, David L. Petersen and Kent Harold Richards (ed.). Old Testament Interpretation. T&T Clark. ISBN 9780567292896.
- Ulrich, Eugene, ed. (2010). The Biblical Qumran Scrolls: Transcriptions and Textual Variants. Brill.
- Würthwein, Ernst (1995). The Text of the Old Testament. Translated by Rhodes, Erroll F. Grand Rapids, MI: Wm. B. Eerdmans. ISBN 0-8028-0788-7.
