= Abimelech (disambiguation) =

Abimelech was the Philistine king met by Abraham in the Book of Genesis, one of many Philistine kings by that name.

Abimelech may also refer to:

- Abimelech (Judges), son of Gideon and Leader of Israel in the Book of Judges
- Achish, son of Maoch and King of Gath, who is called Abimelech in Psalm 34
- Abimelech (oratorio), first performed in 1768 and describing events in the Book of Genesis

== See also ==
- Abimelec Ortiz (born 2002), Puerto Rican baseball player
- Achimelech
- Avimelekh, Russian male first name
