= 1 Samuel 26 =

First Book of Samuel chapter

- ← chapter 25 chapter 27 →
- The pages containing the Books of Samuel (1 & 2 Samuel) in Leningrad Codex (1008 CE).
- Book: First book of Samuel
- Hebrew Bible part: Nevi'im
- Order in the Hebrew part: 3
- Category: Former Prophets
- Christian Bible part: Old Testament
- Order in the Christian part: 9

1 Samuel 26 is the twenty-sixth chapter of the First Book of Samuel in the Old Testament of the Christian Bible or the first part of the Books of Samuel in the Hebrew Bible. Jewish tradition attributes the book to the prophet Samuel, with later additions by the prophets Gad and Nathan; modern scholarship, however, regards it as a compilation of independent texts dated to c. 630–540 BCE. This chapter contains the account of David's escape from Saul's repeated attempts to kill him, being within a section comprising 1 Samuel 16 to 2 Samuel 5 that records the rise of David as the king of Israel.

== Text ==
This chapter was originally written in the Hebrew language. It is divided into 25 verses.

=== Textual witnesses ===
Some early manuscripts containing the text of this chapter in Hebrew are of the Masoretic Text tradition, which includes the Codex Cairensis (895), Aleppo Codex (10th century), and Codex Leningradensis (1008). Fragments containing parts of this chapter in Hebrew were found among the Dead Sea Scrolls including 4Q51 (4QSam^{a}; 100–50 BCE) with extant verses 9–12, 21–24.

Extant ancient manuscripts of a translation into Koine Greek known as the Septuagint (originally was made in the last few centuries BCE) include Codex Vaticanus (B; $\mathfrak{G}$^{B}; 4th century) and Codex Alexandrinus (A; $\mathfrak{G}$^{A}; 5th century). (Note: The whole book of 1 Samuel is missing from the extant Codex Sinaiticus.)

== Places ==
Places mentioned in this chapter
- Gibeah
- Hachilah

== David spares Saul again (26:1–12) ==
There are many similarities between this narrative and those in 1 Samuel 23:19–24 and 1 Samuel 24:1–22, although the differences show that these are two separate events. Several biblical translations include the word "again" in their chapter subheadings for added clarity.

Points of similarity between 26:1–12 and passages in chapters 23:19–24 and 24:1–22 include:

1. The report of the Ziphites.
2. David's camp on the hill of Hachilah (Biblical Hebrew: חֲכִילָה, romanized: ḥăḵîlāh).
3. Saul's march with 3000 men.
4. The urge of David's men to kill Saul.
5. David's refusal to kill the anointed of Jehovah.
6. Saul's recognition of David's voice.
7. David's comparison of himself to a flea.

Points of difference:

1. David spared Saul's life in a cave at En-gedi; in this chapter, in Saul's entrenched camp.
2. Earlier, David had to flee in haste; here he could send spies.
3. Previously, David was saved by the news of the Philistines' invasion; here, David kept a distance and was separated by a ravine.
4. In the first event, David cut off a piece of Saul's cloak, whereas here he took away Saul's spear (a symbol of royal office) and water jug (a symbol of life) while Saul was fast asleep in the camp.

=== Verse 1 ===
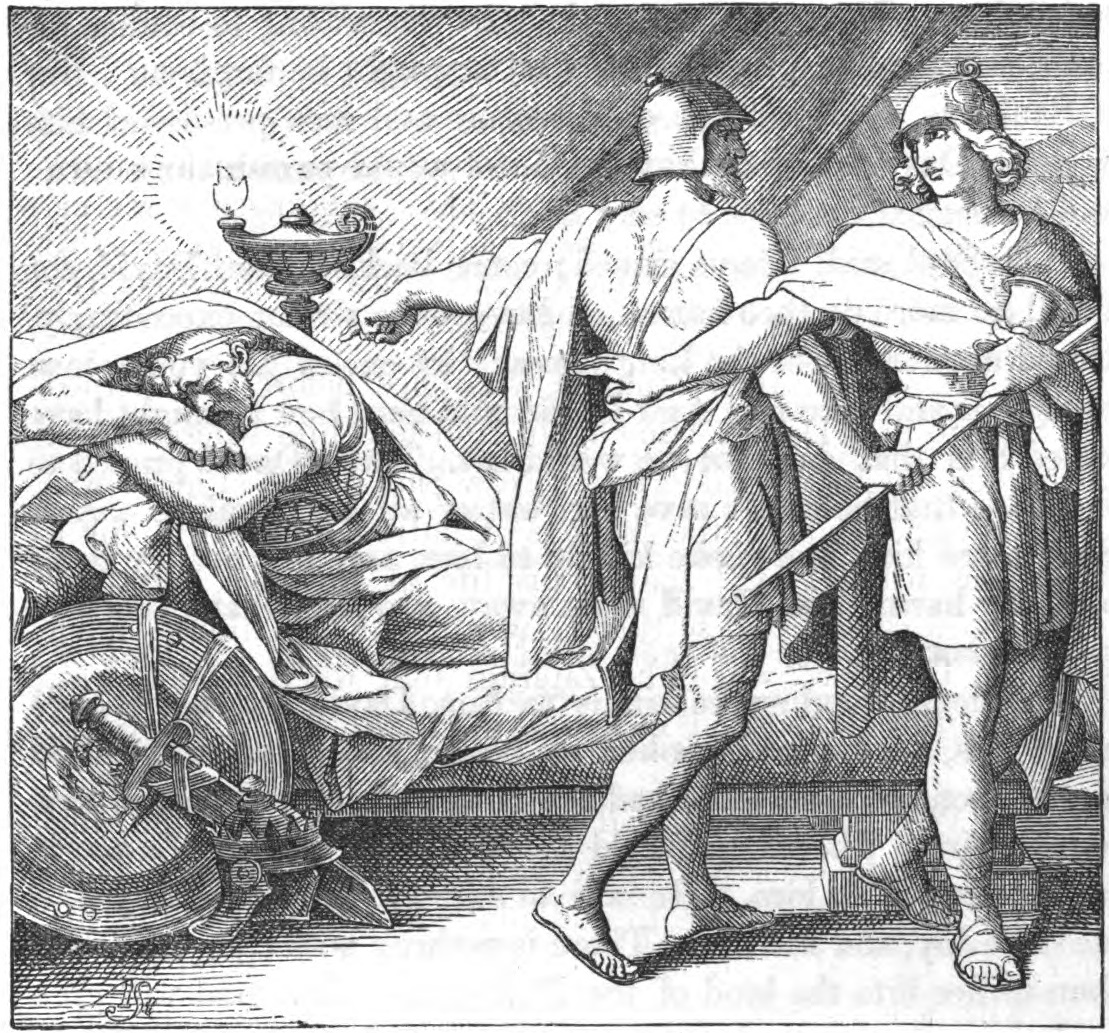
An 1873 illustration of Abishai (center) encouraging David (right) to strike Saul.

Now the Ziphites came to Saul at Gibeah, saying, "Is David not hiding in the hill of Hachilah, opposite Jeshimon (Note: יְשִׁימוֹן, yĕšîmôn)?"

David's return to Maon (מָעוֹן, māʿôn) could be connected with some business of Abigail, now David's wife, who may still have controlled some properties in the area. The Ziphites reported David's presence to Saul, probably out of fear that David may attack them for their former betrayal of him. The fact that Saul at that time was in Gibeah and only "arose" after hearing the report suggests that he did not pursue David any more until being excited by the Ziphites about a good opportunity to ambush David. The Biblical Hebrew word Jeshimon is sometimes translated as "the badlands".

== David reproved Abner as Saul acknowledged his sin against David (26:13–25) ==
After departing from Saul's camp without detection and maintaining a safe distance, David reproached Abner for his failure to safeguard the king, while also insinuating an inability to recognize the king-elect (verse 14). Nevertheless, Saul identified David's voice and lamented his decision to pursue him. Considering his choice to vacate Israelite territory, David appealed to Saul not to permit his blood "to fall to the earth" while in exile (verse 20). Ultimately, this marked the final encounter between Saul and David. As they parted ways permanently, Saul offered his final blessings to David.

=== Verse 20 ===
"Now therefore, let not my blood fall to the earth away from the presence of the LORD, for the king of Israel has come out to seek a single flea like one who hunts a partridge in the mountains."

- "Away in the presence of the LORD": David implied that he would not be able to properly worship God if he left the land of Israel (אֶרֶץ יִשְׂרָאֵל, ʾereṣ Yiśrāʾēl), which he was planning to do.

== See also ==
- Abishai
- Abner
- Ahimelech
- Anointing
- Biblical Hittites
- Espionage
- Joab
- Israel
- Ner
- Zeruiah
- Related Bible parts: 1 Samuel 24, 1 Samuel 25

== Sources ==
=== Commentaries on Samuel ===
- Auld, Graeme (2003). "1 & 2 Samuel". In James D. G. Dunn and John William Rogerson (ed.). Eerdmans Commentary on the Bible. Eerdmans. ISBN 9780802837110.
- Bergen, David T. (1996). 1, 2 Samuel. B&H Publishing Group. ISBN 9780805401073.
- Chapman, Stephen B. (2016). 1 Samuel as Christian Scripture: A Theological Commentary. Wm. B. Eerdmans Publishing Company. ISBN 978-1467445160.
- Evans, Paul (2018). Longman, Tremper (ed.). 1-2 Samuel. The Story of God Bible Commentary. Zondervan Academic. ISBN 978-0310490944.
- Gordon, Robert (1986). I & II Samuel, A Commentary. Paternoster Press. ISBN 9780310230229.
- Hertzberg, Hans Wilhelm (1964). I & II Samuel, A Commentary (trans. from German 2nd edition 1960 ed.). Westminster John Knox Press. p. 19. ISBN 978-0664223182.
- Tsumura, David Toshio (2007). The First Book of Samuel. Eerdmans. ISBN 9780802823595.

=== General ===
- Breytenbach, Andries (2000). "Who Is Behind The Samuel Narrative?". In Johannes Cornelis de Moor and H.F. Van Rooy (ed.). Past, Present, Future: the Deuteronomistic History and the Prophets. Brill. ISBN 9789004118713.
- Coogan, Michael David (2007). Coogan, Michael David; Brettler, Marc Zvi; Newsom, Carol Ann; Perkins, Pheme (eds.). The New Oxford Annotated Bible with the Apocryphal/Deuterocanonical Books: New Revised Standard Version, Issue 48 (Augmented 3rd ed.). Oxford University Press. ISBN 978-0195288810.
- Fitzmyer, Joseph A. (2008). A Guide to the Dead Sea Scrolls and Related Literature. Grand Rapids, MI: William B. Eerdmans Publishing Company. ISBN 9780802862419.
- Halley, Henry H. (1965). Halley's Bible Handbook: an abbreviated Bible commentary (24th (revised) ed.). Zondervan Publishing House. ISBN 0-310-25720-4.
- Hayes, Christine (2015). Introduction to the Bible. Yale University Press. ISBN 978-0300188271.
- Jones, Gwilym H. (2007). "12. 1 and 2 Samuel". In Barton, John; Muddiman, John (eds.). The Oxford Bible Commentary (first (paperback) ed.). Oxford University Press. pp. 196–232. ISBN 978-0199277186.
- Klein, R.W. (2003). "Samuel, books of". In Bromiley, Geoffrey W (ed.). The International Standard Bible Encyclopedia. Eerdmans. ISBN 9780802837844.
- Knight, Douglas A (1995). "Chapter 4 Deuteronomy and the Deuteronomists". In James Luther Mays, David L. Petersen and Kent Harold Richards (ed.). Old Testament Interpretation. T&T Clark. ISBN 9780567292896.
- Ulrich, Eugene, ed. (2010). The Biblical Qumran Scrolls: Transcriptions and Textual Variants. Brill.
- Würthwein, Ernst (1995). The Text of the Old Testament. Translated by Rhodes, Erroll F. Grand Rapids, MI: Wm. B. Eerdmans. ISBN 0-8028-0788-7.
