= 1 Samuel 23 =

First Book of Samuel chapter

- ← chapter 22 chapter 24 →
- The pages containing the Books of Samuel (1 & 2 Samuel) in Leningrad Codex (1008 CE).
- Book: First book of Samuel
- Hebrew Bible part: Nevi'im
- Order in the Hebrew part: 3
- Category: Former Prophets
- Christian Bible part: Old Testament
- Order in the Christian part: 9

1 Samuel 23 is the twenty-third chapter of the First Book of Samuel in the Old Testament of the Christian Bible or the first part of the Books of Samuel in the Hebrew Bible. Jewish tradition attributes the book to the prophet Samuel, with later additions by the prophets Gad and Nathan; modern scholarship, however, regards it as a compilation of independent texts dated to c. 630–540 BCE. This chapter contains the account of David's escape from Saul's repeated attempts to kill him. This is within a section comprising 1 Samuel 16 to 2 Samuel 5 which records the rise of David as the king of Israel.

== Text ==
This chapter was originally written in Biblical Hebrew, and it is divided into 29 verses.

=== Textual witnesses ===
Some early manuscripts containing the text of this chapter in Biblical Hebrew are of the Masoretic Textual tradition, which includes the Codex Cairensis (895), Aleppo Codex (10th century), and Codex Leningradensis (1008). Fragments containing parts of this chapter in Hebrew were found among the Dead Sea Scrolls including 4Q52 (4QSam^{b}; 250 BCE) with extant verses 8–23.

Extant ancient manuscripts of a translation into Koine Greek known as the Septuagint (originally composed made in the last few centuries BCE) include Codex Vaticanus (B; $\mathfrak{G}$^{B}; 4th century) and Codex Alexandrinus (A; $\mathfrak{G}$^{A}; 5th century). (Note: The whole book of 1 Samuel is missing from the extant Codex Sinaiticus.)

== Places ==
Places mentioned in this chapter

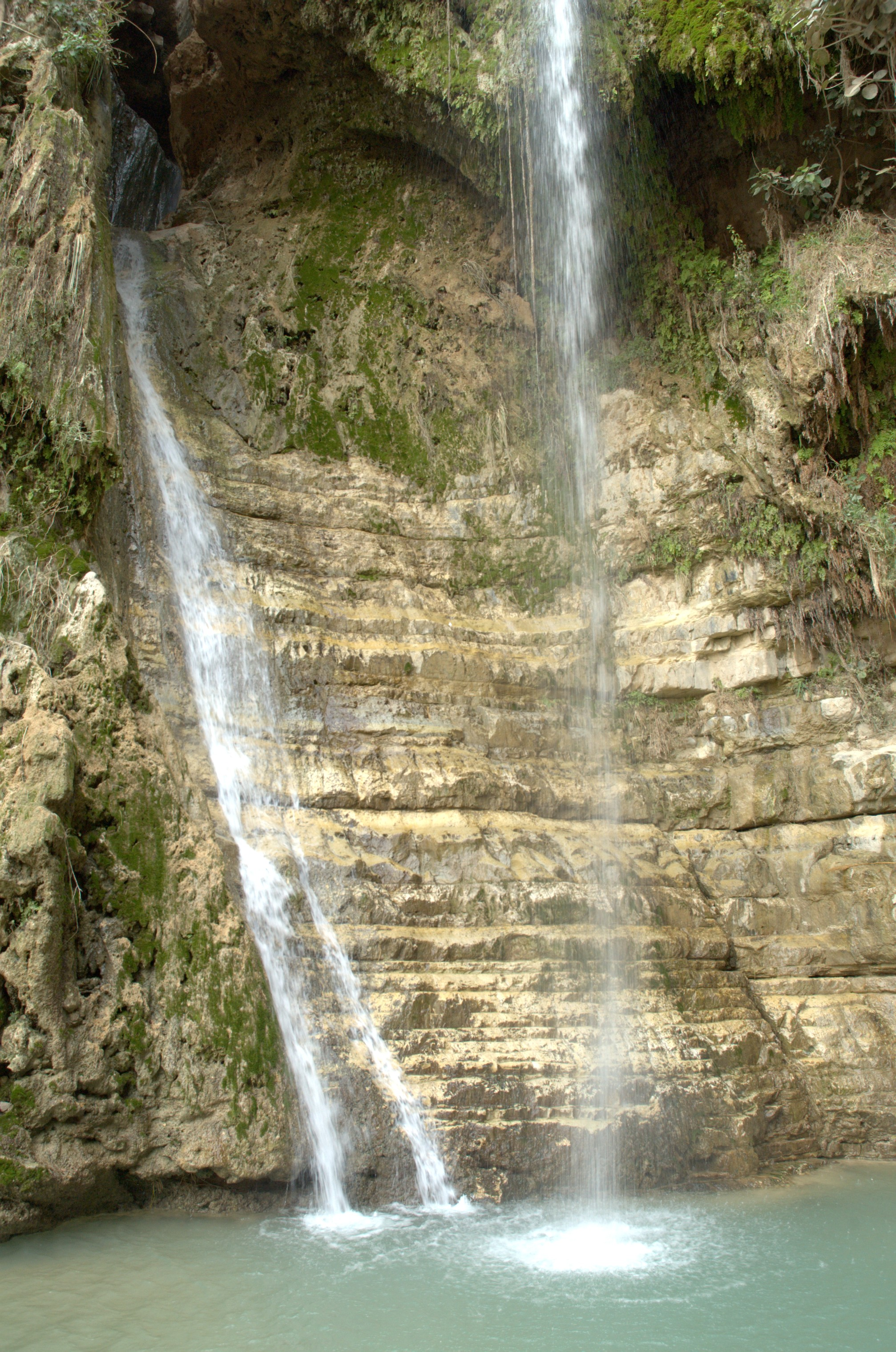
David falls, Ein Gedi.

- Engedi
- Gibeah
- Hachilah
- Keilah

== David saved the city of Keilah (23:1–13) ==
The narrative describes how David acted as a good king, protecting Israel's territory from a foreign aggressor even while on the run from the reigning king, Saul. At this time, David was shown to have access to YHWH through an oracle (before the arrival of Abiathar and the ephod), so he inquired of YHWH twice—once on his own initiative and a second time to calm his men's uncertainty—because David received an encouraging response and an assurance of divine involvement (verse 5). David's next inquiry to YHWH, through Abiathar and the ephod after liberating Keilah (verse 6), was twofold: "Will Saul come to Keilah?" and "Will the inhabitants betray him?" Both questions were asked with an affirmative reply in mind. David and his men immediately left the city, thwarting Saul's plan to capture David easily in a closed-in town such as Keilah. (Saul delusionally believed that God had "given him" into his hand, following the Greek and Targum Jonathan, in preference to the Masoretic Text, which renders it "made a stranger of him".) Saul mustered a big army as he did before, but instead of directing it against foreign attackers, he misused "the armies of the living God" (17:26) for his own purpose (i.e., to capture David). However, it is clear in the narrative that David had an advantage over Saul: David had access to YHWH, whereas Saul did not (1 Samuel 14:37).

=== Verse 1 ===
Then they told David, saying, "Look, the Philistines are fighting against Keilah, and they are robbing the threshing floors."

- "Keilah": designated as a city of the Tribe of Judah in Joshua 15:44, it was not far from the Philistines' territory, (Note: "In the recesses of the Philistines" in verse 3 of the Septuagint instead of "against the armies of the Philistines" in the Christian New Revised Standard Version.) so it was of interest to both the Israelites and the Philistines.

== David in wilderness strongholds (23:14–29) ==
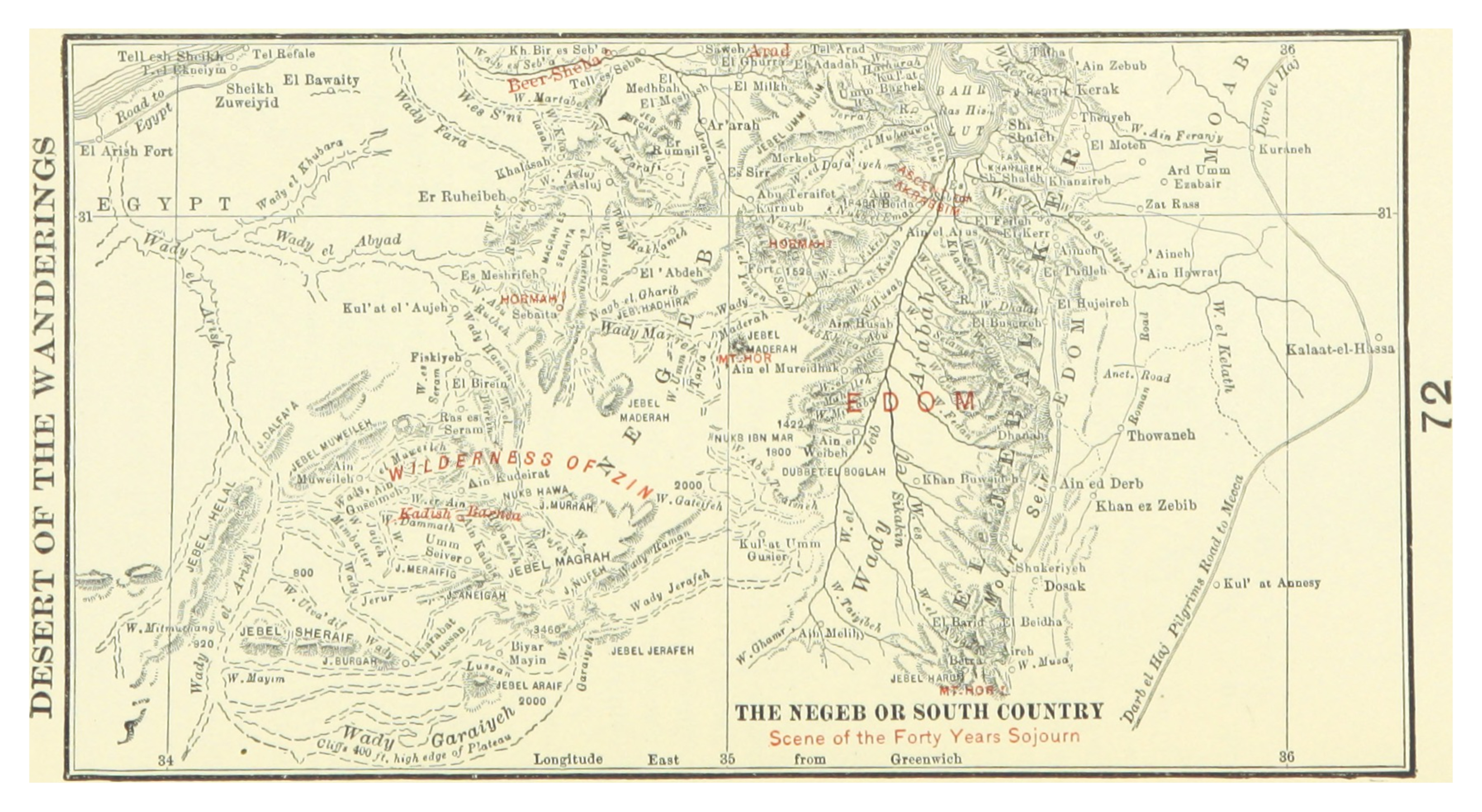
"Desert of the wanderings". Image from The Holy Land in Geography and in History [with maps and plans], by Maccoun, Townsend (1899)

David left Keilah with six hundred soldiers (up from 400 people in 1 Samuel 22) to move from place to place, avoiding Saul's pursuit. When David was in Ziph, which was on the edge of the Judaean Desert, Jonathan met him to reaffirm the pact between them that Jonathan was content with being second to David, so now David has the priesthood and the house of Saul behind him. However, as verses 19–23 show, David was still in constant danger, as the local people where he stayed with (the Ziphites) were willing to deliver him into Saul's hands and provided the necessary information. Although David was acknowledged by Saul as "cunning" in escaping, he was eventually cornered when reaching "the wilderness of Maon" (verse 24), southwards of Hebron, as Saul and his troops were "closing in" on him from both sides. David was saved when Saul, informed of a Philistine attack he had to face as king of Israel, abandoned his plan to capture David.

=== Verse 28 ===
Therefore Saul returned from pursuing David, and went against the Philistines; so they called that place the Rock of Escape.

- "Rock of Escape" (סֶלַע הַמַּחְלְקוֹת, selāʿ ha‑maḥlĕqōt, 'rock [of] the separation'): possibly denoting that Saul and David parted company at that place.

== See also ==
- Abiathar
- Ahimelech
- Ahitub
- Ephod
- Herder
- Jesse
- Jonathan
- Kohen
- Philistines
- Saul
- Tribe of Benjamin
- Related Bible parts: 1 Samuel 20, 1 Samuel 21, 1 Samuel 22

== Sources ==
=== Commentaries on Samuel ===
- Auld, Graeme (2003). "1 & 2 Samuel". In James D. G. Dunn and John William Rogerson (ed.). Eerdmans Commentary on the Bible. Eerdmans. ISBN 9780802837110.
- Bergen, David T. (1996). 1, 2 Samuel. B&H Publishing Group. ISBN 9780805401073.
- Chapman, Stephen B. (2016). 1 Samuel as Christian Scripture: A Theological Commentary. Wm. B. Eerdmans Publishing Company. ISBN 978-1467445160.
- Evans, Paul (2018). Longman, Tremper (ed.). 1-2 Samuel. The Story of God Bible Commentary. Zondervan Academic. ISBN 978-0310490944.
- Gordon, Robert (1986). I & II Samuel, A Commentary. Paternoster Press. ISBN 9780310230229.
- Hertzberg, Hans Wilhelm (1964). I & II Samuel, A Commentary (trans. from German 2nd edition 1960 ed.). Westminster John Knox Press. p. 19. ISBN 978-0664223182.
- Tsumura, David Toshio (2007). The First Book of Samuel. Eerdmans. ISBN 9780802823595.

=== General ===
- Breytenbach, Andries (2000). "Who Is Behind The Samuel Narrative?". In Johannes Cornelis de Moor and H.F. Van Rooy (ed.). Past, Present, Future: the Deuteronomistic History and the Prophets. Brill. ISBN 9789004118713.
- Coogan, Michael David (2007). Coogan, Michael David; Brettler, Marc Zvi; Newsom, Carol Ann; Perkins, Pheme (eds.). The New Oxford Annotated Bible with the Apocryphal/Deuterocanonical Books: New Revised Standard Version, Issue 48 (Augmented 3rd ed.). Oxford University Press. ISBN 978-0195288810.
- Fitzmyer, Joseph A. (2008). A Guide to the Dead Sea Scrolls and Related Literature. Grand Rapids, MI: William B. Eerdmans Publishing Company. ISBN 9780802862419.
- Halley, Henry H. (1965). Halley's Bible Handbook: an abbreviated Bible commentary (24th (revised) ed.). Zondervan Publishing House. ISBN 0-310-25720-4.
- Hayes, Christine (2015). Introduction to the Bible. Yale University Press. ISBN 978-0300188271.
- Jones, Gwilym H. (2007). "12. 1 and 2 Samuel". In Barton, John; Muddiman, John (eds.). The Oxford Bible Commentary (first (paperback) ed.). Oxford University Press. pp. 196–232. ISBN 978-0199277186.
- Klein, R.W. (2003). "Samuel, books of". In Bromiley, Geoffrey W (ed.). The International Standard Bible Encyclopedia. Eerdmans. ISBN 9780802837844.
- Knight, Douglas A (1995). "Chapter 4 Deuteronomy and the Deuteronomists". In James Luther Mays, David L. Petersen and Kent Harold Richards (ed.). Old Testament Interpretation. T&T Clark. ISBN 9780567292896.
- Ulrich, Eugene, ed. (2010). The Biblical Qumran Scrolls: Transcriptions and Textual Variants. Brill.
- Würthwein, Ernst (1995). The Text of the Old Testament. Translated by Rhodes, Erroll F. Grand Rapids, MI: Wm. B. Eerdmans. ISBN 0-8028-0788-7.
