= Covering of the eyes =

The phrase "covering of eyes" is found in Genesis 20:16. It is translated literally in Young's Literal Translation. The King James Version inserts the definite article "the", absent in the original text. Almost all other versions treat it as a figurative expression, and translate it according to the meaning, not the individual words.

== The verse ==
The verse appears when king Abimelech of Gerar is speaking to Abraham and his wife Sarah whom he had taken as his wife thinking her Abraham's sister:

וּלְשָׂרָה אָמַר, הִנֵּה נָתַתִּי אֶלֶף כֶּסֶף לְאָחִיךְ--הִנֵּה הוּא-לָךְ כְּסוּת עֵינַיִם, לְכֹל אֲשֶׁר אִתָּךְ; וְאֵת כֹּל, וְנֹכָחַת.

The King James Version translates as follows:

And unto Sarah he said, Behold, I have given thy brother a thousand pieces of silver: behold, he is to thee a covering of the eyes, unto all that are with thee, and with all other: thus she was reproved.

One commentator has interpreted the phrase as implied advice to Sarah to conform to a supposed custom of married women, and wear a complete veil, covering the eyes as well as the rest of the face, but the phrase is generally taken to refer not to Sarah's eyes, but to the eyes of others, and to be merely a metaphorical expression concerning vindication of Sarah (NASB, RSV), silencing criticism (GWT), allaying suspicions (NJB), righting a wrong (BBE, NLT), covering or recompensing the problem caused her (NIV, NLV, TNIV, JB), a sign of her innocence (ESV, CEV, HCSB). The final phrase in the verse, which KJV takes to mean "she was reproved", is taken by almost all other versions to mean instead "she was vindicated", and the word "הוא", which KJV interprets as "he" (Abraham), is interpreted as "it" (the money).

Abimelech's statement to Sarah about the giving of 1000 pieces of silver is interpreted in the midrash, and sometimes elsewhere, as a curse and re-translated "... his eyes", in order to interpret it as the reason for Isaac's later blindness in his old age. Such a curse was seen as righteously carried out, since Abraham's deliberate deceit was to blame for Abimelech's innocent error, and hence its visitation on Abraham's son was considered just. More modern critical readings view it simply as an instruction to purchase a veil for Sarah, so that she would be clearly identified as being married, in which case it forms a sly reproach against her for not already wearing one.

The Jewish Encyclopedia agreeing with the general view, namely that the phrase has nothing to do with a material veil, states that Abimelech wants his wrongdoing overlooked in exchange for silver in a kind of ransom (kofer-nefesh, similar to the Teutonic Weregild).

=== Current usage ===
In some Arabic countries, Ghitaa' al-'Ain (Arabic:غطاء العین) is a veil which covers the eyes, as well as the rest of the face. This kind of veil was traditionally worn by married Muslim women in the Middle Ages. Some Salafi women in the Arab countries of the Persian Gulf such as Saudi Arabia, Yemen, Qatar, Bahrain, Oman and UAE and parts of Iran may still continue to wear eye-veils, but even in those countries this practice is no longer widespread.

Salafiyyah is the only Islamic school of thought and jurisprudence that believes that a woman's awrah in front of unrelated men is her entire body including her face and hands. In 2008, the religious authority in Mecca, Mohammad Habadan called on women to wear veils that reveal only one eye, so that women would not be encouraged to use eye make-up.

== See also ==
- Niqab
- Purdah
