= Doeg the Edomite =

Biblical chief herdsman to Saul, King of Israel

Doeg (Hebrew: דֹּאֵג Dō’ēg) was an Edomite, chief herdsman to Saul, King of Israel. He is mentioned in the Hebrew Bible book of First Samuel, chapters 21 and 22, where he is depicted as an antagonist of David responsible for the deaths of a large number of priests.

== Biblical account ==
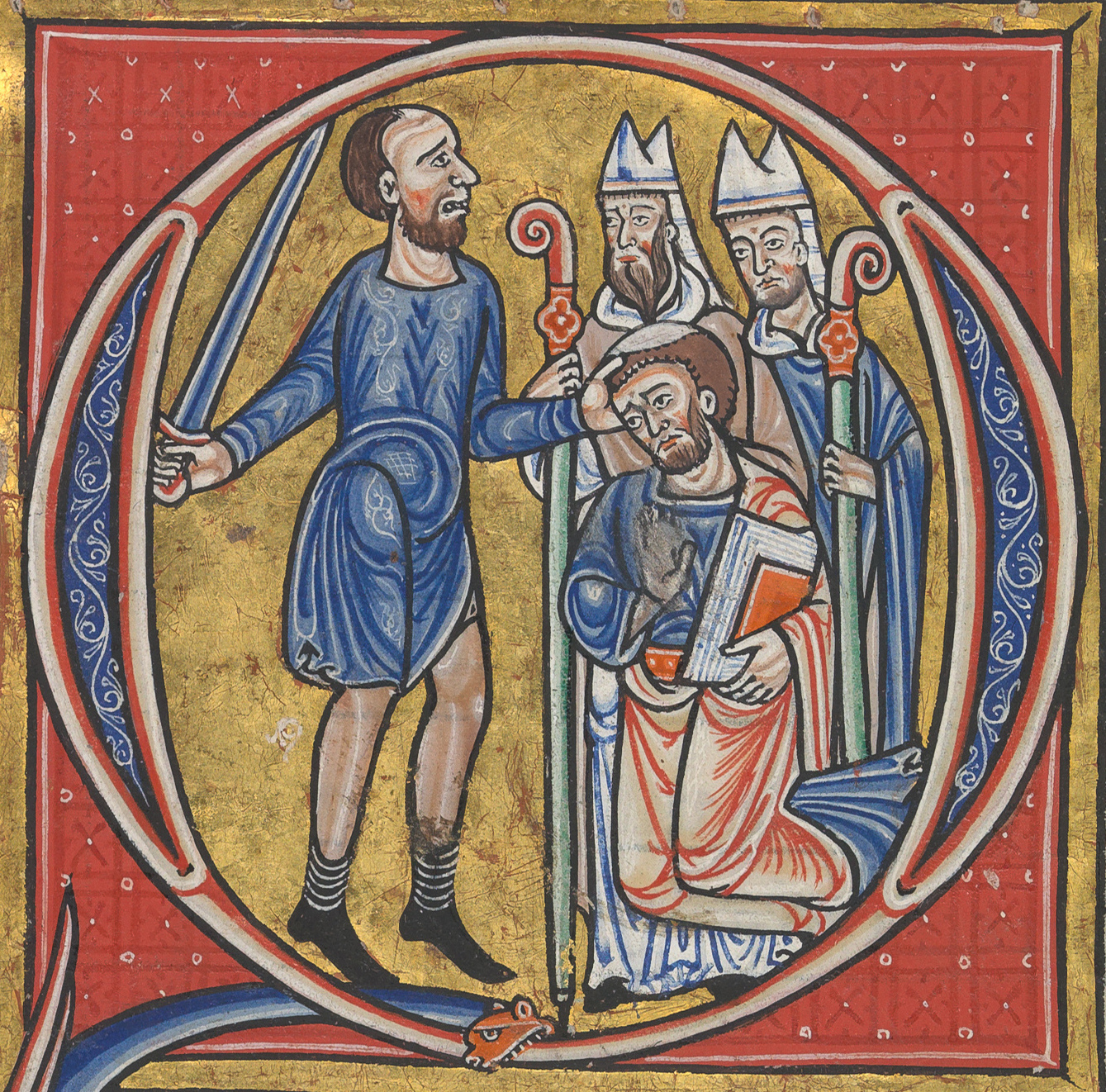
Doeg kills Achimelech and the priests of Nob

Ornament showing Doeg the Edomite beheading the priests of Nob (Macclesfield Psalter)

After parting from Jonathan, David fled from Saul's jealous anger and hid in Nob. He went to Ahimelech, the High Priest, claiming to be on a clandestine royal mission. Ahimelech fed David and his men with the showbread, and gave David the sword of Goliath. By doing this, David endangered Ahimelech's life, since Doeg was present ("detained before the Lord") and witnessed Ahimelech's service to David (1 Sam 21).

Later, Saul asked about the whereabouts of David, prompting Doeg to respond:

Then answered Doeg the Edomite, which was set over the servants of Saul, and said, I saw the son of Jesse coming to Nob, to Ahimelech the son of Ahitub.

— 1 Sam 22:9

Therefore, Saul summoned Ahimelech and his entire company, asking him why he decided to conspire against him by protecting David. Ahimelech, possibly in an attempt to save himself, claimed that he was uninvolved in the controversy between Saul and David. Saul coldly rejected his claim and ordered Ahimelech and the priests to be executed. His officials refused to raise their hands against the priests, and Saul turned to Doeg, who carried out the executions. Saul followed that up with an attack on the city of Nob, the city of the priests, and the families of the priests – men, women, and children – were put to the sword. Only Abiathar escaped, and fled to join David.

The death of Ahimelech, as the great-grandson of Eli, is seen as fulfilling part of the curse on the House of Eli that none of his male descendants would live to old age (1 Samuel 2:31–33).

David later showed remorse for his part in the incident:

And David said unto Abiathar, I knew it that day, when Doeg the Edomite was there, that he would surely tell Saul: I have occasioned the death of all the persons of thy father's house.

— 1 Samuel 22:22

The heading above Psalm 52 records that David wrote it after Doeg the Edomite betrayed Ahimelech to Saul.

== In Rabbinical literature ==
Doeg is the subject of many rabbinical legends, the origins of which are to be found in part in Psalm 52.

Though he died at the early age of thirty-four years, he is regarded by the rabbis as the greatest scholar of his time, a strong description being supposedly applied to him because he made every one with whom he disputed "blush". He could bring forward 300 different questions with reference to one single ritual case. But he was lacking in inward piety, so that God was "anxious" concerning his end, and "mourned" for him. His most unfortunate qualities, however, were his malice, jealousy, and calumnious tongue. He sounded the praise of David before Saul only in order to provoke his jealousy, ascribing to David qualities that Saul lacked. He cherished a grudge against David, whose opinion prevailed over his own in determining the site for the Temple at Jerusalem, and he had well-nigh succeeded in proving by his arguments that David, as a descendant of Ruth the Moabite, could not, according to the Law, belong to the congregation of Israel, when the prophet Samuel interposed in David's favor. He also declared David's marriage with Michal to be invalid, and induced Saul to marry her to another.

Doeg not only disregarded the sanctity of marriage, but he also slew with his own hands the priests of Nob, after Abner and Amasa, Saul's lieutenants, had refused to do so. "...For all his iniquitous deeds he pressed the law into his service, and derived justification of his conduct from it. Ahimelech, the high priest at Nob, admitted that he had consulted the Urim and Thummim for David. This served Doeg as the basis for the charge of treason, and he stated it as an unalterable Halakah that the Urim and Thummim may be consulted only for a king. In vain Abner and Amasa and all the other members of the Sanhedrin demonstrated that the Urim and Thummim may be consulted for any on whose undertaking concerns the general welfare. Doeg would not yield, and as no one could be found to execute the judgement, he himself officiated as hangman. When the motive of revenge actuated him, he held cheap alike the life and honor of his fellow-man. He succeeded in convincing Saul that David's marriage with the king's daughter Michal had lost its validity from the moment David was declared a rebel. As such, he said, David was as good as dead, since a rebel was outlawed. Hence his wife was no longer bound to him. Doeg's punishment accorded with his misdeeds. He who had made impious use of his knowledge of the law, completely forgot the law, and even his disciples rose up against him, and drove him from the house of study. In the end he died a leper." As it often happens with those who strive for something to which they are not entitled, he lost that which he possessed. God sent the three "angels of destruction" to Doeg; the first caused him to forget his learning, the second burned his soul, and the third scattered the ashes. According to some he was slain by his own pupils when they found that he had forgotten his learning; others maintain that he was slain by David when he (Doeg) informed him of the death of Saul and of Jonathan."..The son of Doeg was Saul's armor-bearer, who was killed by David for daring to slay the king even though he longed for death."

According to another Midrash, Doeg tried to preserve the life of Agag, the king of the Amalekites-Edomites, by interpreting Lev. 22:28 into a prohibition against the destruction of both the old and the young in war. Doeg is among those who have forfeited their portion in the future world by their wickedness.(the others include: Ahithophel, Balaam and Gehazi).Doeg is an instance of the evil consequences of calumny, because by slandering the priests of Nob he lost his own life, and caused the death of Saul, Ahimelech, and Abner.

Later, in divine retribution for David's role in causing the death of the priests at Nob, after the death of his successor and descendant, Jehoram, all the male descendants of that line were slaughtered at the hand of Athaliah. Only one, Jehoash (Joash), escaped death, corresponding to the one priest, Abiathar, who survived Doeg's massacre at Nob.
