= Wife–sister narratives in the Book of Genesis =

Wife-sister narratives in Genesis

In biblical studies, the term wife–sister narratives in Genesis refers to three strikingly similar stories in chapters 12, 20, and 26 of the Book of Genesis (part of the Torah and Old Testament). At the core of each is the story of a biblical patriarch who has come to be in the land of a powerful foreign overlord who misidentifies the Patriarch's wife as the Patriarch's sister, and consequently attempts to wed her himself. The overlord later finds out his error. Two of the three stories are similar in many other details, including the ruler's name, Abimelech.

== Synopsis of the three narratives ==
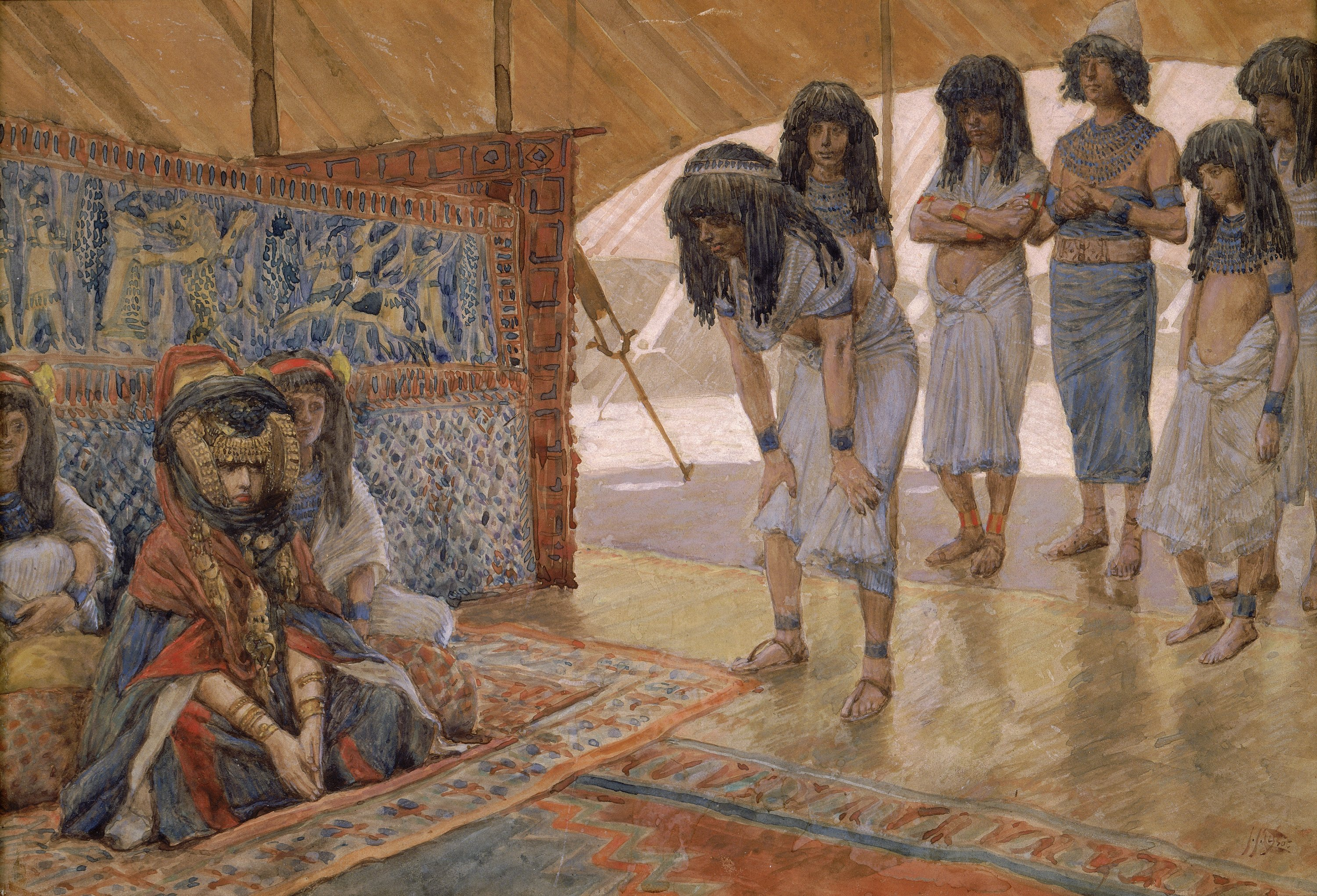
Sarai Is Taken to Pharaoh's Palace by James Tissot.

=== Abram and Pharaoh ===
The first episode appears in Genesis 12:10–20. Abram (later called Abraham) moves to ancient Egypt in order to avoid a famine in southern Canaan. Because his wife, Sarai (later called Sarah), is very beautiful, Abram asks her to say that she is his sister, lest the Egyptians kill him so that they can take her. On arriving before the Pharaoh, the Egyptians recognise Sarai's beauty, and the Egyptian princes shower Abram with gifts of livestock and servants to gain her hand in marriage. Sarai is "taken into Pharaoh's house". God then sends a plague: Pharaoh restores Sarai to Abram, and orders them to leave Egypt with all the possessions Abram had acquired in Egypt.

=== Abraham and Abimelech ===
Genesis 20:1–16 narrates the story of Abraham emigrating to the southern region of Gerar, whose king is named Abimelech. Abraham states that Sarah, his wife, is really his sister, leading Abimelech to try to take Sarah as a wife; however, God intervened before Abimelech touched Sarah. Abimelech complains to Abraham, who states that Sarah is his half-sister.

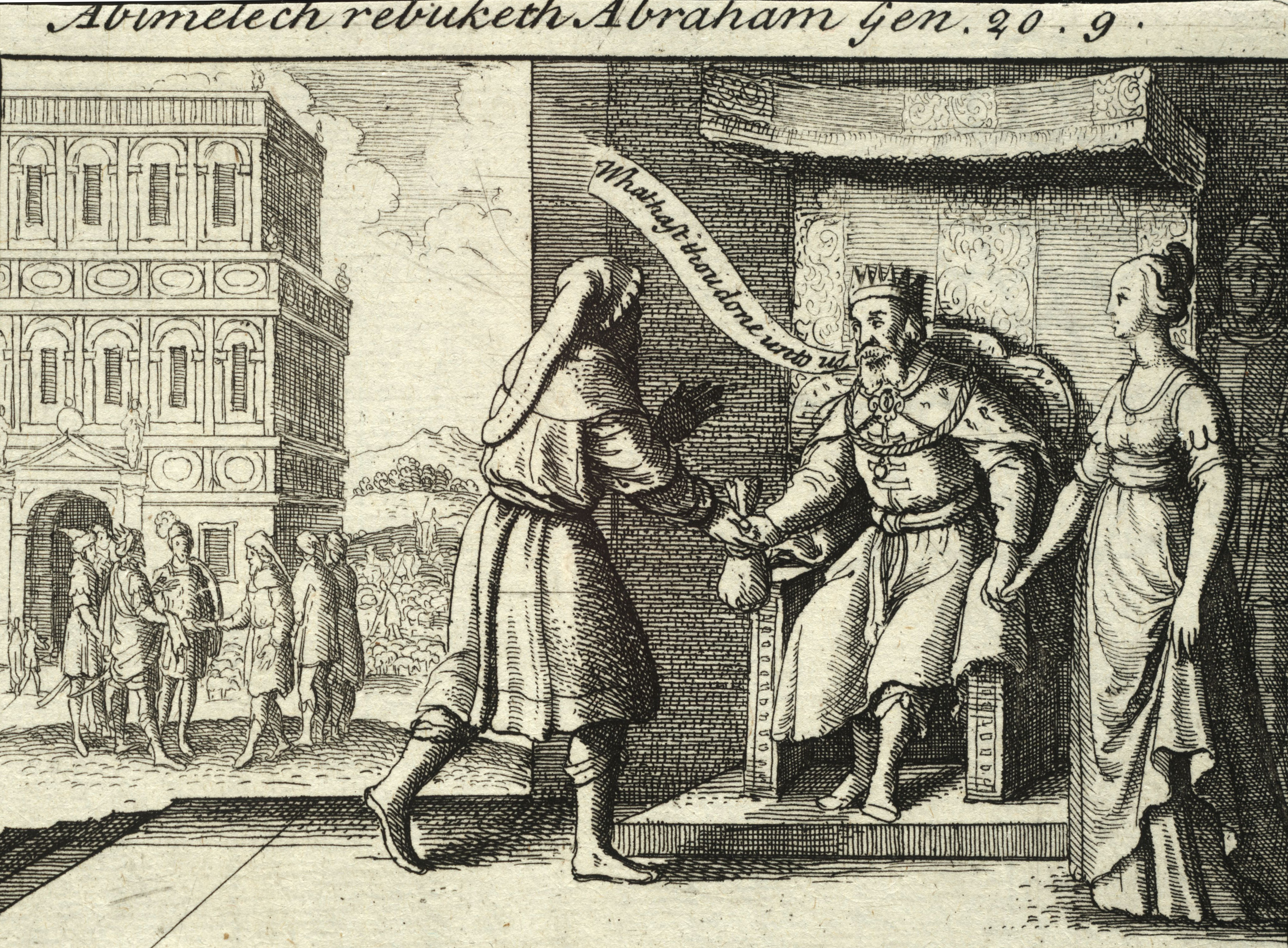
Abimelech rebuking Abraham by Wenceslas Hollar. Abimelech asks Abraham, "What hast thou done unto us?"

Abimelech then restores Sarah to Abraham, and gives him gifts of livestock and servants by way of apology, and also allows Abraham to reside anywhere in Gerar. Abimelech also gives 1000 pieces of silver to Abraham to reprove Sarah by a "covering of the eyes". Abraham then prays for Abimelech and the king and his wife and concubines are able to conceive children; they previously could not.

=== Isaac and Abimelech ===
The third episode appears in Genesis 26:1–33. Here it is Isaac who, in order to avoid a famine, emigrates to the southern region of Gerar, whose king is named Abimelech. Isaac has been told to do so by God, who also orders him to avoid Egypt, and promises to him the fulfillment of the oath made with Abraham. Isaac states that Rebekah, his wife, is really his sister, as he is worried that the Philistines will otherwise kill him in order to marry Rebekah. After a while, Abimelech sees Isaac sporting (Hebrew mitsahek) with Rebekah and states that she must be Isaac's wife rather than his sister.

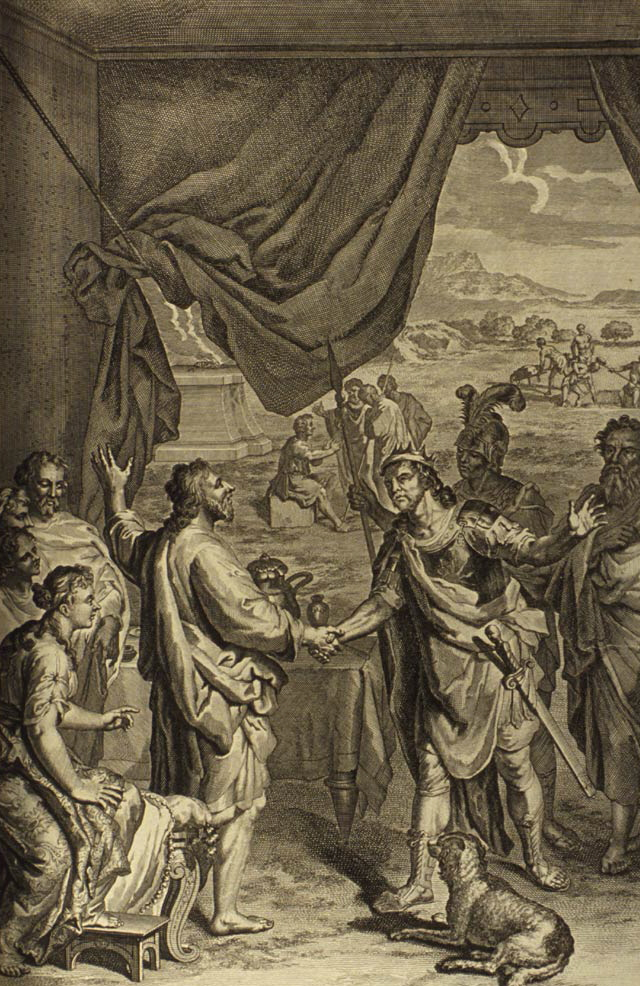
Isaac and Abimelech Swear Friendship. This occurred at Beersheba.

Abimelech then orders that Rebekah be left alone by the denizens of Gerar, on pain of death. Isaac goes on to spend a year in the area, and becomes wealthy, leading the Philistines in Gerar to envy him, so Abimelech sends Isaac away.

== Historical-critical analysis of the narratives ==
The Jewish Encyclopedia's article "Sarah" notes that

the story of Sarah's life, brief and incomplete as it is, presents nevertheless curious repetitions, e.g., the incident with Pharaoh and a similar incident with Abimelech (Genesis 12:10 and Genesis 20:1).

According to the Jewish Encyclopedia, the recurring story has a unified purpose:

From the point of view of the history of culture these episodes are very instructive. But it is not very probable that Abraham would have run the risk twice. Moreover, a similar incident is reported in regard to Isaac and Rebecca (Genesis 26:7–11). This recurrence indicates that none of the accounts is to be accepted as historical; all three are variations of a theme common to the popular oral histories of the Patriarchs. That women were married in the way here supposed is not to be doubted. The purpose of the story is to extol the heroines as most beautiful and show that the Patriarchs were under the special protection of the Deity.

=== Comparison to other cultures ===
Political marriages were common occurrences in the Ancient Near East, which typically meant that a resident alien would offer one of his daughters to the monarch as a diplomatic action and to protect himself and his family. James Hoffmeier interprets the wife-sister narratives found in the Book of Genesis as reflecting that practice; in his view Abraham and Isaac were traveling in foreign territory without any daughters to offer the local ruler and attempted to create similar diplomatic relationships by presenting their wives as potential gifts.

=== Source criticism ===
From the perspective of source criticism, these three accounts would appear to be variations on the same theme, with the oldest explication being that in Gen. 12. In the past, the first and third accounts have been attributed to the Yahwist source (or J source), and the second account has been attributed to the Elohist source (or the E source) via source criticism. However, it has also been proposed that similarity between these narratives is because they are oral variations of one original story. Recently, it has been thought that the second and third accounts were based on and had knowledge of the first account. According to critics, such as T.D. Alexander, there are different theories about the sources but none can be proven to be flawless.

=== Literary analysis ===
Scholars have also argued that the three tales are not true historic occurrences, rather purposeful tales. According to Susan Niditch, there is one wife-sister story that has many different versions, but there are inconsistencies and they all refer back to the same story. Niditch associates the wife-sister entries as potential folklore written to target a particular audience and in hopes of conveying a message regarding the sinful nature of deception and adultery.

The three wife-sister narratives are all related to each other in some way, according to George Coats, sharing common content, structure and genre for communicating the content. In all three stories a promise for progeny is not a factor in the content and the structure rather the narratives have a focus on blessing.

=== The wife and sister relationships ===
Gershon Hepner concludes, through biblical exegesis and semantics, that it is plausible that the union of Abraham and Sarah was actually incestuous with Sarah being Abraham's half-sister. For example, in Genesis 20:13, Abraham, talking to Abimelech, alludes to Leviticus laws or the Holiness code, by using the phrase "loving kindness". The same word is found referring to the sin of incestuous relationships and can also take the alternative meaning of "disgrace". Abraham, in his discourse with Abimelech, could be openly confessing his "disgraceful" relations with his wife/sister Sarah but whichever translation of the word is taken, it shows Abraham's knowledge of the holiness code and specifically its prohibitions on incest, as later recorded in Leviticus.

== Rabbinic interpretation ==
An explanation presented in classical times, and suggested by Rashi, argued that when a stranger comes to town, the proper thing to do would be to inquire if he needs food and drink, not whether his female companion is a married woman, and hence as Abimelech did the latter, it tipped off Abraham to the fact that there is no fear of God in this place, and so he lied about his relationship with Sarah in order to avoid being killed. Consequently, it could be argued that the parallel behaviour results from this lack of fear of God by the antagonists in the other two similar situations.

== Later influence ==
The film Days of Heaven, written and directed by Terrence Malick, is centered around a wife–sister narrative similar to those of the Old Testament. In 1916, after an incident in Chicago, a man, Bill, flees to the Texas Panhandle with his girlfriend, Abby, and his young sister, where they find work on a large farm. He and his girlfriend pretend to be siblings to avoid gossip, and the farm's wealthy but sickly owner falls in love with Abby, eventually asking her to marry him. Bill encourages the union, hoping that Abby will inherit the owner's money after his imminent death. As the owner begins to suspect the truth, the farm is plagued by a swarm of locusts and then destroyed by a fire.

== Sources ==
- Israel Finkelstein (2002). The Bible Unearthed. Free Press. ISBN 0-684-86913-6.
- Robin Lane Fox (1992). The Unauthorized Version. Knopf. p. 409f.
- Richard Elliott Friedman (1987). Who Wrote The Bible?. New York: Harper and Row. ISBN 0-06-063035-3.
- Richard Elliott Friedman (2003). The Bible with sources revealed. HarperSanFrancisco. ISBN 0-06-053069-3.
- Jewish Encyclopedia.
- Savina Teubal (1984). Sarah The Priestess: The First Matriarch Of Genesis. Swallow Press. ISBN 978-0-8040-0844-0.
- Robinson (1977). Biblical Researches. Swallow Press. ISBN 0-405-10281-X.
- New American Bible. — note the footnotes for Genesis 26 and 20-21
- Emanuel Feldman. Changing patterns in Biblical criticism. Tradition 1965;7(4) and 1966;8(5).
- J. Cheryl Exum. Fragmented Women: Feminist (Sub)versions of Biblical Narratives (1993).
