= 1 Samuel 25 =

First Book of Samuel chapter

- ← chapter 24 chapter 26 →
- The pages containing the Books of Samuel (1 & 2 Samuel) in Leningrad Codex (1008 CE).
- Book: First book of Samuel
- Hebrew Bible part: Nevi'im
- Order in the Hebrew part: 3
- Category: Former Prophets
- Christian Bible part: Old Testament
- Order in the Christian part: 9

1 Samuel 25 is the twenty-fifth chapter of the First Book of Samuel in the Old Testament of the Christian Bible or the first part of the Books of Samuel in the Hebrew Bible. Jewish tradition attributes the book to the prophet Samuel, with later additions by the prophets Gad and Nathan; modern scholarship, however, regards it as a compilation of independent texts dated to c. 630–540 BCE. This chapter contains the account of David's escape from Saul's repeated attempts to kill him. This is within a section comprising 1 Samuel 16 to 2 Samuel 5 which records the rise of David as the king of Israel.

== Text ==
This chapter was originally written in Biblical Hebrew. It is divided into 22 verses.

=== Textual witnesses ===
Some early manuscripts containing the text of this chapter in Hebrew are of the Masoretic Textual tradition, which includes the Codex Cairensis (895), Aleppo Codex (10th century), and Codex Leningradensis (1008). Fragments containing parts of this chapter in Hebrew were found among the Dead Sea Scrolls including 4Q51 (4QSam^{a}; 100–50 BCE) with extant verses 3–12, 20–21, 25–27, 38–40 and 4Q53 (4QSam^{c}; 100–75 BCE) with extant verses 30–31.

Extant ancient manuscripts of a translation into Koine Greek known as the Septuagint (originally was made in the last few centuries BCE) include Codex Vaticanus (B; $\mathfrak{G}$^{B}; 4th century) and Codex Alexandrinus (A; $\mathfrak{G}$^{A}; 5th century). (Note: The whole book of 1 Samuel is missing from the extant Codex Sinaiticus.)

== Places ==
Places mentioned in this chapter
- Carmel
- Maon
- Paran
- Ramah

== Death of Samuel (verse 1) ==
And Samuel died; and all the Israelites were gathered together, and lamented him, and buried him in his house at Ramah.
And David arose, and went down to the wilderness of Paran.

Samuel's death was at a time when Saul had acknowledged the issue of succession (24:20) and that David, the one anointed by Samuel, would come to the throne.

- "The wilderness of Paran" (Biblical Hebrew: מִדְבַּר פָּארָן, romanized: midbar Paʾran): According to the Masoretic Text; the Septuagint has "the wilderness of Maon".

== David, Nabal, and Abigail (verses 2–44) ==
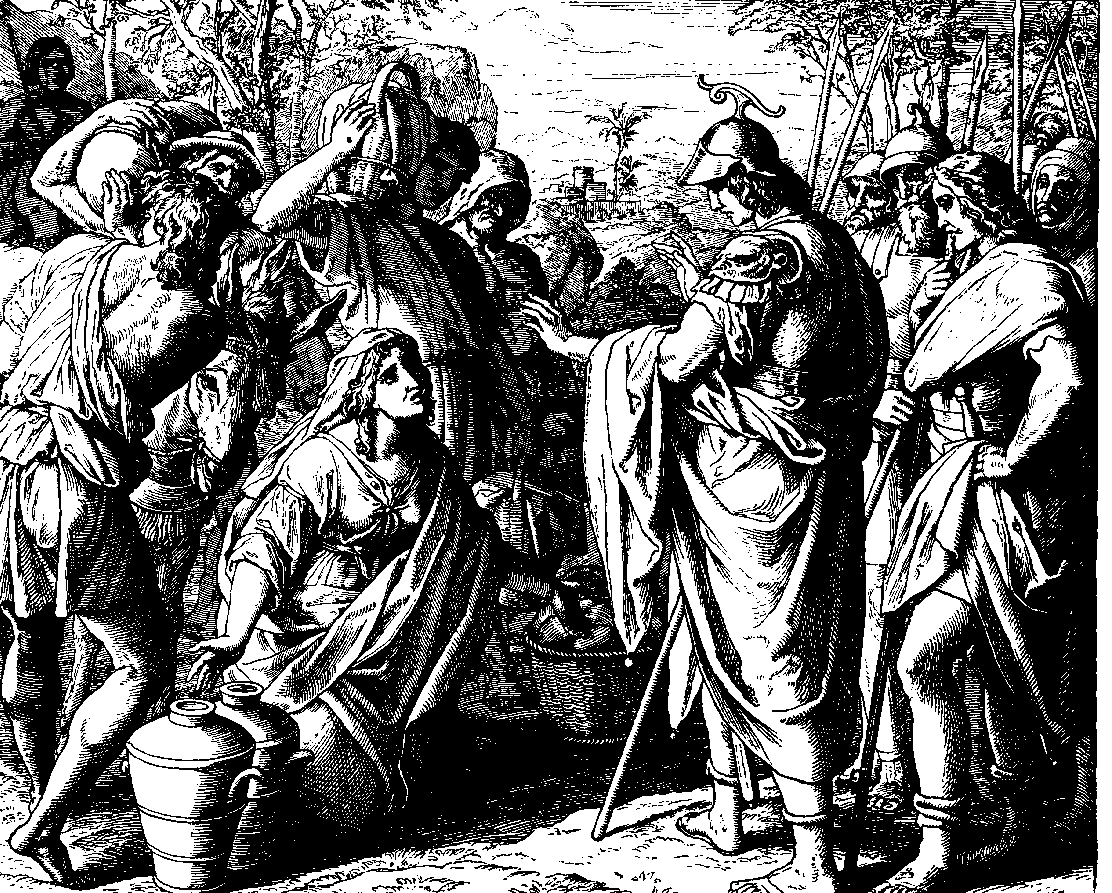
David and Abigail, 1860 woodcut by Julius Schnorr von Karolsfeld

The accounts in 1 Samuel 24 and 26 report David's refusal to kill Saul as God's anointed one (מָשִׁיחַ, māšīaḥ), but in this chapter, he was almost guilty of killing many innocent people in the household of Nabal and Abigail, who lived in Maon. Nabal (נָבָל, Nāḇāl, 'fool') was a "surly and mean" man, but his wife, Abigail, was "clever and beautiful", personifying the fool and the virtuous wife in Jewish wisdom literature, respectively. The first part of the narrative (verses 2–12) details how Nabal foolishly refused David's request for provision, which was carefully structured in verses 5–8:

1. The offer of peace and friendship to Nabal and his household.
2. A reminder that Nabal's shepherds were not harmed when they were with David's men (i.e., easily verifiable).
3. A request for supplies as compensation for David's protection of Nabal's shepherds. Nabal acted arrogantly in his two questions in verse 10, dismissing David as insignificant and possibly implying he is aware of David's conflict with Saul ("men who come from I do not know where"). The reference to Nabal as a ben blliya'al (בֶּן־בְּלִיַּעַל, ben-bəliyyaʿal, 'son of worthlessness') in verse 17 may classify him with those who despised Saul when he was king-elect (1 Samuel 10:27) and suggest that Nabal also was rejecting a king-elect and refusing to pay him tribute. Angry from the humiliation, David was in danger of taking matters into his own hand and not relying on YHWH; he was saved, however, from taking foolish action through the interference of Abigail, who was informed of the situation by one of Nabal's servants who liked David and was critical of his master's rash response (verses 14–18). Abigail intercepted David as he was on his way to annihilate the house of Nabal (verse 22) without consulting her husband, whom she also counted as a fool (verse 25). She carried provisions to David and his men, among which were bread, wine, clusters of raisins, and fig-cakes, which assuaged the wrath of David's men. Without Abigail's intervention, David would have become guilty of blood-guilt and taken vengeance with his men instead of restraining himself and trusting God, as detailed in Abigail's words (verses 26–31) and David's response (verses 32–34). When Nabal died of sickness, David remembered Abigail (verse 30) and decided to take her as his wife, which gave David another advantage: the house of Nabal was a prominent member of the Calebite clan and had control over Hebron, so marrying Nabal's widow would give David control of a territory that would later be significant when David was later declared king at Hebron (2 Samuel 2:1–4). (Note: The reasoning being similar to why he married Ahinoam of Jezreel as another wife.)

=== Verse 5 ===
So David sent ten young men. And David said to the young men, "Go up to Carmel, and go to Nabal and greet him in my name".

- "Carmel" (כַּרְמֶל, karmel, lit. 'orchard' or 'vineyard land'): the same place where Saul built a monument for himself (1 Samuel 15:12), so Nabal could actually be a supporter of Saul.

=== Verse 39 ===
So when David heard that Nabal was dead, he said, "Blessed be the LORD, who has pleaded the cause of my reproach from the hand of Nabal, and has kept His servant from evil! For the LORD has returned the wickedness of Nabal on his own head." And David sent and proposed to Abigail, to take her as his wife.

- Abigail became David's third wife, Michal—who had been given in marriage to another man by Saul 1 Samuel 25:44—and Ahinoam of Jezreel having preceded her. (Note: Not the same as Ahinoam, the wife of Saul.)

== See also ==
- Anointing
- Belial
- Caleb
- Drunkenness
- Israelites
- Jesse
- Israel
- Laish
- Michal
- Phalti
- Philistines
- Sling (weapon)
- Related Bible parts: 1 Samuel 24, 1 Samuel 26, 1 Chronicles 3

== Sources ==
=== Commentaries on Samuel ===
- Auld, Graeme (2003). "1 & 2 Samuel". In James D. G. Dunn and John William Rogerson (ed.). Eerdmans Commentary on the Bible. Eerdmans. ISBN 9780802837110.
- Bergen, David T. (1996). 1, 2 Samuel. B&H Publishing Group. ISBN 9780805401073.
- Chapman, Stephen B. (2016). 1 Samuel as Christian Scripture: A Theological Commentary. Wm. B. Eerdmans Publishing Company. ISBN 978-1467445160.
- Evans, Paul (2018). Longman, Tremper (ed.). 1-2 Samuel. The Story of God Bible Commentary. Zondervan Academic. ISBN 978-0310490944.
- Gordon, Robert (1986). I & II Samuel, A Commentary. Paternoster Press. ISBN 9780310230229.
- Hertzberg, Hans Wilhelm (1964). I & II Samuel, A Commentary (trans. from German 2nd edition 1960 ed.). Westminster John Knox Press. p. 19. ISBN 978-0664223182.
- Tsumura, David Toshio (2007). The First Book of Samuel. Eerdmans. ISBN 9780802823595.

=== General ===
- Breytenbach, Andries (2000). "Who Is Behind The Samuel Narrative?". In Johannes Cornelis de Moor and H.F. Van Rooy (ed.). Past, Present, Future: the Deuteronomistic History and the Prophets. Brill. ISBN 9789004118713.
- Coogan, Michael David (2007). Coogan, Michael David; Brettler, Marc Zvi; Newsom, Carol Ann; Perkins, Pheme (eds.). The New Oxford Annotated Bible with the Apocryphal/Deuterocanonical Books: New Revised Standard Version, Issue 48 (Augmented 3rd ed.). Oxford University Press. ISBN 978-0195288810.
- Fitzmyer, Joseph A. (2008). A Guide to the Dead Sea Scrolls and Related Literature. Grand Rapids, MI: William B. Eerdmans Publishing Company. ISBN 9780802862419.
- Halley, Henry H. (1965). Halley's Bible Handbook: an abbreviated Bible commentary (24th (revised) ed.). Zondervan Publishing House. ISBN 0-310-25720-4.
- Hayes, Christine (2015). Introduction to the Bible. Yale University Press. ISBN 978-0300188271.
- Jones, Gwilym H. (2007). "12. 1 and 2 Samuel". In Barton, John; Muddiman, John (eds.). The Oxford Bible Commentary (first (paperback) ed.). Oxford University Press. pp. 196–232. ISBN 978-0199277186.
- Klein, R.W. (2003). "Samuel, books of". In Bromiley, Geoffrey W (ed.). The International Standard Bible Encyclopedia. Eerdmans. ISBN 9780802837844.
- Knight, Douglas A (1995). "Chapter 4 Deuteronomy and the Deuteronomists". In James Luther Mays, David L. Petersen and Kent Harold Richards (ed.). Old Testament Interpretation. T&T Clark. ISBN 9780567292896.
- Ulrich, Eugene, ed. (2010). The Biblical Qumran Scrolls: Transcriptions and Textual Variants. Brill.
- Würthwein, Ernst (1995). The Text of the Old Testament. Translated by Rhodes, Erroll F. Grand Rapids, MI: Wm. B. Eerdmans. ISBN 0-8028-0788-7.
