= 1 Samuel 22 =

First Book of Samuel chapter

- ← chapter 21 chapter 23 →
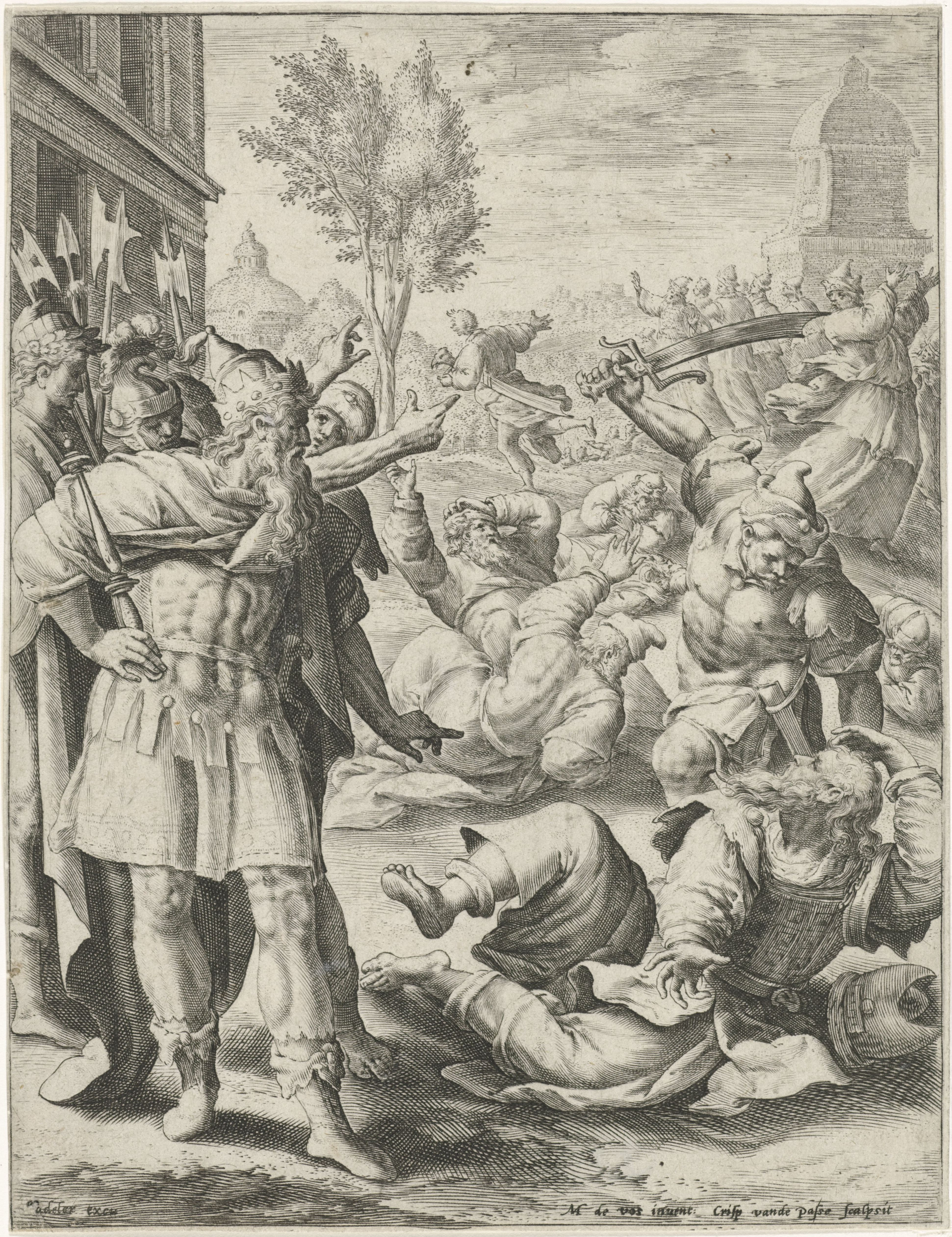
- "Doeg kills Ahimelech and his family", by Maerten de Vos (1591).
- Book: First book of Samuel
- Hebrew Bible part: Nevi'im
- Order in the Hebrew part: 3
- Category: Former Prophets
- Christian Bible part: Old Testament
- Order in the Christian part: 9

1 Samuel 22 is the twenty-second chapter of the First Book of Samuel in the Old Testament of the Christian Bible or the first part of the Books of Samuel in the Hebrew Bible. Jewish tradition attributes the book to the prophet Samuel, with later additions by the prophets Gad and Nathan; modern scholarship, however, regards it as a compilation of independent texts dated to c. 630–540 BCE. This chapter contains the account of David's escape from Saul's repeated attempts to kill him, as well as the massacre of the priests in Nob. Chapter 22 is within a section comprising 1 Samuel 16 to 2 Samuel 5 which records the rise of David as the king of Israel.

== Text ==
This chapter was originally written in Biblical Hebrew. It is divided into 23 verses.

=== Textual witnesses ===
Some early manuscripts containing the text of this chapter in Hebrew are of the Masoretic Text tradition, which includes the Codex Cairensis (895), Aleppo Codex (10th century), and Codex Leningradensis (1008). Fragments containing parts of this chapter in Hebrew were found among the Dead Sea Scrolls including 4Q51 (4QSam^{a}; 100–50 BCE) with extant verses 10–11 and 4Q52 (4QSam^{b}; 250 BCE) with extant verses 8–9.

Extant ancient manuscripts of a translation into Koine Greek known as the Septuagint (originally created in the last few centuries BCE) include Codex Vaticanus (B; $\mathfrak{G}$^{B}; 4th century) and Codex Alexandrinus (A; $\mathfrak{G}$^{A}; 5th century). (Note: The whole book of 1 Samuel is missing from the extant Codex Sinaiticus.)

== Places ==
Places mentioned in this chapter
- Adullam
- Gibeah
- Hereth
- Mizpah or Mizpeh in Moab
- Nob
- Ramah

== David in Adullam and Moab (22:1–5) ==
David is now an outlaw (this continues throughout chapter 26) and hides in Adullam (עֲדֻלָּם, ʿădul·lām), where he is joined by his family and "all those who were deprived and embittered," and he becomes a leader of a group of "malcontents."

=== Verses 1–2 ===
^{1}David therefore departed from there and escaped to the cave of Adullam. So when his brothers and all his father’s house heard it, they went down there to him. ^{2}And everyone who was in distress, everyone who was in debt, and everyone who was discontented gathered to him. So he became captain over them. And there were about four hundred men with him."

- "Adullam": a "cave", according to the Masoretic Text, which also functioned as a "stronghold" (according to the Septuagint's verse 4), located to the southwest of Jerusalem in the Shephelah. The geographical condition of the wilderness around Adullam in Judah had long been a hideout of fugitives.

=== Verses 3–4 ===
^{3}Then David went from there to [the] Mizpah of Moab; and he said to the king of Moab, "Please let my father and mother come here with you, till I know what God will do for me." ^{4}So he brought them before the king of Moab, and they dwelt with him all the time that David was in the stronghold."

Due to the uncertainty of his life as an outlaw and its potential impact on his family, David sought asylum for his parents in Moab. He may have made his choice based on his ancestral connections to Moab through Ruth (Ruth 4:17–22) or the Moabites' likely support as an enemy of Saul, who had defeated Moab in battle (1 Samuel 14:47). His action proved to be a smart one because Saul was very suspicious of any conspiracy and would kill anyone he suspected of engaging in one, including their families (verses 8 and 13).

=== Verse 5 ===
Then the prophet Gad said to David, "Do not remain in the stronghold; depart, and go into the land of Judah." So David departed and went into the forest of Hereth.

- Gad: later became a court prophet (2 Samuel 24:11–19).
- "Hereth": a forested area in Judah assumed to be on the border of the Philistine plain, in the southern part of Judah.

== Massacre of the priests of Nob (22:6–23) ==
The sequel narrative to David's visit to Nob opens with Saul sitting in council at Gibeah accusing the members of his own tribe, the Benjaminites, (Note: ^{6}When Saul heard that David and the men with him had been located—Saul was then in Gibeah, sitting under the tamarisk tree on the height, spear in hand, with all his courtiers in attendance upon him. ^{7}Saul said to the courtiers standing about him, "Listen, Benjaminites! Will the son of Jesse give fields and vineyards to every one of you? And will he make all of you captains of thousands or captains of hundreds?") of conspiracy and of not disclosing to him the pact between David and Jonathan (verse 8). He therefore immediately isolates himself from his tribe. Doeg the Edomite, the "chief of the shepherds" in 1 Samuel 21:7, who is now titled "in charge of Saul's servants", reports that Ahimelech aided David by giving him bread and Goliath's sword. Ahimelech, who was called to come before Saul, protests his innocence by claiming that he had treated David as Saul's obedient servant and son-in-law without knowledge of a change in David's status. Saul commands his servants to kill the priests, but they refuse to obey; Saul then commands Doeg, who, being an Edomite, executes the entire priesthood of Nob and commits blood revenge on the whole city (verse 19). One priest, Abiathar, son of Ahimelech, son of Ahitub, escapes and attaches himself to David, thereby fulfilling the prophecy of 2:27–36, as well as securing for David the service of a priest with the ephod (1 Samuel 23:9–12). The priest Abiathar remained with him as High Priest of Israel until he was eventually banished by Solomon (1 Kings 2:26–27). In the end, this narrative contrasts Saul, whose act of reprisal had cost him service of the priesthood, with David, who had access to YHWH through the only priest left.

=== Verses 9–10 ===
^{9}Then answered Doeg the Edomite, who was set over the servants of Saul, and said, "I saw the son of Jesse going to Nob, to Ahimelech the son of Ahitub. ^{10}And he inquired of the LORD for him, gave him provisions, and gave him the sword of Goliath the Philistine."

The reference to Doeg the Edomite in 1 Samuel 21:7 becomes meaningful in this part of the narrative, which may add to the long-standing animosity between Israel and Edom.

== See also ==
- Abiathar
- Ahimelech
- Ahitub
- Ephod
- Edomite
- Goliath
- Herder
- Jesse
- Kohen
- Philistines
- Saul
- Tribe of Benjamin
- Related Bible parts: 1 Samuel 17, 1 Samuel 18, 1 Samuel 20, 1 Samuel 21

== Sources ==
=== Commentaries on Samuel ===
- Auld, Graeme (2003). "1 & 2 Samuel". In James D. G. Dunn and John William Rogerson (ed.). Eerdmans Commentary on the Bible. Eerdmans. ISBN 9780802837110.
- Bergen, David T. (1996). 1, 2 Samuel. B&H Publishing Group. ISBN 9780805401073.
- Chapman, Stephen B. (2016). 1 Samuel as Christian Scripture: A Theological Commentary. Wm. B. Eerdmans Publishing Company. ISBN 978-1467445160.
- Evans, Paul (2018). Longman, Tremper (ed.). 1-2 Samuel. The Story of God Bible Commentary. Zondervan Academic. ISBN 978-0310490944.
- Gordon, Robert (1986). I & II Samuel, A Commentary. Paternoster Press. ISBN 9780310230229.
- Hertzberg, Hans Wilhelm (1964). I & II Samuel, A Commentary (trans. from German 2nd edition 1960 ed.). Westminster John Knox Press. p. 19. ISBN 978-0664223182.
- Tsumura, David Toshio (2007). The First Book of Samuel. Eerdmans. ISBN 9780802823595.

=== General ===
- Breytenbach, Andries (2000). "Who Is Behind The Samuel Narrative?". In Johannes Cornelis de Moor and H.F. Van Rooy (ed.). Past, Present, Future: the Deuteronomistic History and the Prophets. Brill. ISBN 9789004118713.
- Coogan, Michael David (2007). Coogan, Michael David; Brettler, Marc Zvi; Newsom, Carol Ann; Perkins, Pheme (eds.). The New Oxford Annotated Bible with the Apocryphal/Deuterocanonical Books: New Revised Standard Version, Issue 48 (Augmented 3rd ed.). Oxford University Press. ISBN 978-0195288810.
- Fitzmyer, Joseph A. (2008). A Guide to the Dead Sea Scrolls and Related Literature. Grand Rapids, MI: William B. Eerdmans Publishing Company. ISBN 9780802862419.
- Halley, Henry H. (1965). Halley's Bible Handbook: an abbreviated Bible commentary (24th (revised) ed.). Zondervan Publishing House. ISBN 0-310-25720-4.
- Hayes, Christine (2015). Introduction to the Bible. Yale University Press. ISBN 978-0300188271.
- Jones, Gwilym H. (2007). "12. 1 and 2 Samuel". In Barton, John; Muddiman, John (eds.). The Oxford Bible Commentary (first (paperback) ed.). Oxford University Press. pp. 196–232. ISBN 978-0199277186.
- Klein, R.W. (2003). "Samuel, books of". In Bromiley, Geoffrey W (ed.). The International Standard Bible Encyclopedia. Eerdmans. ISBN 9780802837844.
- Knight, Douglas A (1995). "Chapter 4 Deuteronomy and the Deuteronomists". In James Luther Mays, David L. Petersen and Kent Harold Richards (ed.). Old Testament Interpretation. T&T Clark. ISBN 9780567292896.
- Ulrich, Eugene, ed. (2010). The Biblical Qumran Scrolls: Transcriptions and Textual Variants. Brill.
- Würthwein, Ernst (1995). The Text of the Old Testament. Translated by Rhodes, Erroll F. Grand Rapids, MI: Wm. B. Eerdmans. ISBN 0-8028-0788-7.
