= Abimelech =

Name given to Philistine kings in the Hebrew Bible

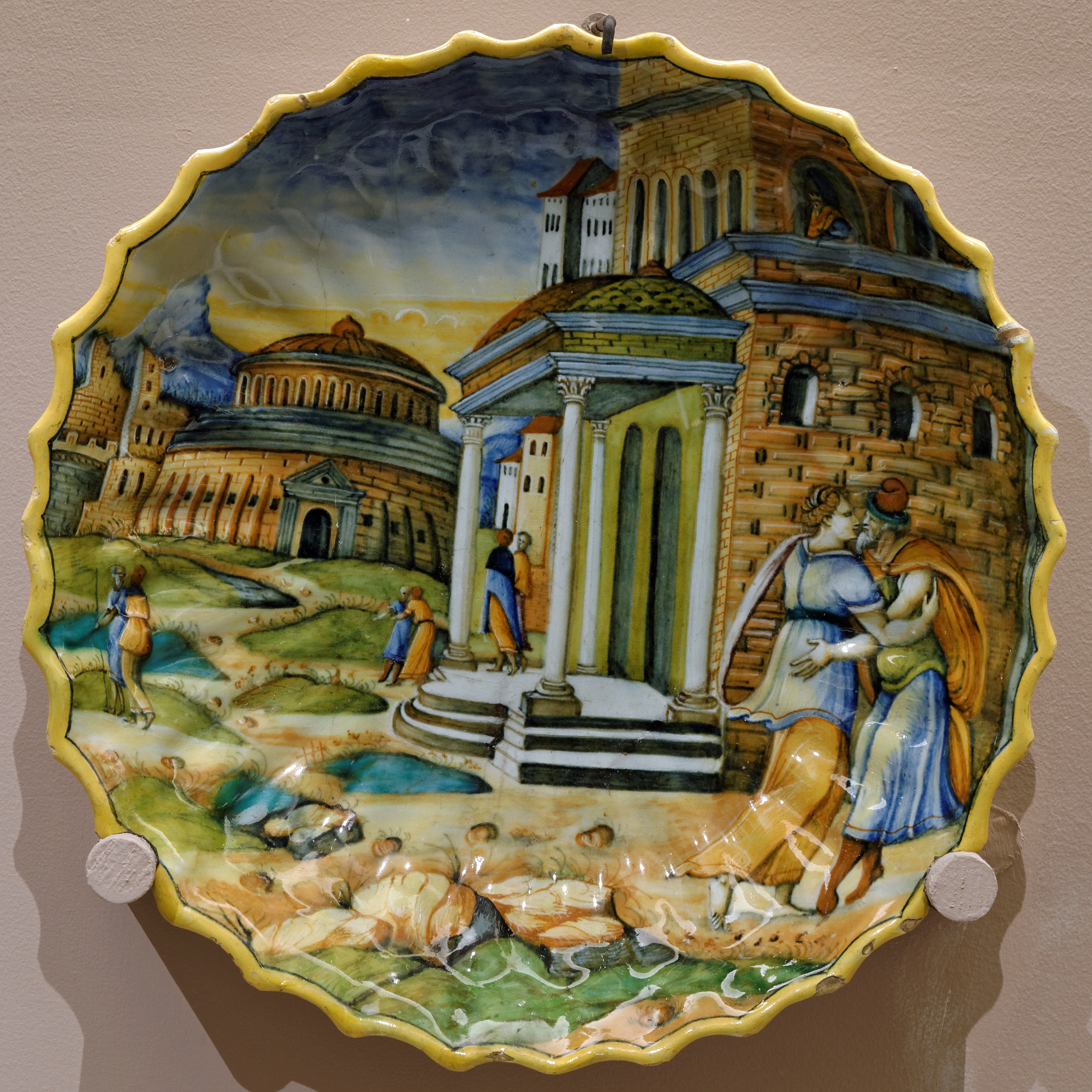
Abimelech spying on Isaac and Rebekah; dish with serrated edge; majolica ceramics – Museum of Fine Arts of Lyon

Abimelech (also spelled Abimelek or Avimelech; Hebrew: אֲבִימֶלֶךְ / אֲבִימָלֶךְ, Modern ʼAvīméleḵ / ʼAvīmáleḵ Tiberian ʼAḇīmeleḵ / ʼAḇīmāleḵ, "my father is a king"/"my father reigns") was the generic name given to all Philistine kings in the Hebrew Bible from the time of Abraham until that of King David. In particlular, Abimelech, king of Gerar, features in relation to Abraham and his wife/sister Sarah in Genesis 20, and to Isaac and Rebekah in Genesis 26. In the Book of Judges, Abimelech, son of Gideon, of the Tribe of Manasseh, is proclaimed king of Shechem after the death of his father.

== Etymology ==
The name or title Abimelech is formed from Hebrew words for "father" and "king", and may be interpreted as "Father-King", "My father is king", or "Father of a king". In the Pentateuch, it is used as a title for kings in the land of Canaan.

== Abimelech of Gerar ==
Two pictures by Wenceslaus Hollar

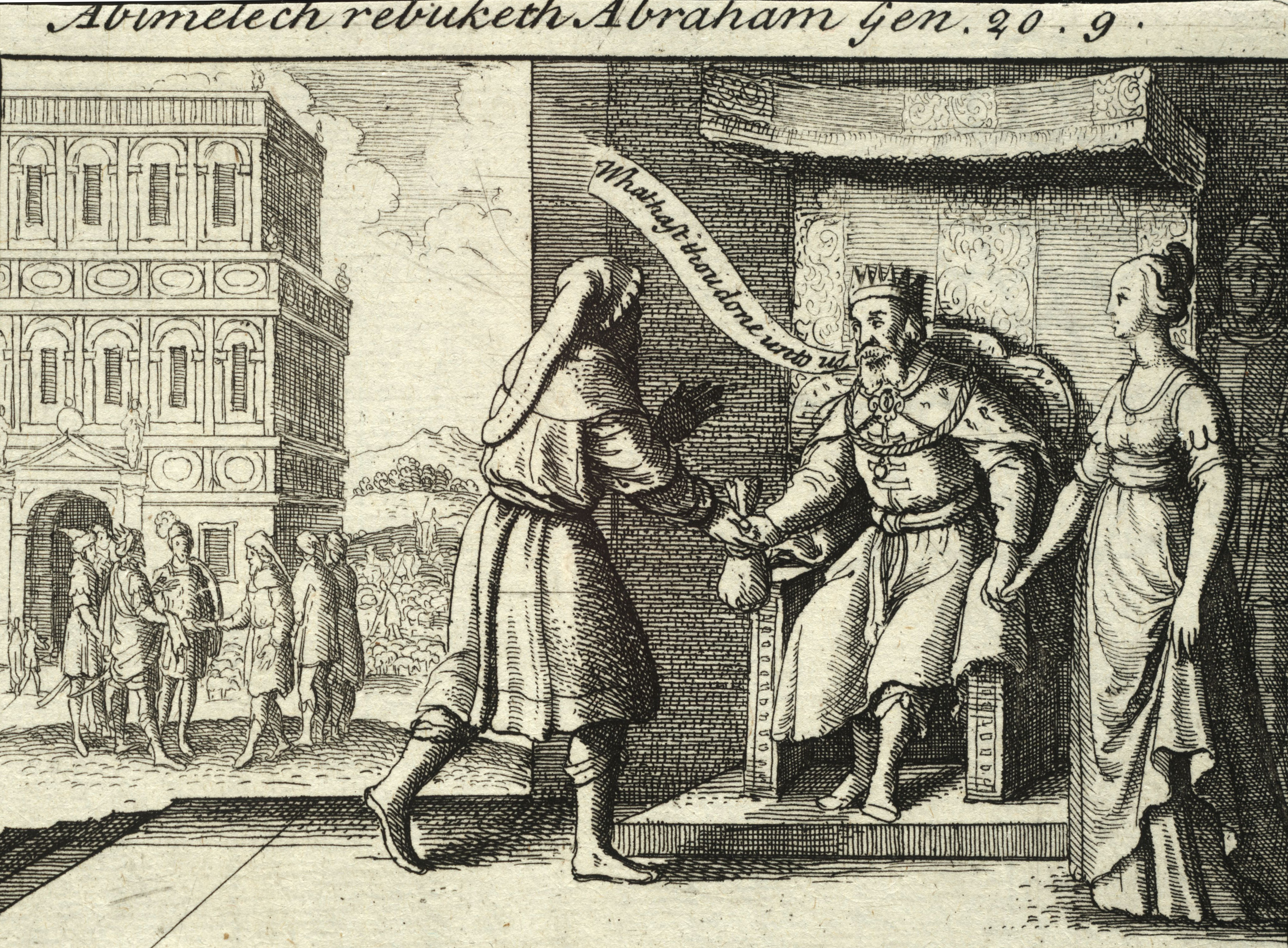
Abimelech rebuking Abraham

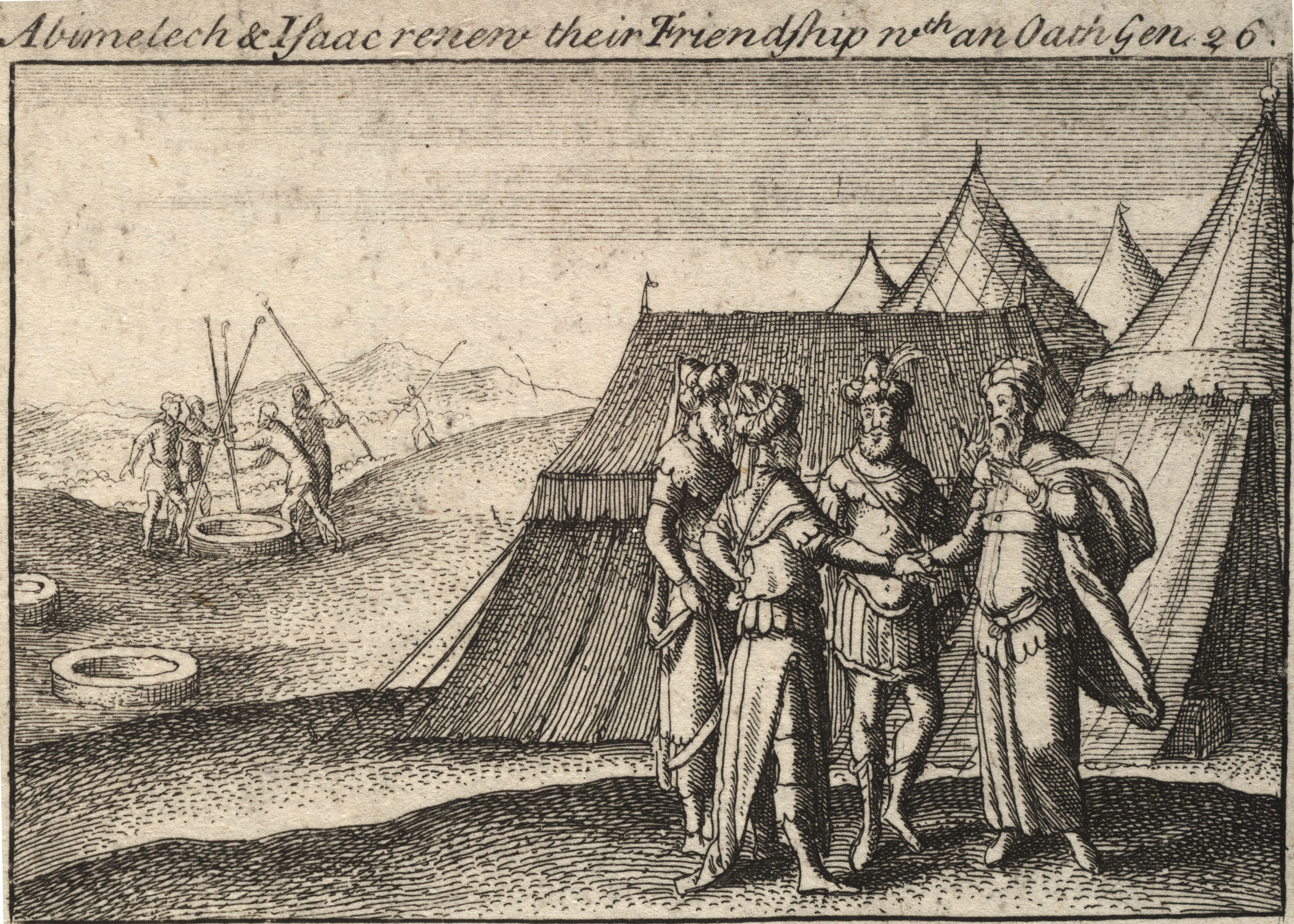
Isaac and Abimelech

Abimelech was most prominently the name of a polytheistic king of Gerar who is mentioned in two of the three wife–sister narratives in the Book of Genesis, in connection with both Abraham and Sarah, and with Isaac and Rebekah. Matthew Easton suggests that the king who met with Isaac and Rebekah was "probably" the son of the one who met with Abraham and Sarah.

In the Genesis 20 narrative, God (Elohim) appears to Abimelech in a night-time dream, revealing to him that Abraham and Sarah are a married couple, whereas in the Genesis 26 narrative, the king sees Isaac and Rebekah together and infers that they are married. Abimelech replies to God as LORD, and Abimelech can be seen as recognising the Noahide laws' ruling against adultery.

King Abimelech of Gerar also appears in an extra-biblical tradition recounted in texts such as the Arabic Apocalypse of Peter, the Cave of Treasures and the Conflict of Adam and Eve with Satan, as one of twelve regional kings in Abraham's time said to have built the city of Jerusalem for Melchizedek.

== Abimelech son of Jerubbaal/Gideon ==
The Book of Judges mentions Abimelech, son of judge Gideon (also known as Jerubbaal). According to the biblical narrative, Abimelech was an extremely conniving and evil person. He persuaded his mother's brothers to encourage the people of Shechem to back him in a plot to overthrow his family rule and make him sole ruler.

After slaying all but one of his seventy brothers, Abimelech was crowned king. The brother who escaped, Jotham, youngest son of Jerubbaal, made a pronouncement against Abimelech and those who had crowned him. The curse was that if they had not dealt righteously with the family of Jerrubaal, then fire would come against Abimelech from the people of Shechem and fire would come out of Abimelech against the people who had backed him in this bloody coup.

After Abimelech ruled for three years, the pronouncement came through. The people of Shechem set robbers to lie in wait of any goods or money headed to Abimelech and steal everything. Then Gaal son of Ebed went to Shechem and drunkenly bragged that he would remove Abimelech from the throne. Zebul, ruler of Shechem, sent word to Abimelech along with a battle strategy. Once Zebul taunted Gaal into fighting Abimelech, he shut Gaal and his brethren out of the city.

Abimelech then slew the field workers that came out of the city of Shechem the next day. When he heard that the people of Shechem had locked themselves in a strong tower, he and his men set fire to it, killing about a thousand men and women.

After this, Abimelech went to Thebez and camped against it. When he went close to the tower in Thebez to set it on fire, a woman dropped an upper millstone on Abimelech's head. He did not want to be known as having been killed by a woman, so he asked his armour bearer to run him through with a sword. His place of death is cited as being Thebez.

== Other biblical figures ==
Apart from the king (or kings) of Gerar, the Bible also records this name for:

- The father of Abiathar, and high priest in the time of David. In the parallel passage, the name is given as Ahimelech; most authorities consider this the more correct reading.
- The king of Gath better known as Achish, referred to as Abimelech or Achimelech in the title of Psalm 34.
- The husband of Naomi, and father of Mahlon and Chilion who leaves Bethlehem and dies in the land of Moab; in the Hebrew, his name is given as Elimelech, which is likely the correct reading.

== Other ancient sources ==
At the time of the Amarna tablets (mid-14th century BC), there was an Egyptian governor of Tyre named Abimilki, a cognate to Hebrew Abimelech (both mean "My Father is King"). He is sometimes speculated to be connected with one or more of the biblical Abimelechs.

== Russian use ==
Avimelekh (Russian: Авимеле́х) is a Russian male first name derived from Abimelech. It was included into various, often handwritten, church calendars throughout the 17th–19th centuries, but was omitted from the official Synodal Menologium at the end of the 19th century.

== Characters in the arts ==
Abimélech, Satrap of Gaza is a character baritone in Camille Saint-Saëns' opera Samson and Delilah.

== See also ==
- Abimelech (oratorio)
- Wife–sister narratives in the Book of Genesis
