= 1 Samuel 21 =

First Book of Samuel chapter

- ← chapter 20 chapter 22 →
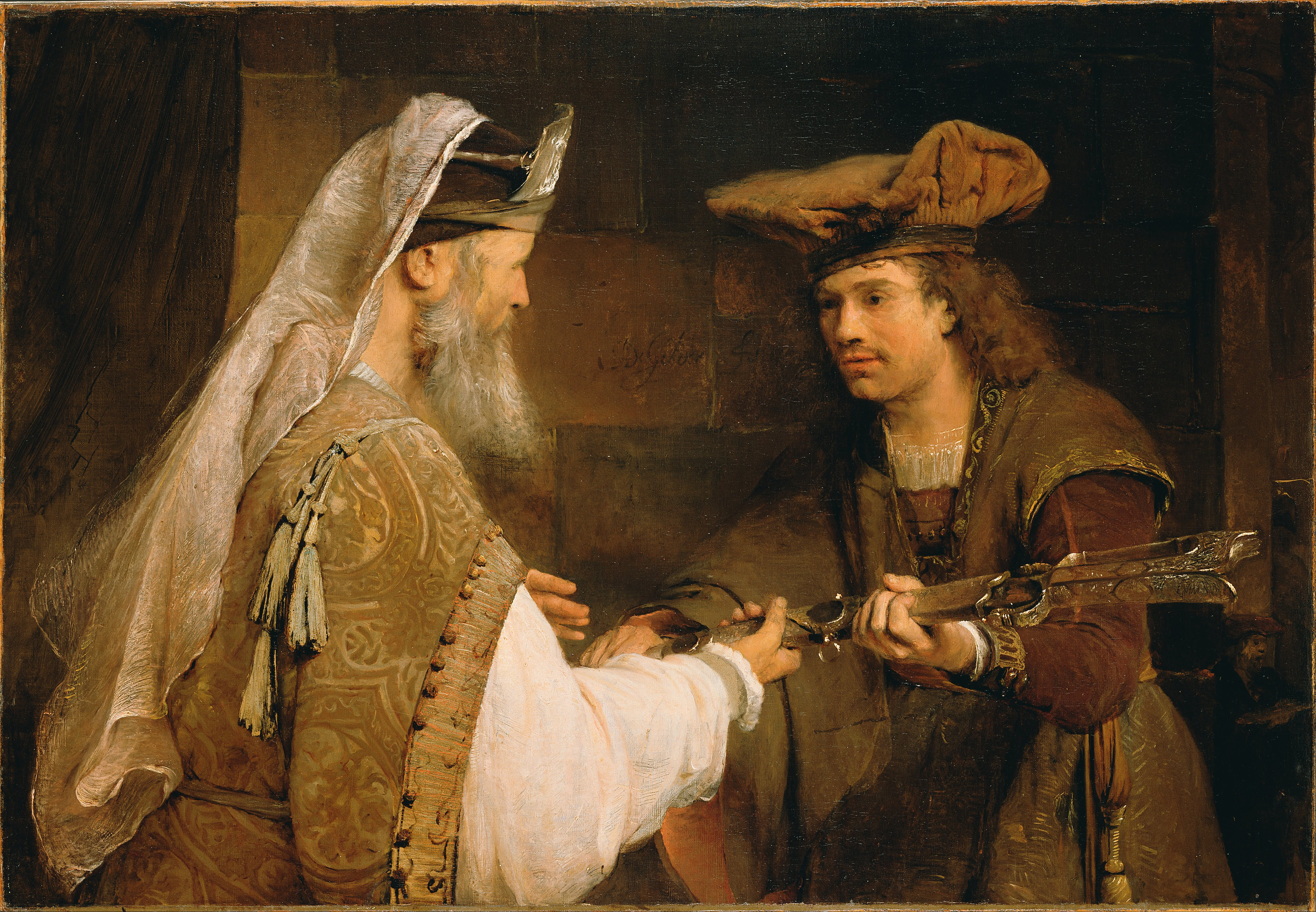
- "Ahimelech gives the sword of Goliath to David", painting by Arent de Gelder (1680s).
- Book: First book of Samuel
- Hebrew Bible part: Nevi'im
- Order in the Hebrew part: 3
- Category: Former Prophets
- Christian Bible part: Old Testament
- Order in the Christian part: 9

1 Samuel 21 is the twenty-first chapter of the First Book of Samuel in the Old Testament of the Christian Bible or the first part of the Books of Samuel in the Hebrew Bible. According to Jewish tradition, the book was attributed to the prophet Samuel, with additions by the prophets Gad and Nathan, but modern scholars view it as a composition of a number of independent texts of various ages dating to c. 630–540 BCE. This chapter contains the account of David's escape from Saul's repeated attempts to kill him. This is within a section comprising 1 Samuel 16 to 2 Samuel 5 which records the rise of David as the king of Israel.

== Text ==
This chapter was originally written in Biblical Hebrew. It is divided into 15 verses in English Bibles, but 16 verses in Hebrew Bible with different verse numbering.

=== Verse numbering ===
There are some differences in verse numbering of this chapter in English Bibles and Hebrew texts:

| English | Hebrew |
|---|---|
| 20:42b | 21:1 |
| 21:1–15 | 21:2–16 |

This article generally follows the common numbering in English Christian Bible versions, with notes to the numbering in Hebrew Bible versions.

=== Textual witnesses ===
Some early manuscripts containing the text of this chapter in Hebrew are of the Masoretic Textual tradition, which includes the Codex Cairensis (895), Aleppo Codex (10th century), and Codex Leningradensis (1008). Fragments containing parts of this chapter in Hebrew were found among the Dead Sea Scrolls including 4Q52 (4QSam^{b}; 250 BCE) with extant verses 1–3, 5–10.

Extant ancient manuscripts of a translation into Koine Greek known as the Septuagint (originally was made in the last few centuries BCE) include Codex Vaticanus (B; $\mathfrak{G}$^{B}; 4th century) and Codex Alexandrinus (A; $\mathfrak{G}$^{A}; 5th century). (Note: The whole book of 1 Samuel is missing from the extant Codex Sinaiticus.)

== Places ==
Places mentioned in this chapter
- Gath
- Nob
- Valley of Elah

== David in Nob (21:1–9) ==
David's visit in Nob (north of Jerusalem) is the first scene in a narrative of the priests providing support for David—not willingly like from Jonathan and Michal, but through deception—that continues with tragic consequences in 22:6–23. David's surprise visit was suspicious but quickly allayed by a concocted story of a secret mission. The priest at Nob, Ahimelech, the grandson of Eli, was persuaded to give provision to David and his men from "holy bread" or the "bread of Presence", which was reserved for priests (Leviticus 24:9), based on David's assurances that the men were "ceremonially clean" through abstention from sex and that their "vessels" (euphemism for "sexual organs") were clean. David also obtained Goliath's sword, which was "wrapped in cloth behind the ephod" (verse 9), a significant omen for future successes.

=== Verse 1 ===
Now David came to Nob, to Ahimelech the priest. And Ahimelech was afraid when he met David, and said to him, "Why are you alone, and no one is with you?"

- "Ahimelech the priest", either the same person as or the brother of Ahijah (1 Samuel 14:3), who was apparently dead at that time. Son of Ahitub.

=== Verse 7 ===
Now a certain man of the servants of Saul was there that day, detained before the LORD. And his name was Doeg the Edomite, the chief of the herdsmen who belonged to Saul.

The reference to Doeg the Edomite in this verse becomes meaningful in the next part of the plot (22:9–10,18), whose presence could also be related to the long-standing animosity between the people of Israel and Edom. His "detention" in the sanctuary was probably connected with an act of penance, or that he might be "cultically unclean".

== David in Gath (21:10–15) ==
David planned to take refuge in Gath but was recognized by the courtiers of Gath, who recited words specifically connected with his successes against the Philistines, perhaps because he was carrying Goliath's sword. Being outside YHWH's territory and within reach of the Philistines (maybe because he had not consulted YHWH before fleeing to Gath), David acted quickly to feign madness. Achish, the king of Gath, was deceived and immediately let David go.

=== Verse 11 ===
And the servants of Achish said to him, "Is this not David the king of the land? Did they not sing of him to one another in dances, saying: 'Saul has slain his thousands, and David his ten thousands'?"

- "Did they not sing": the chant cited in 1 Samuel 18:7 apparently had become a popular song.

== See also ==
- Ephod
- Edomite
- Goliath
- Herder
- Kohen
- Philistines
- Saul
- Related Bible parts: 1 Samuel 17, 1 Samuel 18, 1 Samuel 20

== Sources ==
=== Commentaries on Samuel ===
- Auld, Graeme (2003). "1 & 2 Samuel". In James D. G. Dunn and John William Rogerson (ed.). Eerdmans Commentary on the Bible. Eerdmans. ISBN 9780802837110.
- Bergen, David T. (1996). 1, 2 Samuel. B&H Publishing Group. ISBN 9780805401073.
- Chapman, Stephen B. (2016). 1 Samuel as Christian Scripture: A Theological Commentary. Wm. B. Eerdmans Publishing Company. ISBN 978-1467445160.
- Evans, Paul (2018). Longman, Tremper (ed.). 1-2 Samuel. The Story of God Bible Commentary. Zondervan Academic. ISBN 978-0310490944.
- Gordon, Robert (1986). I & II Samuel, A Commentary. Paternoster Press. ISBN 9780310230229.
- Hertzberg, Hans Wilhelm (1964). I & II Samuel, A Commentary (trans. from German 2nd edition 1960 ed.). Westminster John Knox Press. p. 19. ISBN 978-0664223182.
- Tsumura, David Toshio (2007). The First Book of Samuel. Eerdmans. ISBN 9780802823595.

=== General ===
- Breytenbach, Andries (2000). "Who Is Behind The Samuel Narrative?". In Johannes Cornelis de Moor and H.F. Van Rooy (ed.). Past, Present, Future: the Deuteronomistic History and the Prophets. Brill. ISBN 9789004118713.
- Coogan, Michael David (2007). Coogan, Michael David; Brettler, Marc Zvi; Newsom, Carol Ann; Perkins, Pheme (eds.). The New Oxford Annotated Bible with the Apocryphal/Deuterocanonical Books: New Revised Standard Version, Issue 48 (Augmented 3rd ed.). Oxford University Press. ISBN 978-0195288810.
- Fitzmyer, Joseph A. (2008). A Guide to the Dead Sea Scrolls and Related Literature. Grand Rapids, MI: William B. Eerdmans Publishing Company. ISBN 9780802862419.
- Halley, Henry H. (1965). Halley's Bible Handbook: an abbreviated Bible commentary (24th (revised) ed.). Zondervan Publishing House. ISBN 0-310-25720-4.
- Hayes, Christine (2015). Introduction to the Bible. Yale University Press. ISBN 978-0300188271.
- Jones, Gwilym H. (2007). "12. 1 and 2 Samuel". In Barton, John; Muddiman, John (eds.). The Oxford Bible Commentary (first (paperback) ed.). Oxford University Press. pp. 196–232. ISBN 978-0199277186.
- Klein, R.W. (2003). "Samuel, books of". In Bromiley, Geoffrey W (ed.). The International Standard Bible Encyclopedia. Eerdmans. ISBN 9780802837844.
- Knight, Douglas A (1995). "Chapter 4 Deuteronomy and the Deuteronomists". In James Luther Mays, David L. Petersen and Kent Harold Richards (ed.). Old Testament Interpretation. T&T Clark. ISBN 9780567292896.
- Ulrich, Eugene, ed. (2010). The Biblical Qumran Scrolls: Transcriptions and Textual Variants. Brill.
- Würthwein, Ernst (1995). The Text of the Old Testament. Translated by Rhodes, Erroll F. Grand Rapids, MI: Wm. B. Eerdmans. ISBN 0-8028-0788-7.
