= Nob, Israel =

Town featured in the Bible

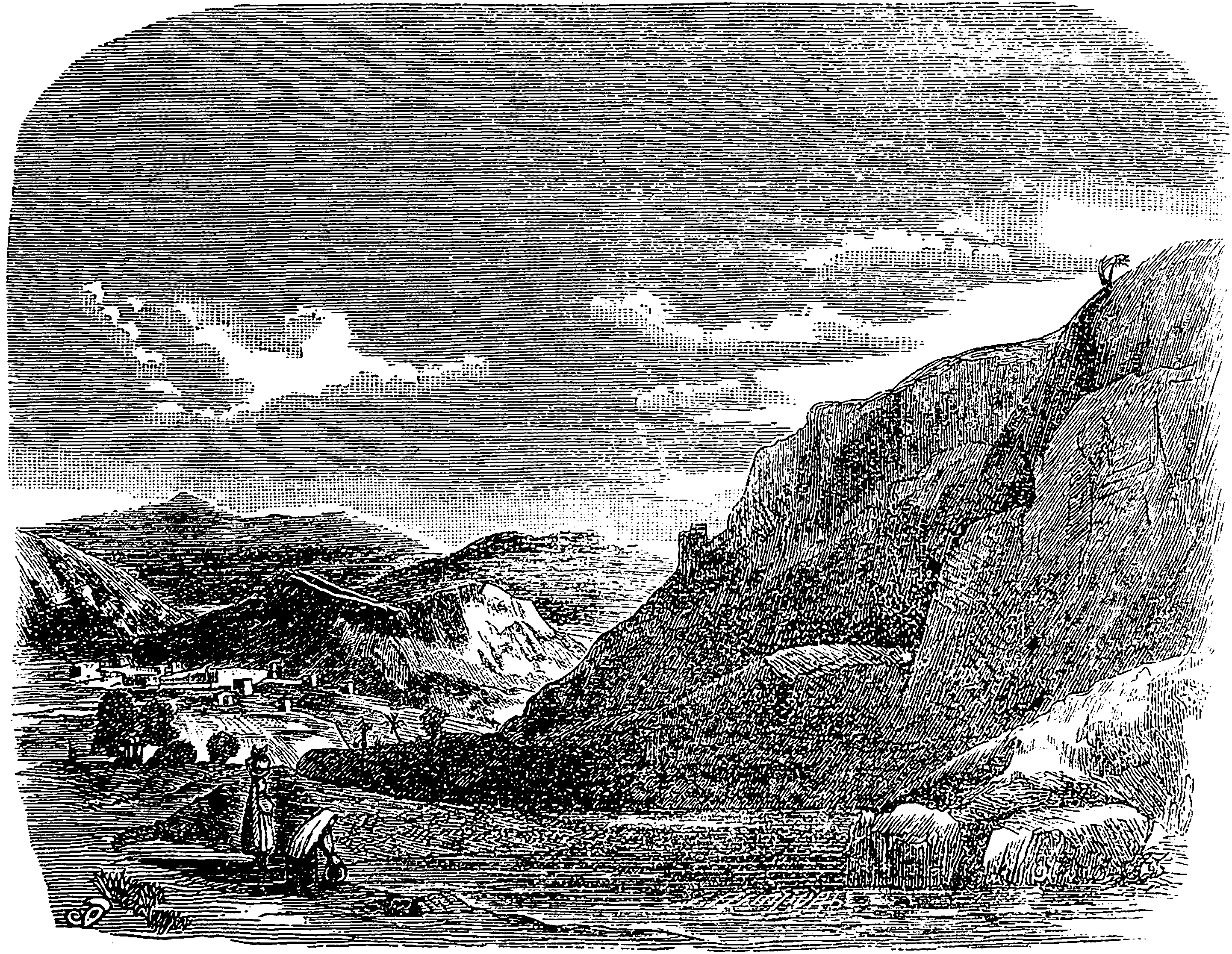
Nob, Israel

Nob was a priestly town in ancient Israel whose remains are in Jerusalem, Israel. The town is mostly known as the site of a massacre described in the Hebrew Bible in 1 Samuel 21 and 22, where the town's kohenim are massacred by Doeg the Edomite, who acted on orders from Saul, ruler of the Unified Kingdom of Israel.

== Location ==
The town is situated in the southern portion of the land associated with the tribe of Benjamin, and is identified within the village of Shuafat, to the north of Jerusalem.

Historical geographers largely identify the site as Bayt Nuba. It likely belonged to the tribe of Benjamin, Jerusalem being at the border between the tribes of Benjamin and Judah.

== In the Bible ==
The town is known for its mention in Samuel 21 and 22 as the site of a massacre of the kohenim, the Israelite priesthood. The general reading of the incident follows that David visits Nob while being pursued by Saul. David deceives the high priest Ahimelech, who replies in innocence to Saul's interrogation. Saul then orders Doeg the Edomite to execute the priests in Nob. One interpretation follows that David was seeking the support of the ecclesiastical establishment as the nation's only counter-authority to the state. This reading of the text follows that since Nob was a city of priests, it would be an unlikely place for David to seek food and weapons in his flight from Saul. Priests may not be expected to have arms, and the food locals might bring them as offerings is ritually permitted only to priests and their families, designated as the terumah. For this reason, some commentaries note that David eats the showbread, which is more sacred than the priestly food, but is not terumah. Others interpret the story of David's arrival in Nob as an intentional act to eat the sacred showbread and to retrieve Goliath’s sword, which was kept in Nob. These acts are performed to downplay the prestige of Saul. An alternate reading suggests that Ahimelech knowingly colluded with David.

Aside from the incident in the Book of Samuel, the town of Nob is mentioned in the Bible in connection with the Neo-Assyrian attack on Israel described in Isaiah 10:32 and concerning the Samarian settlements after the Babylonian captivity listed in Nehemiah 11:33.

In the Liber Antiquitatum Biblicarum known as Pseudo-Philo, a first-century work, the town of Nob is identified as the actual location for the biblical incident of the Levite's concubine, which takes place in the territory of the tribe of Benjamin.

== See also ==
- Shiloh (biblical city)
