= Abiathar =

Biblical character

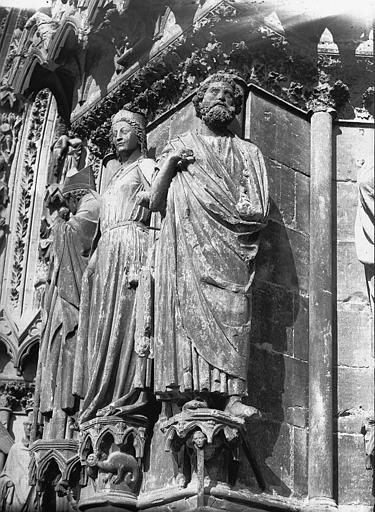
Statue of Abiathar (next to the Queen of Sheba) at Reims Cathedral.

Abiathar (Hebrew: אֶבְיָתָר ʾEḇyāṯār, "father (of) abundance"/"abundant father"), in the Hebrew Bible, is a son of Ahimelech or Ahijah, High Priest at Nob, the fourth in descent from Eli and the last of Eli's House to be a High Priest.

== Bible account ==
1 Samuel and 2 Samuel mention Abiathar several times.

According to these books, Abiathar was the only one of the priests to escape from Saul's (reigned c. 1020–1000 BCE) massacre in Nob, when his father and the priests of Nob were slain on the command of Saul. He fled to David (reigned c. 1003–970 BCE) at Keilah, taking with him the ephod and other priestly regalia. In rabbinical literature that links the later extermination of David's male descendants with that of the priests of Nob, the survival of David's descendant Joash is connected to that of Abiathar.

The Biblical account says Abiathar joined David, who was then in the cave of Adullam. He remained with David, and became priest of the party of which he was the leader. He was of great service to David, especially at the time of the rebellion of Absalom. When David ascended the throne of Judah, Abiathar was appointed High Priest and the "king's counselor". Meanwhile, Zadok, of the house of Eleazar, had been made High Priest. Another version says he was Co-Pontiff with Zadok during King David. These appointments continued in force until the end of David's reign. In 1 Kings 4:4, Zadok and Abiathar are found acting together as priests under Solomon.

The text goes on to say that Abiathar was deposed (the sole historical instance of the deposition of a high priest) and banished to his home at Anathoth by Solomon, because he took part in the attempt to raise Adonijah to the throne instead of Solomon. The priesthood thus passed from the house of Ithamar to the house of Eleazar.

== In rabbinic literature ==
The rescue of the chief priest Abiathar, in the massacre of the priests of Nob ordered by Saul, was fortunate for the house of David; for if he had lost his life, David's descendants would through divine retaliation have been entirely wiped out of existence at the hands of Athaliah. It was David's acts that had really brought about the death of the priests, and to make amends he appointed Abiathar high priest. Abiathar retained the office until he was deserted by the Holy Spirit, without which the high priest could not successfully consult the Urim and Thummim. When David, on his flight from Absalom, recognized this loss in Abiathar, he felt compelled to put Zadok in his place. Abiathar's removal from the Priesthood fulfilled that other part of the curse on the House of Eli—that the Priesthood would pass out of the House of Eli.

== Confusion of the name ==
In 2 Samuel 8:17 Ahimelech, the son of Abiathar is suggested to be read, with the Syriac, for Abiathar, the son of Ahimelech.

A similar confusion occurs in Gospel of Mark: in reporting Jesus' words, the evangelist used the name Abiathar when we might expect to see Jesus mention his father Ahimelech. Suggestions made to resolve the difficulty — e.g. that father and son each bore the same double name, or that Abiathar officiated during his father's lifetime and in his father's stead—have been supported by some scholars, but have not been fully accepted.

Israelite religious titles
| Preceded by Ahimelech | High Priest of Israel | Succeeded by Zadok |
