= Ahimelech =

Biblical character

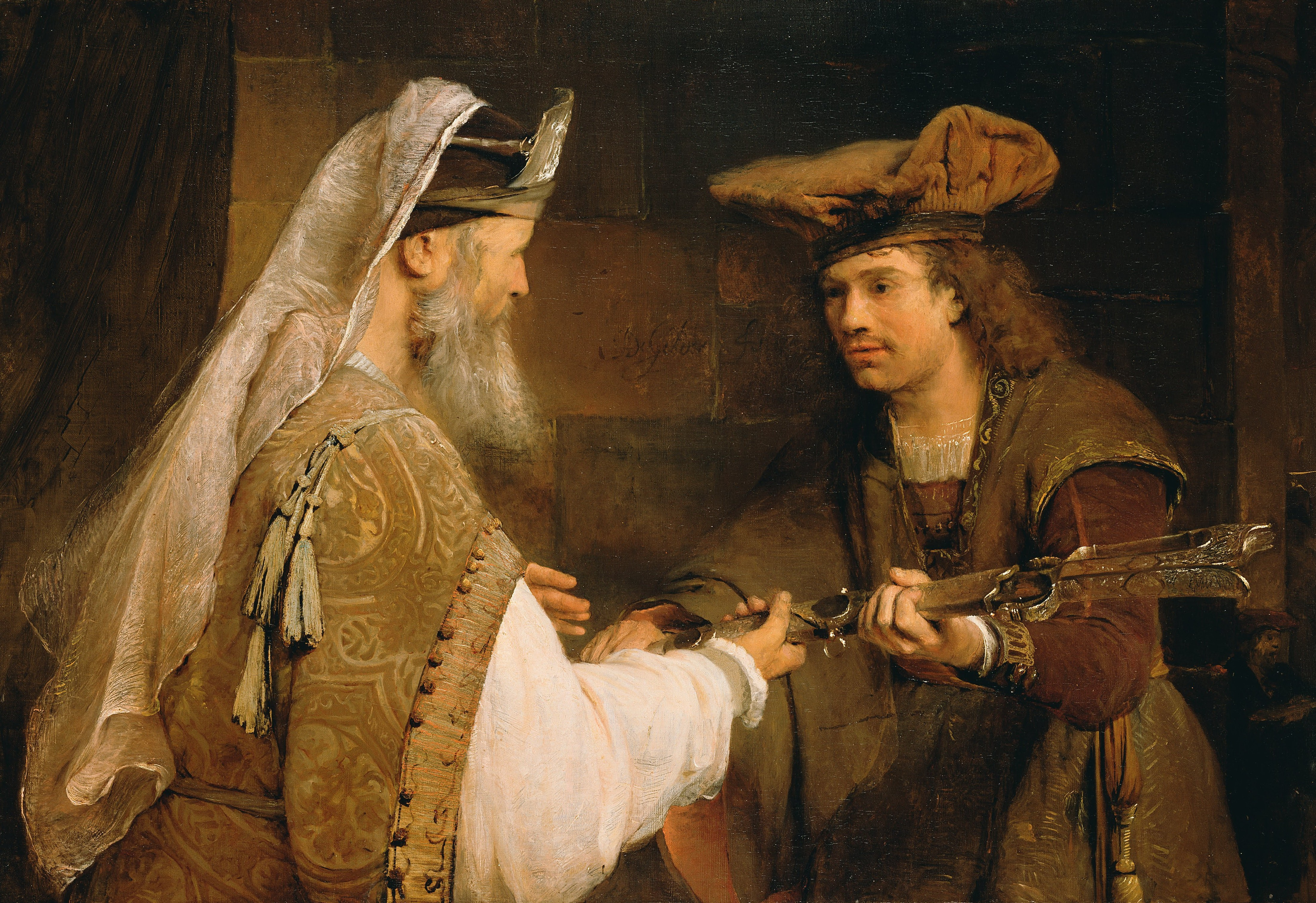
- Ahimelech giving the sword of Goliath to David, by Aert de Gelder
- Born: אֲחִימֶלֶך ʾĂḥīmeleḵ, "my brother is king"/"brother of a king"
- Occupation: grand priest of the town of Nob

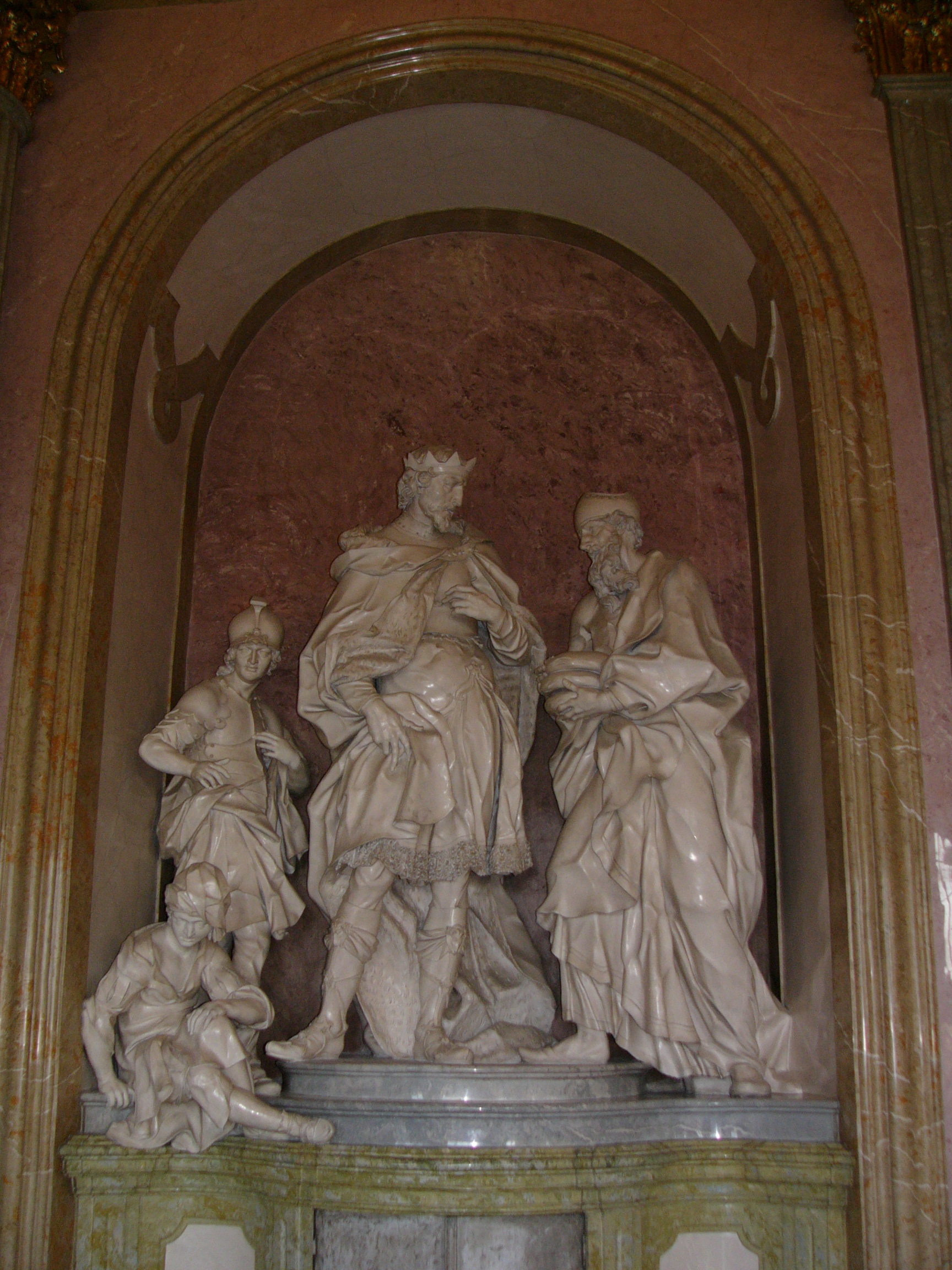
Statuary David receives sacral bread from the priest Ahimelech in Ceremonial Hall in Hradisko Monastery in Olomouc (Czech Republic) created by Josef Winterhalder the Elder in 1734.

Ahimelech (Hebrew: אֲחִימֶלֶך ʾĂḥīmeleḵ, "brother of a king") was an Israelite priest and served as the grand priest of the town of Nob. In the Book of Samuel, he was described as the son of Ahitub and father of Abiathar (1 Samuel 22:20–23), but described as the son of Abiathar in 2 Samuel 8:17 and in four places in 1 Chronicles. He descended from Aaron's son Ithamar and the High Priest of Israel Eli. In 1 Chronicles 18:16 his name is Abimelech according to the Masoretic Text, and is probably the same as Ahiah (1 Samuel 14:3, 18).

== Relation to David ==
He was the twelfth High Priest, and officiated at Nob, where he was visited by David (he gave David and his companions five loaves of the showbread) when David fled from Saul (1 Samuel 21:1–9). He was summoned into Saul's presence, and accused of disloyalty for assisting David, on the information of Doeg the Edomite. Then the king commanded that he, with the other priests who stood beside him, 86 in all, should be slain with his family. This sentence was carried into execution by Doeg in a cruel manner (1 Samuel 22:9–23). Possibly Abiathar had a son also called Ahimelech, or the two names, as some think, may have been accidentally transposed in 2 Samuel 8:17; 1 Chronicles 18:16, marg.; 24:3, 6, 31.

== Interpretation ==
Ahimelech's death was seen as a partial fulfilment of the curse on the House of Eli – that none of Eli's male descendants would live to old age; the other part of the curse on the House of Eli – that the priesthood would pass out of his descendants (1 Samuel 2:27–36)– was fulfilled when Abiathar was deposed from the office of High Priest. Rabbinical literature linked the extermination of the male descendants of David with the extermination of the priests of Nob by Saul - deeming it divine retribution because David's action had provoked Saul's outburst - and also linked the survival of David's descendant Joash with that of Ahimelech's son Abiathar.

== See also ==
- Levite
- List of High Priests of Israel

Israelite religious titles
Preceded by Ahijah	High Priest of Israel	Succeeded by Abiathar
