= 2 Samuel 2 =

Second Book of Samuel chapter

- ← chapter 1 chapter 3 →
- The pages containing the Books of Samuel (1 & 2 Samuel) Leningrad Codex (1008 CE).
- Book: First book of Samuel
- Hebrew Bible part: Nevi'im
- Order in the Hebrew part: 3
- Category: Former Prophets
- Christian Bible part: Old Testament
- Order in the Christian part: 10

2 Samuel 2 is the second chapter of the Second Book of Samuel in the Old Testament of the Christian Bible or the second part of Books of Samuel in the Hebrew Bible. Jewish tradition attributes the book to the prophet Samuel, with later additions by the prophets Gad and Nathan; modern scholarship, however, regards it as a compilation of independent texts dated to c. 630–540 BCE. This chapter contains the account of David becoming ruler of the nascent Kingdom of Judah in Hebron. This is within a section covering 1 Samuel 16 to 2 Samuel 5, which documents the rise of David as the new king of Israel, and a section covering this chapter to 2 Samuel 8 that discusses the period when David established his kingdom.

== Text ==
This chapter was originally written in Biblical Hebrew. It is divided into 32 verses.

=== Textual witnesses ===
Some early manuscripts containing the text of this chapter in Biblical Hebrew are of the Masoretic Textual tradition, which includes the Codex Cairensis (895), Aleppo Codex (10th century), and Codex Leningradensis (1008). Fragments containing parts of this chapter in Biblical Hebrew were found among the Dead Sea Scrolls, including 4Q51 (4QSam^{a}; 100–50 BCE) with extant verses 5–16, 25–27, and 29–32.

Extant ancient manuscripts of a translation into Koine Greek known as the Septuagint (originally was made in the last few centuries BCE) include Codex Vaticanus (B; $\mathfrak{G}$^{B}; 4th century) and Codex Alexandrinus (A; $\mathfrak{G}$^{A}; 5th century). (Note: The whole book of 2 Samuel is missing from the extant Codex Sinaiticus.)

== Places ==
Places mentioned in this chapter
- Bethlehem
- Giah
- Gibeon
- Gilead
- Hebron
- Jabesh-Gilead
- Mahanaim

== Analysis ==
The narrative of David's reign in Hebron in 2 Samuel 1:1–5:5 has the following structure:

A. Looking back to the final scenes of 1 Samuel (1:1)

B. David receives Saul's crown (1:2-12)

C. David executes Saul's killer (1:13-16)

D. David's lament for Saul and Jonathan (1:17-27)

E. Two kings in the land (2:1-3:6)
E'. One king in the land: Abner switches sides (3:7-27)

D'. David's lament for Abner (3:28-39)

C'. David executes Ishbaal's killers (4:1-12)

B'. David wears Saul's crown (5:1-3)

A'. Looking forward to David's reign in Jerusalem (5:4-5)

David's narrative of his ascension to the throne in Hebron is framed by an opening verse that looks backward to the final chapters of 1 Samuel (Saul's death and David's refuge in Ziklag) and closing verses that look forward to David's rule in Jerusalem (2 Samuel 5). The action begins when David received Saul's crown and concludes when he was finally able to wear that crown. David executes the Amalekite who claims to have assisted Saul with his suicide and those who murdered Ishbaal. Two laments were recorded: one for Saul and Jonathan and another shorter one for Abner. At the center are the two key episodes: the existence of two kings in the land (David and Ishbaal), because Joab's forces could not conquer Saul's territory on the battlefield. However, this was resolved when Ishbaal foolishly challenged Abner's loyalty, causing Abner to switch sides that eventually brought Saul's kingdom under Davidic rule.

== David anointed king of Judah in Hebron (2:1–7) ==
David began his move with an enquiry to God and obeyed God's instruction to reside in Hebron, where David had obtained a power-base by his marriage to Abigail, the widow of Nabal (1 Samuel 25:3) and had sent gifts to its inhabitants from the spoils after his victory over the Amalekites (1 Samuel 30:31). It was also in Hebron, apparently the main town in the region, that David was 'anointed king over Judah' (verse 4), as a confirmation of the previous anointing by Samuel (1 Samuel 16:13), this time by 'the people of Judah', and later also by 'the elders of Israel' (2 Samuel 5:3). David had additionally secured support in northern areas with the marriages to Ahinoam of Jezreel and then to Maacah, daughter of Talmai of Geshur. David's overtures to the men of Jabesh-gilead, who had been loyal to Saul (verses 4b-7), were aimed to establish a relationship with that area, replacing to the one that ended with the death of Saul.

=== Verse 4 ===
Then the men of Judah came, and there they anointed David king over the house of Judah.
And they told David, saying, "The men of Jabesh Gilead were the ones who buried Saul."

- "The men of Judah": referring to an assembly of elders from David's own tribe, whom he had previously secured the support (1 Samuel 30:26).

== Ish-bosheth made king of Israel in Mahanaim (2:8–11) ==
David's move was obviously a direct challenge to the house of Saul, which still had special ties with Gilead, Jezreel, and Geshur, together with other northern territories. Abner, Saul's cousin, made "Ishbaal" (a reading in the Greek versions, for the Hebrew "Ishbosheth", 'man of shame'), Saul's remaining son, to be the king of Israel in Mahanaim (in the area of Gilead), which is east of the Jordan river, because the Philistines controlled the territory west of the Jordan, so the list of Ishbaal's domain was considered idealistic.

=== Verse 10 ===
Ish-bosheth, Saul’s son, was forty years old when he began to reign over Israel, and he reigned two years. But the house of Judah followed David.

- "Ish-bosheth": written as "Ishbaal" in Greek versions here and verse 8, or "Esh-Baal" in 1 Chronicles 8:33 and 9:39.

== Battle of Gibeon (2:12–32) ==
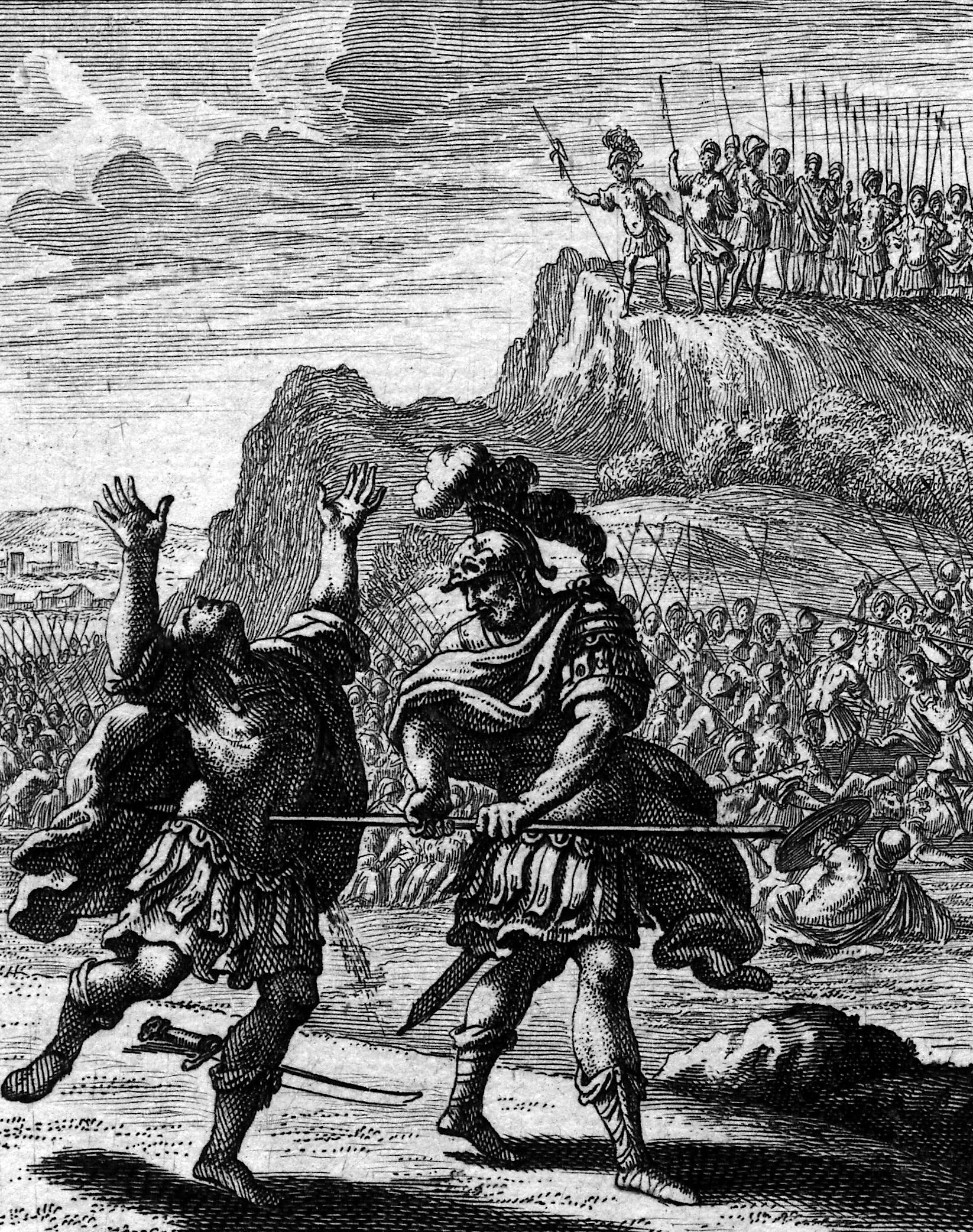
Woodcut of Abner killing Asahel, by Johann Christoph Weigel, 1695

Inevitably a civil war broke out between Israel and Judah, as both armies faced off Gibeon. First, Abner suggested a contest between twelve young men from each side, but the result was inconclusive as all contestants were killed (verse 16). The subsequent more general battle was to David's advantage as the Saulide army was forced to retreat (verse 17) with a significant incident that Asahel, the youngest brother of Joab and Abishai, the sons of Zeruiah (a sister of David; 1 Chronicles 2:16), was killed by Abner for not willing to stop pursuing him. Joab and Abishai's continuing pursuit that was halted when Abner reminded the people of 'their bond of kinship' (verse 26), so the hostilities, even with obvious advantage for David's side (verse 31), ceased, and the armies returned to their bases. Nonetheless, Joab was determined to avenge Asahel's death (3:17), when the opportunity came and David felt unable to restrain the violence of the sons of Zeruiah (3:39).

=== Verse 18 ===
Now the three sons of Zeruiah were there: Joab and Abishai and Asahel. And Asahel was as fleet of foot as a wild gazelle.

- "Abishai": had one time accompanied David to Saul's camp (1 Samuel 26:6-22) and later became joint military leader with Joab, his brother.

== See also ==
- Ammah
- Bithron
- Ashurites
- Carmelite
- Israel
- Jezreelite
- Helkathhazzurim
- Ner
- Shofar
- Tribe of Benjamin
- Tribe of Ephraim
- Tribe of Judah
- Related Bible parts: 1 Samuel 25, 1 Samuel 31, 2 Samuel 1, 1 Chronicles 2, 1 Chronicles 3

== Sources ==
=== Commentaries on Samuel ===
- Auld, Graeme (2003). "1 & 2 Samuel". In James D. G. Dunn and John William Rogerson (ed.). Eerdmans Commentary on the Bible. Eerdmans. ISBN 9780802837110.
- Bergen, David T. (1996). 1, 2 Samuel. B&H Publishing Group. ISBN 9780805401073.
- Chapman, Stephen B. (2016). 1 Samuel as Christian Scripture: A Theological Commentary. Wm. B. Eerdmans Publishing Company. ISBN 978-1467445160.
- Collins, John J. (2014). "Chapter 14: 1 Samuel 12 – 2 Samuel 25". Introduction to the Hebrew Scriptures. Fortress Press. pp. 277–296. ISBN 978-1451469233.
- Evans, Paul (2018). Longman, Tremper (ed.). 1-2 Samuel. The Story of God Bible Commentary. Zondervan Academic. ISBN 978-0310490944.
- Gordon, Robert (1986). I & II Samuel, A Commentary. Paternoster Press. ISBN 9780310230229.
- Hertzberg, Hans Wilhelm (1964). I & II Samuel, A Commentary (trans. from German 2nd edition 1960 ed.). Westminster John Knox Press. p. 19. ISBN 978-0664223182.
- Morrison, Craig E. (2013). Berit Olam: 2 Samuel. Liturgical Press. ISBN 978-0814682913.

=== General ===
- Breytenbach, Andries (2000). "Who Is Behind The Samuel Narrative?". In Johannes Cornelis de Moor and H.F. Van Rooy (ed.). Past, Present, Future: the Deuteronomistic History and the Prophets. Brill. ISBN 9789004118713.
- Coogan, Michael David (2007). Coogan, Michael David; Brettler, Marc Zvi; Newsom, Carol Ann; Perkins, Pheme (eds.). The New Oxford Annotated Bible with the Apocryphal/Deuterocanonical Books: New Revised Standard Version, Issue 48 (Augmented 3rd ed.). Oxford University Press. ISBN 978-0195288810.
- Fitzmyer, Joseph A. (2008). A Guide to the Dead Sea Scrolls and Related Literature. Grand Rapids, MI: William B. Eerdmans Publishing Company. ISBN 9780802862419.
- Halley, Henry H. (1965). Halley's Bible Handbook: an abbreviated Bible commentary (24th (revised) ed.). Zondervan Publishing House. ISBN 0-310-25720-4.
- Hayes, Christine (2015). Introduction to the Bible. Yale University Press. ISBN 978-0300188271.
- Jones, Gwilym H. (2007). "12. 1 and 2 Samuel". In Barton, John; Muddiman, John (eds.). The Oxford Bible Commentary (first (paperback) ed.). Oxford University Press. pp. 196–232. ISBN 978-0199277186.
- Klein, R.W. (2003). "Samuel, books of". In Bromiley, Geoffrey W (ed.). The International Standard Bible Encyclopedia. Eerdmans. ISBN 9780802837844.
- Knight, Douglas A (1995). "Chapter 4 Deuteronomy and the Deuteronomists". In James Luther Mays, David L. Petersen and Kent Harold Richards (ed.). Old Testament Interpretation. T&T Clark. ISBN 9780567292896.
- McKane, William (1993). "Samuel, Book of". In Metzger, Bruce M; Coogan, Michael D (eds.). The Oxford Companion to the Bible. Oxford University Press. pp. 409–413. ISBN 978-0195046458.
- Ulrich, Eugene, ed. (2010). The Biblical Qumran Scrolls: Transcriptions and Textual Variants. Brill.
- Würthwein, Ernst (1995). The Text of the Old Testament. Translated by Rhodes, Erroll F. Grand Rapids, MI: Wm. B. Eerdmans. ISBN 0-8028-0788-7.
