= 2 Samuel 3 =

Second Book of Samuel chapter

- ← chapter 2 chapter 4 →
- The pages containing the Books of Samuel (1 & 2 Samuel) Leningrad Codex (1008 CE).
- Book: First book of Samuel
- Hebrew Bible part: Nevi'im
- Order in the Hebrew part: 3
- Category: Former Prophets
- Christian Bible part: Old Testament
- Order in the Christian part: 10

2 Samuel 3 is the third chapter of the Second Book of Samuel in the Old Testament of the Christian Bible or the second part of Books of Samuel in the Hebrew Bible. Jewish tradition attributes the book to the prophet Samuel, with later additions by the prophets Gad and Nathan; modern scholarship, however, regards it as a compilation of independent texts dated to c. 630–540 BCE. This chapter contains the account of David's reign in Hebron. This section includes 1 Samuel 16 to 2 Samuel 5, which records the rise of David as the king of Israel, as well as a section covering 2 Samuel 2–8, focusing on the period when David established his kingdom.

== Text ==
This chapter was originally written in the Hebrew language. It is divided into 39 verses.

=== Textual witnesses ===
Some early manuscripts containing the text of this chapter in Hebrew are of the Masoretic Text tradition, which includes the Codex Cairensis (895), Aleppo Codex (10th century), and Codex Leningradensis (1008). Fragments containing parts of this chapter in Hebrew were found among the Dead Sea Scrolls including 4Q51 (4QSam^{a}; 100–50 BCE) with extant verses 1–15, 17, 21, 23–25, 27–39.

Extant ancient manuscripts of a translation into Koine Greek known as the Septuagint (originally was made in the last few centuries BCE) include Codex Vaticanus (B; $\mathfrak{G}$^{B}; 4th century) and Codex Alexandrinus (A; $\mathfrak{G}$^{A}; 5th century). (Note: The whole book of 2 Samuel is missing from the extant Codex Sinaiticus.)

=== Old Testament references ===
- 2 Samuel 3:1–5: 1 Chronicles 3:1–9

== Places ==
Places mentioned in this chapter
- Bahurim
- Beersheba
- Dan
- Geshur
- Gibeon
- Hebron

== Analysis ==
The narrative of David's reign in Hebron in 2 Samuel 1:1–5:5 has the following structure:

A. Looking back to the final scenes of 1 Samuel (1:1)

B. David receives Saul's crown (1:2-12)

C. David executes Saul's killer (1:13-16)

D. David's lament for Saul and Jonathan (1:17-27)

E. Two kings in the land (2:1-3:6)
E'. One king in the land: Abner switches sides (3:7-27)

D'. David's lament for Abner (3:28-39)

C'. David executes Ishbaal's killers (4:1-12)

B'. David wears Saul's crown (5:1-3)

A'. Looking forward to David's reign in Jerusalem (5:4-5)

David's narrative of his ascension to the throne in Hebron is framed by an opening verse that looks backward to the final chapters of 1 Samuel (Saul's death and David's refuge in Ziklag) and closing verses that look forward to David's rule in Jerusalem (2 Samuel 5). The action begins when David received Saul's crown and concludes when he was finally able to wear that crown. David executes the Amalekite who claims to have assisted Saul with his suicide and those who murdered Ishbaal. Two laments were recorded: one for Saul and Jonathan and another shorter one for Abner. At the center are the two key episodes: the existence of two kings in the land (David and Ishbaal), because Joab's forces could not conquer Saul's territory on the battlefield. However, this was resolved when Ishbaal foolishly challenged Abner's loyalty, causing Abner to switch sides that eventually brought Saul's kingdom under Davidic rule.

== The House of David strengthened (3:1–5) ==
After the temporarily suspended hostility (2 Samuel 2:28), the struggle between the houses of David and Saul continued for around two years (2 Samuel 2:10), but throughout the period of time, David became stronger (verse 1; a continuing theme of 2 Samuel 2:30–31), as demonstrated by the list of sons born to him at Hebron (verses 2–5).

=== Verse 1 ===
Now there was a long war between the house of Saul and the house of David. But David grew stronger and stronger, and the house of Saul grew weaker and weaker.

- "Long war": although Ish-bosheth might be too weak to carry on the war, David apparently waited with firm reliance on God's promise until all Israel came over to him.

== Abner joins David (3:6–21) ==
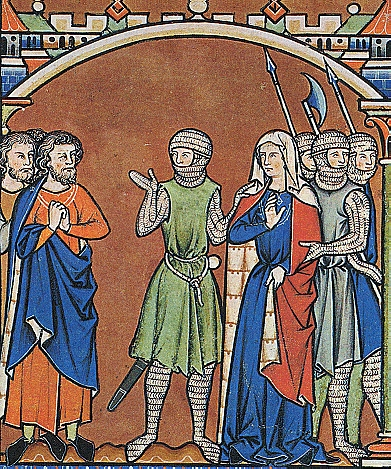
Illustration from the Morgan Bible of Abner (in green) taking Michal away from Paltiel.

Ish-bosheth's quarrel with Abner was concerning his alleged relationship with, Rizpah, one of Saul's concubines and the mother of two of his sons (2 Samuel 21:8). With his stature in court increasing, Abner's action could be perceived as an open bid for Ishbaal's throne (cf. 1 Kings 2:13–25, where Adonijah made a similar bid on Abishag, David's concubine, for Solomon's throne and 2 Samuel 16:20–23, where Absalom openly visited David's harem). Abner replied to the accusation angrily and defiantly, without admitting that he was in the wrong, but dismissed the affair as insignificant in comparison with the loyalty he has shown to the house of Saul (verse 8). After this, Abner sent a message to David at Hebron, seeking a pact (a 'covenant') that would transfer Israelite territories (now under Ishbaal) to David. David set his own conditions: the return of Michal, Saul's daughter, with political implications of David legality to claim Saul's throne. As Michal was forced to marry another man, the prohibition of remarriage in Deuteronomy 24:1–4 does not apply here, and for this reason (and Abner's influence in court), Ish-bosheth complied with David's request (verses 15–16). Abner successfully negotiated with both sides: senior leaders of Israel, who were dissatisfied with Ishbaal and hoped to withstand the Philistines with David as happened in the past, as well as the support of Saul's tribe and his own, the Benjaminites. His successes led to a big feast with David, probably on the occasion of sealing the covenant.

=== Verse 17 ===
And Abner conferred with the elders of Israel, saying, "For some time past you have been seeking David as king over you."

- "Conferred": from Hebrew: "the word of Abner was with"
- "Elders of Israel": that is, the leaders of the tribes of Israel.

== Death of Abner (3:22–39) ==
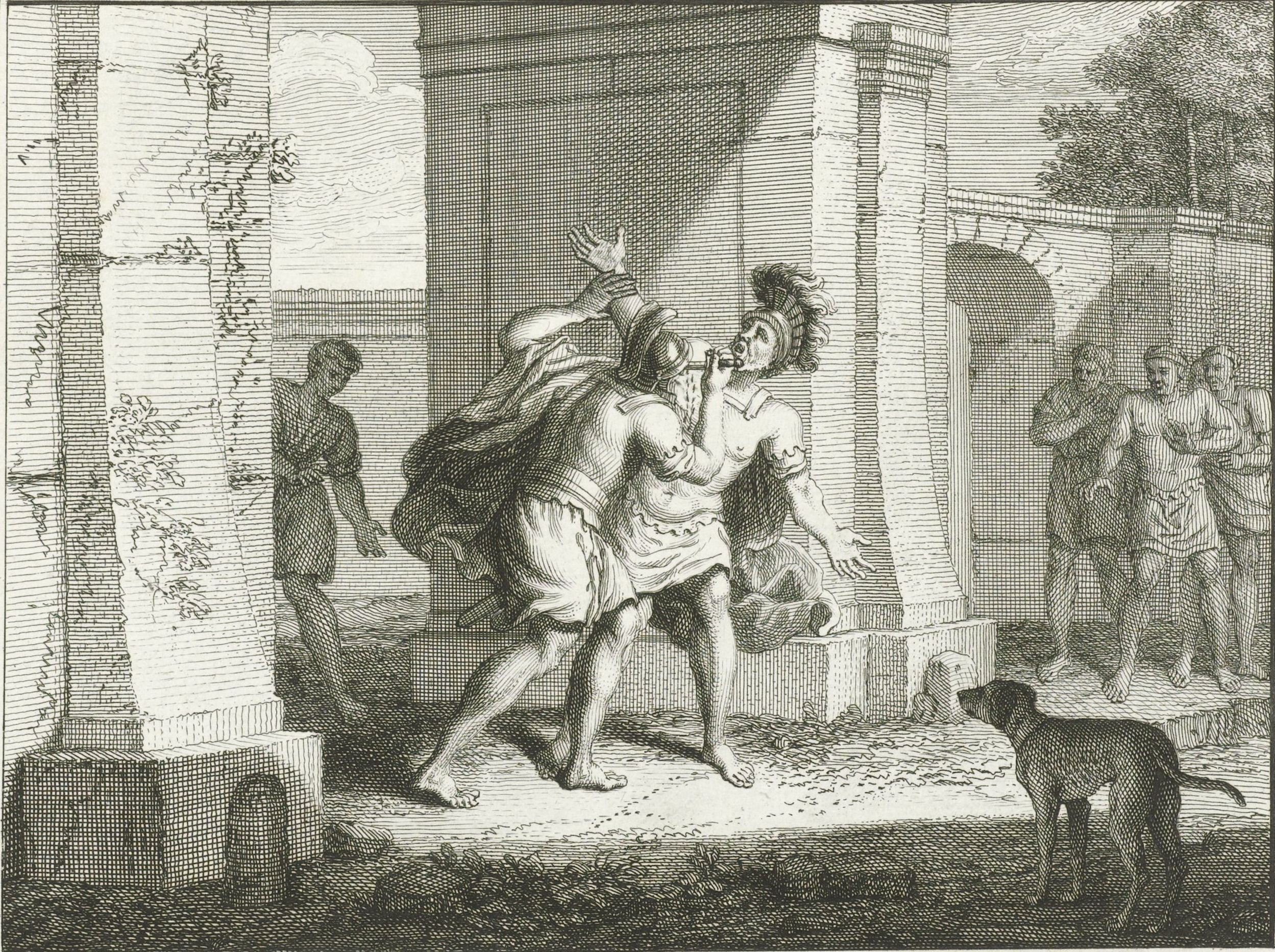
Joab killed Abner near the gate of Hebron, illustration by Jacob Folkema in Ysbrand van Hamelsveld, De gewigtigste geschiedenissen des Bybels (1791).

Joab's private meeting with Abner (verses 22–27) was due to a combination of reasons, from doubting Abner's sincerity (verse 25), removing a competitor to the position of main commander, to the most relevant one, blood-revenge for the death of Asahel (verses 27, 30), with the clear emphasis that David had no part in Abner's death. Abner was reported to have departed in peace from David (verses 21, 22, 24), and David did not know of Joab's plan (verse 26). David's claim of being guiltless was accompanied by his curse upon the guilty Joab (verses 28–29), by David's public display of grief (verses 31–32), and touching tribute to Abner (verses 33–34), also by noting the inability of David to resist the violence of the sons of Zeruiah (verse 39). It has been a consistent theme in the books that David was God's chosen to be king, and he was not involved in any of the violent actions that eventually brought him to the throne.

=== Verse 30 ===
So Joab and Abishai his brother killed Abner, because he had killed their brother Asahel at Gibeon in the battle.

- "Abishai": is not mentioned in the narrative, but might have helped with Joab's plan to kill Abner.

== See also ==
- Abigail
- Abital
- Absalom
- Adonijah
- Ahinoam
- Aiah
- Amnon
- Asahel
- Carmelite
- Chileab
- Eglah
- Haggith
- Israel
- Ithream
- Jezreelite
- Laish
- Maacah
- Nabal
- Ner
- Phaltiel
- Philistines
- Rizpah
- Shephatiah
- Talmai
- Tribe of Benjamin
- Tribe of Ephraim
- Tribe of Judah
- Zeruiah
- Related Bible parts: 1 Samuel 25, 1 Samuel 31, 2 Samuel 1, 2 Samuel 2, 1 Chronicles 2, 1 Chronicles 3

== Sources ==
=== Commentaries on Samuel ===
- Auld, Graeme (2003). "1 & 2 Samuel". In James D. G. Dunn and John William Rogerson (ed.). Eerdmans Commentary on the Bible. Eerdmans. ISBN 9780802837110.
- Bergen, David T. (1996). 1, 2 Samuel. B&H Publishing Group. ISBN 9780805401073.
- Chapman, Stephen B. (2016). 1 Samuel as Christian Scripture: A Theological Commentary. Wm. B. Eerdmans Publishing Company. ISBN 978-1467445160.
- Collins, John J. (2014). "Chapter 14: 1 Samuel 12 – 2 Samuel 25". Introduction to the Hebrew Scriptures. Fortress Press. pp. 277–296. ISBN 978-1451469233.
- Evans, Paul (2018). Longman, Tremper (ed.). 1-2 Samuel. The Story of God Bible Commentary. Zondervan Academic. ISBN 978-0310490944.
- Gordon, Robert (1986). I & II Samuel, A Commentary. Paternoster Press. ISBN 9780310230229.
- Hertzberg, Hans Wilhelm (1964). I & II Samuel, A Commentary (trans. from German 2nd edition 1960 ed.). Westminster John Knox Press. p. 19. ISBN 978-0664223182.
- Morrison, Craig E. (2013). Berit Olam: 2 Samuel. Liturgical Press. ISBN 978-0814682913.

=== General ===
- Breytenbach, Andries (2000). "Who Is Behind The Samuel Narrative?". In Johannes Cornelis de Moor and H.F. Van Rooy (ed.). Past, Present, Future: the Deuteronomistic History and the Prophets. Brill. ISBN 9789004118713.
- Coogan, Michael David (2007). Coogan, Michael David; Brettler, Marc Zvi; Newsom, Carol Ann; Perkins, Pheme (eds.). The New Oxford Annotated Bible with the Apocryphal/Deuterocanonical Books: New Revised Standard Version, Issue 48 (Augmented 3rd ed.). Oxford University Press. ISBN 978-0195288810.
- Fitzmyer, Joseph A. (2008). A Guide to the Dead Sea Scrolls and Related Literature. Grand Rapids, MI: William B. Eerdmans Publishing Company. ISBN 9780802862419.
- Halley, Henry H. (1965). Halley's Bible Handbook: an abbreviated Bible commentary (24th (revised) ed.). Zondervan Publishing House. ISBN 0-310-25720-4.
- Hayes, Christine (2015). Introduction to the Bible. Yale University Press. ISBN 978-0300188271.
- Jones, Gwilym H. (2007). "12. 1 and 2 Samuel". In Barton, John; Muddiman, John (eds.). The Oxford Bible Commentary (first (paperback) ed.). Oxford University Press. pp. 196–232. ISBN 978-0199277186.
- Klein, R.W. (2003). "Samuel, books of". In Bromiley, Geoffrey W (ed.). The International Standard Bible Encyclopedia. Eerdmans. ISBN 9780802837844.
- Knight, Douglas A (1995). "Chapter 4 Deuteronomy and the Deuteronomists". In James Luther Mays, David L. Petersen and Kent Harold Richards (ed.). Old Testament Interpretation. T&T Clark. ISBN 9780567292896.
- McKane, William (1993). "Samuel, Book of". In Metzger, Bruce M; Coogan, Michael D (eds.). The Oxford Companion to the Bible. Oxford University Press. pp. 409–413. ISBN 978-0195046458.
- Ulrich, Eugene, ed. (2010). The Biblical Qumran Scrolls: Transcriptions and Textual Variants. Brill.
- Würthwein, Ernst (1995). The Text of the Old Testament. Translated by Rhodes, Erroll F. Grand Rapids, MI: Wm. B. Eerdmans. ISBN 0-8028-0788-7.
