= 2 Samuel 4 =

Second Book of Samuel chapter

- ← chapter 3 chapter 5 →
- The pages containing the Books of Samuel (1 & 2 Samuel) Leningrad Codex (1008 CE).
- Book: First book of Samuel
- Hebrew Bible part: Nevi'im
- Order in the Hebrew part: 3
- Category: Former Prophets
- Christian Bible part: Old Testament
- Order in the Christian part: 10

2 Samuel 4 is the fourth chapter of the Second Book of Samuel in the Old Testament of the Christian Bible or the second part of Books of Samuel in the Hebrew Bible. Jewish tradition attributes the book to the prophet Samuel, with later additions by the prophets Gad and Nathan; modern scholarship, however, regards it as a compilation of independent texts dated to c. 630–540 BCE. This chapter contains the account of David's reign in Hebron. This chapter lies within a narrative consisting of 1 Samuel 16 to 2 Samuel 5 that records the rise of David as the king of Israel, as well as within a section consisting of 2 Samuel 2–8 that deals with the period when David set up his kingdom.

== Text ==
This chapter was originally written in Biblical Hebrew. It is divided into 12 verses.

=== Textual witnesses ===
Some early manuscripts containing the text of this chapter in Biblical Hebrew are of the Masoretic Textual tradition, which includes the Codex Cairensis (895), Aleppo Codex (10th century), and Codex Leningradensis (1008). Fragments containing parts of this chapter in Hebrew were found among the Dead Sea Scrolls including 4Q51 (4QSam^{a}; 100–50 BCE) with extant verses 1–4, 9–12.

Extant ancient manuscripts of a translation into Koine Greek known as the Septuagint (composed in the last few centuries BCE) include Codex Vaticanus (B; $\mathfrak{G}$^{B}; 4th century) and Codex Alexandrinus (A; $\mathfrak{G}$^{A}; 5th century). (Note: The whole book of 2 Samuel is missing from the extant Codex Sinaiticus.)

== Places ==
Places mentioned in this chapter
- Beeroth
- Gibeon
- Hebron
- Jezreel
- Ziklag

== Analysis ==
The narrative of David's reign in Hebron in 2 Samuel 1:1–5:5 has the following structure:

A. Looking back to the final scenes of 1 Samuel (1:1)

B. David receives Saul's crown (1:2–12)

C. David executes Saul's killer (1:13–16)

D. David's lament for Saul and Jonathan (1:17-27)

E. Two kings in the land (2:1–3:6)
E'. One king in the land: Abner switches sides (3:7–27)

D'. David's lament for Abner (3:28–39)

C'. David executes Ishbaal's killers (4:1–12)

B'. David wears Saul's crown (5:1–3)

A'. Looking forward to David's reign in Jerusalem (5:4–5)

David's narrative of his ascension to the throne in Hebron is framed by an opening verse that looks backward to the final chapters of 1 Samuel (Saul's death and David's refuge in Ziklag) and closing verses that look forward to David's rule in Jerusalem (2 Samuel 5). The action begins when David received Saul's crown and concludes when he was finally able to wear that crown. David executes the Amalekite who claims to have assisted Saul with his suicide and those who murdered Ishbaal. Two laments were recorded: one for Saul and Jonathan and another shorter one for Abner. At the center are the two key episodes: the existence of two kings in the land (David and Ishbaal), because Joab's forces could not conquer Saul's territory on the battlefield. However, this was resolved when Ishbaal foolishly challenged Abner's loyalty, causing Abner to switch sides that eventually brought Saul's kingdom under Davidic rule.

== Death of Ish-bosheth (4:1–7) ==
Abner was very powerful that he virtually ruled Israel (cf. 2:8-9; 3:6), so his death caused confusion and uncertainty to the whole kingdom including its king, leading a plot to assassinate Ish-bosheth by two army officers of Israel, Baanah and Rechab, whose lineage is detailed in verses 2–3 and came from Beeroth, which 'was considered to belong to Benjamin' (verse 2, cf. Joshua 18:25). The two assassins got into Ishbaal's house at noon, when he was taking a siesta, on the pretext of "taking wheat" to be allowed to enter, quickly committed their gruesome task and ran away with Ish-bosheth's severed head (verse 7).

A short information was given in verse 4 about Jonathan's son, Mephibosheth (or Meribaal, cf. 1 Chronicles 8:34; 9:40), which links to 2 Samuel 9:1–13, apparently to show that, beside Ish-bosheth, there was no more serious contender for the throne from the house of Saul; Mephibosheth himself was only a minor ('five years old') at that time and a cripple.

=== Verse 2 ===
And Saul's son had two men that were captains of bands: the name of the one was Baanah, and the name of the other Rechab, the sons of Rimmon a Beerothite, of the children of Benjamin: (for Beeroth also was reckoned to Benjamin:

- "Beeroth": one of the four cities of the Gibeonites (Joshua 9:17), and was allotted to the tribe of Benjamin (Joshua 18:25). It is identified with the modern El-Bireh, nine miles north of Jerusalem. It is mentioned that Beeroth “was reckoned to Benjamin,” in the past tense, because in the time the Books of Samuel was written it was no longer inhabited.

=== Verse 4 ===
Jonathan, Saul’s son, had a son who was lame in his feet. He was five years old when the news about Saul and Jonathan came from Jezreel; and his nurse took him up and fled. And it happened, as she made haste to flee, that he fell and became lame. His name was Mephibosheth.

- "Mephibosheth": written as "Merib-Baal" in 1 Chronicles 8:34; 9:40.

== Execution of Rechab and Baanah (4:8–12) ==
The two assassins brought Ish-bosheth's head straight to David, claiming to have avenged David on Saul, who was described as an 'enemy' for Saul had sought David's life (verse 8). David immediately distanced himself from their action, as he had consistently showed a great respect for a reigning monarch and did not wish to seize the throne, because being YHWH's elect, he was to advance naturally to be a king without having to stoop to violence. His attitude was made explicit in verses 9–11, recalling how he commanded to kill the Amalekite who claimed to have killed Saul, so he had to punish these assassins to death for they had 'killed a righteous man on his bed in his own house' (verse 11–12). Thus, the narratives demonstrate that David was totally innocent of the assassinations that brought him to the throne.

=== Verse 12 ===
And David commanded his young men, and they slew them, and cut off their hands and their feet, and hanged them up over the pool in Hebron. But they took the head of Ishbosheth, and buried it in the sepulchre of Abner in Hebron.

- "Ish-bosheth: 4QSam^{a} reads “Mephibosheth”.
- "Abner": the name is followed by the phrase "the son of Ner" in Greek Septuagint versions.
- “In Hebron": not included in some Greek Septuagint manuscripts

== See also ==
- Israel
- Jonathan
- Rimmon
- Tribe of Benjamin
- Related Bible parts: 1 Samuel 26, 2 Samuel 1, 1 Chronicles 8, 1 Chronicles 9

== Sources ==
=== Commentaries on Samuel ===
- Auld, Graeme (2003). "1 & 2 Samuel". In James D. G. Dunn and John William Rogerson (ed.). Eerdmans Commentary on the Bible. Eerdmans. ISBN 9780802837110.
- Bergen, David T. (1996). 1, 2 Samuel. B&H Publishing Group. ISBN 9780805401073.
- Chapman, Stephen B. (2016). 1 Samuel as Christian Scripture: A Theological Commentary. Wm. B. Eerdmans Publishing Company. ISBN 978-1467445160.
- Collins, John J. (2014). "Chapter 14: 1 Samuel 12 – 2 Samuel 25". Introduction to the Hebrew Scriptures. Fortress Press. pp. 277–296. ISBN 978-1451469233.
- Evans, Paul (2018). Longman, Tremper (ed.). 1-2 Samuel. The Story of God Bible Commentary. Zondervan Academic. ISBN 978-0310490944.
- Gordon, Robert (1986). I & II Samuel, A Commentary. Paternoster Press. ISBN 9780310230229.
- Hertzberg, Hans Wilhelm (1964). I & II Samuel, A Commentary (trans. from German 2nd edition 1960 ed.). Westminster John Knox Press. p. 19. ISBN 978-0664223182.
- Morrison, Craig E. (2013). Berit Olam: 2 Samuel. Liturgical Press. ISBN 978-0814682913.

=== General ===
- Breytenbach, Andries (2000). "Who Is Behind The Samuel Narrative?". In Johannes Cornelis de Moor and H.F. Van Rooy (ed.). Past, Present, Future: the Deuteronomistic History and the Prophets. Brill. ISBN 9789004118713.
- Coogan, Michael David (2007). Coogan, Michael David; Brettler, Marc Zvi; Newsom, Carol Ann; Perkins, Pheme (eds.). The New Oxford Annotated Bible with the Apocryphal/Deuterocanonical Books: New Revised Standard Version, Issue 48 (Augmented 3rd ed.). Oxford University Press. ISBN 978-0195288810.
- Fitzmyer, Joseph A. (2008). A Guide to the Dead Sea Scrolls and Related Literature. Grand Rapids, MI: William B. Eerdmans Publishing Company. ISBN 9780802862419.
- Halley, Henry H. (1965). Halley's Bible Handbook: an abbreviated Bible commentary (24th (revised) ed.). Zondervan Publishing House. ISBN 0-310-25720-4.
- Hayes, Christine (2015). Introduction to the Bible. Yale University Press. ISBN 978-0300188271.
- Jones, Gwilym H. (2007). "12. 1 and 2 Samuel". In Barton, John; Muddiman, John (eds.). The Oxford Bible Commentary (first (paperback) ed.). Oxford University Press. pp. 196–232. ISBN 978-0199277186.
- Klein, R.W. (2003). "Samuel, books of". In Bromiley, Geoffrey W (ed.). The International Standard Bible Encyclopedia. Eerdmans. ISBN 9780802837844.
- Knight, Douglas A (1995). "Chapter 4 Deuteronomy and the Deuteronomists". In James Luther Mays, David L. Petersen and Kent Harold Richards (ed.). Old Testament Interpretation. T&T Clark. ISBN 9780567292896.
- McKane, William (1993). "Samuel, Book of". In Metzger, Bruce M; Coogan, Michael D (eds.). The Oxford Companion to the Bible. Oxford University Press. pp. 409–413. ISBN 978-0195046458.
- Ulrich, Eugene, ed. (2010). The Biblical Qumran Scrolls: Transcriptions and Textual Variants. Brill.
- Würthwein, Ernst (1995). The Text of the Old Testament. Translated by Rhodes, Erroll F. Grand Rapids, MI: Wm. B. Eerdmans. ISBN 0-8028-0788-7.
