= Joab in rabbinic literature =

Allusions in rabbinic literature to the Biblical character Joab, the nephew of King David and commander of his army, contain various expansions, elaborations and inferences beyond what is presented in the text of the Bible itself.

== Introduction ==
Joab appears in the Mishnah as the ideal general. He and David supplemented each other; he would not have succeeded in his wars without David's continuous study of the Torah, and David would not have been able to apply himself to his ideal pursuits without such a reliable general as Joab.

His generosity is indicated by the words "his house in the wilderness" (I Kings 2:34), which are meant that his house was as free as the wilderness, that it was open to everybody to find there food of all kinds, like a wilderness, it was free from robbery. Rabbi Johanan even declared that Joab was not guilty of Abner's death, but that he brought him before the Sanhedrin, which, in the gate of the city (compare Deuteronomy 16:18), condemned Abner for killing Asahel. When Joab had smitten the male children of Edom, David inquired why he had done so; Joab answered, "It is written, 'Thou shalt blot out the males (zachar) of Amalek'" (Deuteronomy 25:19). David retorted, "But it is zecher ("remembrance"), not zachar!" Joab replied that his teacher had made him read zachar.

Joab struggled hard but vainly to dissuade David from numbering the people. Joab made two numberings, a complete and an incomplete one. He intended to render the incomplete numbering; if David became angry, he would give him the complete one. After Joab had fled to the Tabernacle, he was brought before the judges for trial. Declared not guilty of the murder of Abner, as he had only avenged the blood of his brother Asahel, he was condemned for the murder of Amasa; to Joab's defense that Amasa was a traitor because he had failed to execute David's order (compare II Samuel 20:4-5), the judges objected that Amasa, being occupied with the study of the Law, was not bound to execute the king's order. When Benaiah went to execute Joab the latter said: "Let not Solomon condemn me to a double punishment; let him either kill me and take on himself the curses which his father uttered against me [II Samuel 3:29] or let me live and suffer from the curses only."

Solomon took on himself the curses, all of which were fulfilled in his descendants. The Talmudists disagree as to whether Joab left a son or not, as some identify the Joab of Ezra 8:9 with the general of David.

== Midrashim ==
In various midrashim Joab is the subject of a number of hero-tales. Once, hearing David repeat, "Like as a father pitieth his children" (Psalms 103:13), Joab objected that a mother had more pity for her children than a father. David suggested that he should more carefully observe the dispositions of parents toward their children, and to do this, Joab undertook a journey. He arrived at the house of a poor old laborer who had twelve sons and who worked very hard to support his family. In the evening the old man divided the bread which he had won by his day's labor into fourteen equal pieces, for his twelve sons, his wife, and himself. On the following day Joab said to the old man: "You are old and feeble; why do you work for your young sons? Take my advice and sell one of them; and with the money you will be able to live with your family in comfort." The old man rebuked him for such advice and went on to his work; from the mother, however, he succeeded, after meeting many objections, in buying one son for one hundred pieces of gold. In the evening Joab, himself unseen, observed what passed between the father and the mother. The former, having noticed that one of the fourteen pieces of bread remained untouched, asked after his son. His wife at first gave various reasons for his absence, but her husband remained unsatisfied, and she was obliged to tell him the truth. The man took the money, and, having found Joab, demanded the return of his son. As Joab resisted, the man threatened to kill him unless he restored his son to him, which Joab gladly did, and acknowledged that David was right.

== Siege of Kinsali ==
At the head of 12,000 warriors Joab besieged Kinsali, or Ḳinsari, the capital of the Amalekites. After a fruitless siege of six months Joab's men despaired and desired to return to their homes. But Joab, having supplied himself with money, and taking his sword, ordered them to hurl him over the wall from a sling and wait forty days; if at the end of that time they saw blood flowing under the gates they would know that he was alive. His order was executed, and he fell in the yard of a house where lived a widow and her married daughter. Joab was taken and revived by its inmates, meeting their questions by telling them "I am an Amalekite; the Israelites captured me and threw me over the wall; now let me stay with you and I will pay you." At the end of ten days Joab went into one of the 140 streets of the city, entered a smith's shop, and ordered the smith to make a sword like the one which he had, but which was broken. The first two which the smith made Joab shook and broke, but the third one stood the test. Joab asked the blacksmith who should be killed with such a sword, and the answer was "Joab." With the words "Suppose I am Joab" he slew the smith. Then Joab went into the principal street, killed 500 mercenaries whom he met, and returned to the house. In the city it was rumored that Asmodai had killed the mercenaries; when Joab was asked whether he had heard of it he said he had not. Joab paid his hostess for ten more days, and at the end of that time went to the gate of the city, where he slew 1,500 men. This time his hand stuck to the sword, and he returned to the house and asked the young woman for warm water. But she said to him, "You eat and drink in our house and go out to kill our people!" Joab thereupon ran her through with his sword, after which his hand was healed. He then went into the street, killed every one he met on his way to the gates, slew the guard and threw open the gates. The Israelites had seen the blood flowing under the gates and shouted for joy. After ordering them to send for David, Joab climbed onto a tower in order that all might see him, and then saw the twentieth Psalm written on his right foot. Joab slew all the people of the city except the king, whom he left for David himself to kill. Then Joab put the slain king's crown on David's head while his troops were engaged in carrying off the spoils of the city.
