= House of Saul =

Reigning dynasty of the United Kingdom of Israel

The House of Saul was a reigning dynasty of the united Kingdom of Israel. It is named after its founder, Saul. Its brief period of rule encompassed the reigns of Saul and his son Ish-bosheth (Eshbaal). Its history is primarily recorded in the Bible's Books of Samuel, which portray a prolonged political and dynastic struggle between the House of Saul, associated with the Tribe of Benjamin, and the rival House of David of the Tribe of Judah. The biblical narrative presents David's rise to power as divinely sanctioned and legitimized through Saul's failures, culminating in the civil war following Saul's death and the eventual transfer of kingship from Saul's descendants to David.

== Biblical narrative ==
The primary source about this dynasty is the Books of Samuel, with additional document witnesses in the Books of Chronicles. A Saul–David narrative covers most of the first book of Samuel and the first part of the second book of Samuel. The narrative begins with the story of the lost asses and an encounter between Saul and Samuel (1 Samuel 9:1–10:16) and ends with a list of subdued peoples and kings (2 Samuel 8:1–15). There is reason to believe that several sections of this narrative were later additions. The main purpose of this narrative is a defense of David's legitimacy as a king, through a translatio imperii (Latin for "transfer of rule") from Saul to David.

The narrative makes three arguments concerning David's legitimacy as a king. The first is that this transfer of power was decided by God. The second is that the transfer was caused by Saul's failure as a king. The third is that David himself did not force his rise to the throne. The narrative further presents Saul as a representative of the Tribe of Benjamin and David as a representative of the Tribe of Judah, and covers the story of the dynasties which the two founded: the House of Saul and the House of David.

A rivalry between the two dynasties is hinted through certain passages of the narrative. In 1 Samuel 20:16, there is mention of a covenant between Jonathan and the House of David. In 1 Samuel 24:20–21, Saul himself predicts the rise of David to the throne, and the establishment of the Kingdom of Israel through David's hand. Saul asks David to swear an oath that he will not eliminate Saul's descendants or wipe out Saul's name "from the house of my father". In 1 Samuel 25:28, Abigail appears certain that David will establish a "steadfast house", with the rationale that David is fighting the battles of Yahweh. In 2 Samuel 3:1, the two dynasties are reported to be rivals in a long war, with the House of David growing stronger and the House of Saul growing weaker.

This is not the only Biblical narrative of an Israelite or Judahite leader gaining an important victory. In the Book of Judges, Barak defeats Sisera, Ehud defeats Eglon, and Gideon defeats Oreb and Zeeb. In the Books of Kings, Asa of Judah defeats Baasha of Israel. But these victory narratives are much shorter than the Saul-David narrative. The reason for the emphasis on this narrative was its impact on the intended audience. The narrative was more important than a mere victory in battle or the establishment of a state, because it depicted the foundation of the kingdom where the audience lived.

The narrative defends the legitimacy of David and his dynasty, and accomplishes this through the delegitimization of the House of Saul. The stakes of this narrative was proving whether the legitimate king of Israel originates in the House of David or the House of Saul. The rivalry between the two dynasties is also depicted as a rivalry between the Tribe of Judah and the Tribe of Benjamin. In 1 Samuel 22:7, Saul appeals to the loyalty of his Benjaminite kinsmen. Elsewhere, David relies on the loyalty of the tribe of Judah.

Another biblical narrative is the so-called "Court History" or Succession Narrative, covering 2 Samuel 9–20, and 1 Kings 1–2. There, Shimei ben Gera accuses David of having murdered the House of Saul. In 2 Samuel 16:5, Shimei is depicted as a Benjaminite from the same clan as Saul, while in 2 Samuel 19:21, Shimei is depicted as first among the Tribe of Joseph. In 2 Samuel 20:1, Sheba son of Bichri of the Tribe of Benjamin proclaims a rebellion against the House of David. In both cases, the two Benjaminites are instigators of conflict against David, and in both cases the Tribe of Benjamin appears opposed to the House of David and to the Tribe of Judah.

While the two dynasties compete over kingship of Israel, the kingship of Judah is depicted as separate and belonging to the House of David alone. In 2 Samuel 5:5, the narrative reports that David ruled over Judah at the capital city of Hebron for 7 years and 6 months, before reigning over Israel. In 2 Samuel 3:10, Abner states his intentions to set up the throne of David over both kingdoms, Israel and Judah.

The Saul-David narrative depicts the House of David gaining the throne without resorting to illegal actions, such as usurpation or acts of violence. Instead it depicts Saul acting "reprehensibly". The aim seems to be to convince an audience of both Judahites and Benjaminites. This suggests that the text was composed in an era where relations between the two tribes were uncertain.

== Reign ==
Following the death of Saul, there was a bloody civil war between a Kingdom of Israel and the Kingdom of Judah, represented respectively by the House of Saul and David. It lasted for two years. At the end of it, Saul's son and successor Eshbaal (Ish-bosheth) was assassinated. The kingdom of northern Israel then sent representatives to David at the city of Hebron, where they anointed him king. The reign and death of Ishbaal are recorded in 2 Samuel, but omitted entirely in the Books of Chronicles.

David was a son-in-law of Saul, having married Saul's daughter Michal. In case all of Saul's children perished, David had a chance to claim Saul's inheritance through his marriage to Michal. This can be seen to improve his claim to power through an advantageous marriage. The Chronicler does not mention David's marriage to Michal. There is no record of children from this marriage. In fact, in the Second Book of Samuel, she is said to have never borne children (2 Samuel 6:23).

The genealogy of Saul in the Books of Chronicles (1 Chronicles 9–10) mentions his sons Jonathan, Malchi-shua, Abinadab, and Eshbaal. The genealogy continues with Jonathan's son Meribaal (Mephibosheth). David is not mentioned as part of this genealogy. The genealogy then mentions Meribaal's son Micah and Micah's descendants.

== See also ==
- David and Jonathan

== Sources ==
- Knoppers, Gary N. (2006), "Israel's First King and "the Kingdom of YHWH in the hands of the sons of David":The Place of the Saulide Monarchy in the Chronicler's Historiography", in Ehrlich, Carl S.; White, Marsha C. (eds.), Saul in Story and Tradition, Mohr Siebeck, ISBN 978-3161485695
- Oswald, Wolfgang (2020), "Possible Historical Settings of the Saul-David Narrative", in Krause, Joachim J.; Sergi, Omer; Weingart, Kristin (eds.), Saul, Benjamin, and the Emergence of Monarchy in Israel: Biblical and Archaeological Perspectives, SBL Press, ISBN 978-0884144519
