= Ammah =

Ammah - a cubit, the name of a hill which Joab and Abishai reached as the sun set, when they were in pursuit of Abner (2 Samuel 2:24). It lay to the east of Gibeon.
