= Elifelet (disambiguation) =

Elifelet (Hebrew: אֱלִיפֶלֶט) is a moshav in northern Israel.

Elifelet may also refer to:

- Eliphalet, given name of Biblical origin
- Elifelet (organization), an NGO working for children of migrant workers in Tel Aviv
- Elifelet Station, station on the Red Line (Tel Aviv Light Rail)
- "Elifelet", poem by Nathan Alterman, put to song
