= 2 Samuel 5 =

Second Book of Samuel chapter

- ← chapter 4 chapter 6 →
- The pages containing the Books of Samuel (1 & 2 Samuel) Leningrad Codex (1008 CE).
- Book: First book of Samuel
- Hebrew Bible part: Nevi'im
- Order in the Hebrew part: 3
- Category: Former Prophets
- Christian Bible part: Old Testament
- Order in the Christian part: 10

2 Samuel 5 is the fifth chapter of the Second Book of Samuel in the Old Testament of the Christian Bible or the second part of Books of Samuel in the Hebrew Bible. Jewish tradition attributes the book to the prophet Samuel, with later additions by the prophets Gad and Nathan; modern scholarship, however, regards it as a compilation of independent texts dated to c. 630–540 BCE. This chapter contains the account of David's reign in Hebron and Jerusalem. This is within a section comprising 1 Samuel 16 to 2 Samuel 5 recording the rise of David as the king of Israel, ad well as a section comprising 2 Samuel 2–8 that deals with the period when David set up his kingdom.

== Text ==
This chapter was originally written in the Hebrew language. It is divided into 25 verses.

=== Textual witnesses ===
Some early manuscripts containing the text of this chapter in Hebrew are of the Masoretic Text tradition, which includes the Codex Cairensis (895), Aleppo Codex (10th century), and Codex Leningradensis (1008). Fragments containing parts of this chapter in Hebrew were found among the Dead Sea Scrolls including 4Q51 (4QSam^{a}; 100–50 BCE) with extant verses 1–3, 6–16, 18–19.

Extant ancient manuscripts of a translation into Koine Greek known as the Septuagint (originally was made in the last few centuries BCE) include Codex Vaticanus (B; $\mathfrak{G}$^{B}; 4th century) and Codex Alexandrinus (A; $\mathfrak{G}$^{A}; 5th century). (Note: The whole book of 2 Samuel is missing from the extant Codex Sinaiticus.)

=== Old Testament references ===
- 2 Samuel 5:1–11: 1 Chronicles 11:1–9
- 2 Samuel 5:12–25: 1 Chronicles 14:1–9

== Places ==
Places mentioned in this chapter
- Baal-perazim
- Geba
- Gezer
- Jerusalem
- Millo
- Tyre
- Valley of Rephaim

== Analysis ==
The narrative of David's reign in Hebron in 2 Samuel 1:1–5:5 has the following structure:

A. Looking back to the final scenes of 1 Samuel (1:1)

B. David receives Saul's crown (1:2-12)

C. David executes Saul's killer (1:13-16)

D. David's lament for Saul and Jonathan (1:17-27)

E. Two kings in the land (2:1-3:6)
E'. One king in the land: Abner switches sides (3:7-27)

D'. David's lament for Abner (3:28-39)

C'. David executes Ishbaal's killers (4:1-12)

B'. David wears Saul's crown (5:1-3)

A'. Looking forward to David's reign in Jerusalem (5:4-5)

David's narrative of his ascension to the throne in Hebron is framed by an opening verse that looks backward to the final chapters of 1 Samuel (Saul's death and David's refuge in Ziklag) and closing verses that look forward to David's rule in Jerusalem (2 Samuel 5). The action begins when David received Saul's crown and concludes when he was finally able to wear that crown. David executes the Amalekite who claims to have assisted Saul with his suicide and those who murdered Ishbaal. Two laments were recorded: one for Saul and Jonathan and another shorter one for Abner. At the center are the two key episodes: the existence of two kings in the land (David and Ishbaal), because Joab's forces could not conquer Saul's territory on the battlefield. However, this was resolved when Ishbaal foolishly challenged Abner's loyalty, causing Abner to switch sides that eventually brought Saul's kingdom under Davidic rule.

== David anointed king of all Israel (5:1–5) ==
With Ishbaal's death, David had no more rival for the throne of Israel (verses 1–2). The "tribes of Israel", noting his ties with the house of Saul, his proven leadership against the Philistines as well as God's promises to make him king, sent the 'elders of Israel' (cf. 'elders of Judah' in 2 Samuel 2:4) to Hebron to make 'a covenant... before the LORD', then anoint David as 'king'.

=== Verse 3 ===
Therefore all the elders of Israel came to the king at Hebron, and King David made a covenant with them at Hebron before the LORD. And they anointed David king over Israel.

- "They anointed David king over Israel": this was the third anointing of David, as the first was by Samuel, the second was by the tribe of Judah, and now by all the tribes of Israel, with great numbers of the people eating, drinking and rejoicing with David (1 Chronicles 12:1).

== David conquered Jerusalem (5:6–10) ==
The next important step was the capture of Jerusalem (verses 6–9), which until then was occupied by the 'Jebusites', who were of Canaanite origin (Genesis 10:16). The name of Jerusalem is found in Egyptian Execration texts of the 19th and 18th centuries BCE and in the Amarna texts of the 14th century BCE. The Israelites did not capture the city when they conquered Canaan (Joshua 15:63; Judges 1:21), so it became a foreign independent enclave until David captured it. The fortress (or stronghold) is strategically located away from the main north–south routes and situated more or less on the border between Judah and the rest of Israel, so it was a wise choice as capital. The Jebusites were so confident that their city could never be taken, so they said to David that even handicapped persons, 'the blind and the lame', would be able to defend it (verse 6). When David conquered the city he used the phrase back to call the defeated defenders 'the lame and the blind' (verse 8). The attackers went 'up the water shaft' to enter the city (verse 8), that is, the vertical shaft from the city to the Spring of Gihon, then David occupied the fortress on the hill in the south-eastern corner of Jerusalem, also called "Ophel", and renamed it 'the city of David'. The account of David capturing of the city has a fitting conclusion in verse 10, which could be intended as the closing statement of the history of David's rise to the throne of Israel.

=== Verse 9 ===
So David dwelt in the fort, and called it the city of David. And David built round about from Millo and inward.

- "Millo": was an earth-fill to form a rampart or a platform, terracing on the eastern slope. In Hebrew this word always used with the definite article (except in Judges 9:6; Judges 9:20). The name is probably from an old Canaanite word for 'the fortification on the northern end of Mount Zion'. Solomon (1 Kings 11:27) and Hezekiah (2 Chronicles 32:5) strengthened it.

=== Verse 10 ===
And David went on, and grew great, and the Lord God of hosts was with him..

- "The Lord God of hosts": the word "God" is not found in 4QSam^{a} or the Greek Septuagint, probably to have harmonization with the more common biblical phrase “the Lord of hosts".

== David's growing fame and family (5:11–16) ==
This section contains two brief notes:

1. Verses 11–12 reports the negotiations with king Hiram of Tyre, who had building materials and craftsmen for David's building projects. It can also refer to a later period in David's reign as Hiram also helped with Solomon's building projects.
2. Verses 13–16 lists the sons born to David in Jerusalem as a continuation of the list in 2 Samuel 3:2–5. The same list, with some variations, is given in 1 Chronicles 3:5–8 and 1 Chronicles 14:5–7.

=== Verse 14 ===
And these be the names of those that were born unto him in Jerusalem; Shammua, and Shobab, and Nathan, and Solomon,

- "Nathan and Solomon": According to The four sons listed here, according to he parallel reading in 1 Chronicles 3:5 were born of Bathsheba (Bath-shua), so in a later period of David's reign. Solomon and Nathan are the two sons of David through whom the Gospels of Matthew and Luke respectively trace the genealogy of Jesus Christ.

== Two victories over the Philistines (5:17–25) ==
The narrative of David's two victories over the Philistines could be connected with an earlier point when he was 'anointed king over Israel' (verse 17), where his 'stronghold' was not yet Jerusalem, but could be Adullam. On both occasions David consulted God, receiving a distinct reply for each — straight positive on the first event, but a negative on the second occasion, followed by further advice — leading to victories in all cases. The Philistines came up to Rephaim, a plain located south-west of Jerusalem, and in the first battle David defeated them at Baal-perazim ('Lord of Bursting Forth'). In the second battle David was advised to take a different route and attack from the flank in the vicinity of 'balsam trees', bushy plants characteristic of a hilly region. The second victory was decisive as the Philistines were pushed 'from Geba' (Septuagint reads 'from Gibeon', six miles north-west of Jerusalem) back to their border at Gezer.

== See also ==
- Carpentry
- Concubinage
- Eliada
- Eliphalet
- Elishama
- Elishua
- Hiram
- Ibhar
- Japhia
- Jebusites
- Masonry
- Nepheg
- Philistines
- Saul
- Shammuah
- Shobab
- Solomon
- Tribes of Israel
- United Monarchy of Israel
- Related Bible parts: Joshua 15, Judges 9, 1 Chronicles 3, 1 Chronicles 12, 1 Chronicles 14, 2 Chronicles 32, Matthew 1, Luke 3

== Sources ==
=== Commentaries on Samuel ===
- Auld, Graeme (2003). "1 & 2 Samuel". In James D. G. Dunn and John William Rogerson (ed.). Eerdmans Commentary on the Bible. Eerdmans. ISBN 9780802837110.
- Bergen, David T. (1996). 1, 2 Samuel. B&H Publishing Group. ISBN 9780805401073.
- Chapman, Stephen B. (2016). 1 Samuel as Christian Scripture: A Theological Commentary. Wm. B. Eerdmans Publishing Company. ISBN 978-1467445160.
- Collins, John J. (2014). "Chapter 14: 1 Samuel 12 – 2 Samuel 25". Introduction to the Hebrew Scriptures. Fortress Press. pp. 277–296. ISBN 978-1451469233.
- Evans, Paul (2018). Longman, Tremper (ed.). 1-2 Samuel. The Story of God Bible Commentary. Zondervan Academic. ISBN 978-0310490944.
- Gordon, Robert (1986). I & II Samuel, A Commentary. Paternoster Press. ISBN 9780310230229.
- Hertzberg, Hans Wilhelm (1964). I & II Samuel, A Commentary (trans. from German 2nd edition 1960 ed.). Westminster John Knox Press. p. 19. ISBN 978-0664223182.
- Morrison, Craig E. (2013). Berit Olam: 2 Samuel. Liturgical Press. ISBN 978-0814682913.

=== General ===
- Breytenbach, Andries (2000). "Who Is Behind The Samuel Narrative?". In Johannes Cornelis de Moor and H.F. Van Rooy (ed.). Past, Present, Future: the Deuteronomistic History and the Prophets. Brill. ISBN 9789004118713.
- Coogan, Michael David (2007). Coogan, Michael David; Brettler, Marc Zvi; Newsom, Carol Ann; Perkins, Pheme (eds.). The New Oxford Annotated Bible with the Apocryphal/Deuterocanonical Books: New Revised Standard Version, Issue 48 (Augmented 3rd ed.). Oxford University Press. ISBN 978-0195288810.
- Fitzmyer, Joseph A. (2008). A Guide to the Dead Sea Scrolls and Related Literature. Grand Rapids, MI: William B. Eerdmans Publishing Company. ISBN 9780802862419.
- Halley, Henry H. (1965). Halley's Bible Handbook: an abbreviated Bible commentary (24th (revised) ed.). Zondervan Publishing House. ISBN 0-310-25720-4.
- Hayes, Christine (2015). Introduction to the Bible. Yale University Press. ISBN 978-0300188271.
- Jones, Gwilym H. (2007). "12. 1 and 2 Samuel". In Barton, John; Muddiman, John (eds.). The Oxford Bible Commentary (first (paperback) ed.). Oxford University Press. pp. 196–232. ISBN 978-0199277186.
- Klein, R.W. (2003). "Samuel, books of". In Bromiley, Geoffrey W (ed.). The International Standard Bible Encyclopedia. Eerdmans. ISBN 9780802837844.
- Knight, Douglas A (1995). "Chapter 4 Deuteronomy and the Deuteronomists". In James Luther Mays, David L. Petersen and Kent Harold Richards (ed.). Old Testament Interpretation. T&T Clark. ISBN 9780567292896.
- McKane, William (1993). "Samuel, Book of". In Metzger, Bruce M; Coogan, Michael D (eds.). The Oxford Companion to the Bible. Oxford University Press. pp. 409–413. ISBN 978-0195046458.
- Ulrich, Eugene, ed. (2010). The Biblical Qumran Scrolls: Transcriptions and Textual Variants. Brill.
- Würthwein, Ernst (1995). The Text of the Old Testament. Translated by Rhodes, Erroll F. Grand Rapids, MI: Wm. B. Eerdmans. ISBN 0-8028-0788-7.
