= Asahel =

Military leader

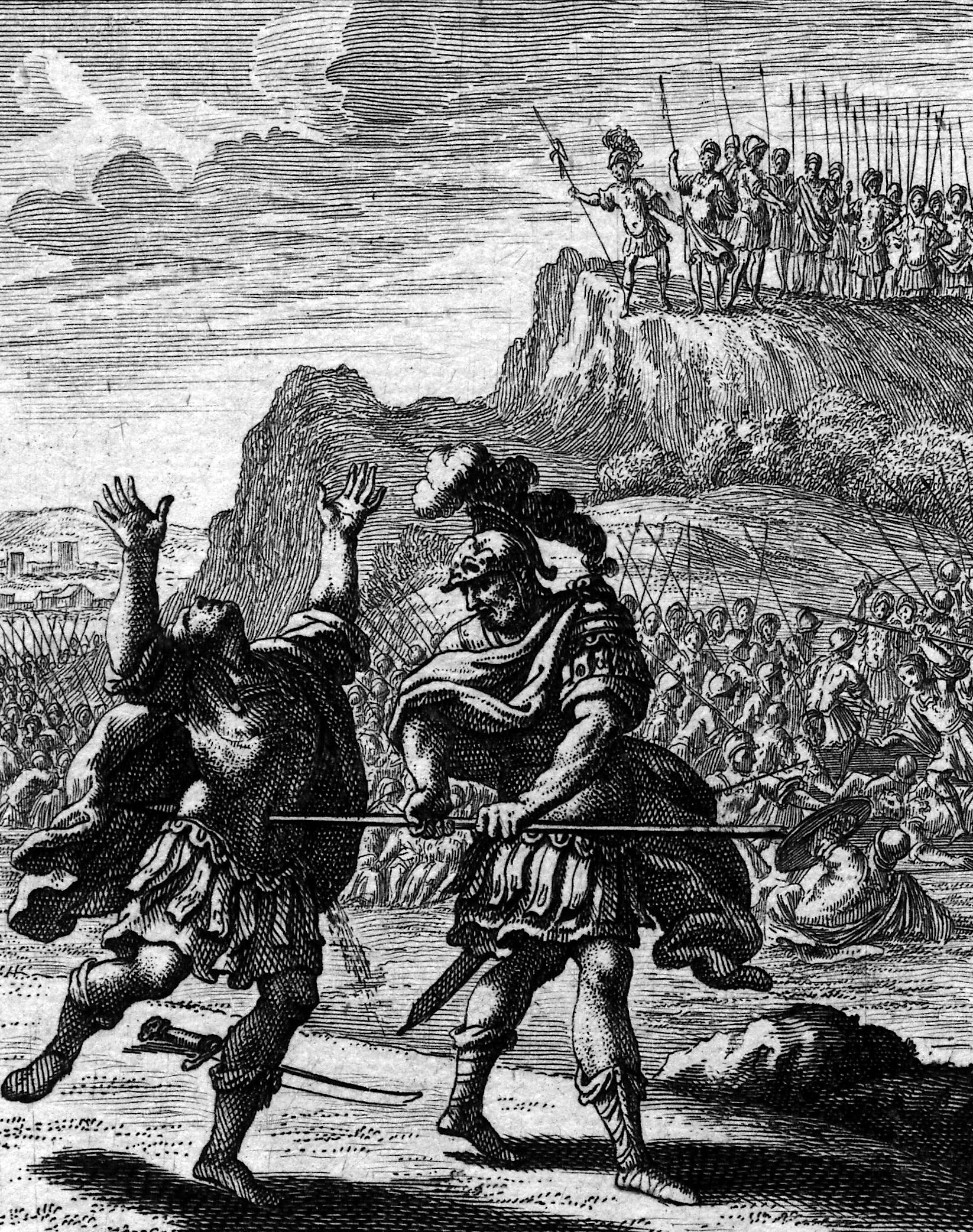
Woodcut of Abner killing Asahel, by Johann Christoph Weigel, 1695

Asahel (Hebrew: עֲשָׂהאֵל ʿĂśāʾēl, Ancient Greek: ‘Ασαέλ, Latin Asael) was a military leader under King David and the youngest son of David's sister Zeruiah. Asahel thus was the nephew of David and the younger brother of David's general, Joab. Asahel is mentioned in 2 Samuel chapters 2 and 3.

== Name ==
The name means 'made by God. It is made up of two parts: the verb עשה, Hebrew "to do, make" 3rd m.sg. perfect, and the theophorous element (deity name), אל, the Hebrew God El, or Elohim. This would make it a name of "thanksgiving", thanking God for what he has "made" or "done".

== History ==
Asahel was the youngest son of David's sister Zeruiah (2 Samuel 2:18; 1 Chronicles 2:16). According to Josephus (Antiquaties, VII, 1, 3) his father was called Suri. Asahel's older brothers were Joab and Abishai. He was known for his swiftness of foot: "Asahel was swift of foot, like a gazelle in the open field, or like a wild deer." (cf. 2 Samuel 2:18) and was told that if he were running through wheat field, the stalks wouldn't bend. He was put to death by Abner, whom he pursued from the battlefield when fighting against Abner at Gibeon, in the army of his brother Joab, (cf. 2 Samuel 2:18–19). He is considered among David's thirty valiant men (cf. 2 Samuel 23:24; 1 Chronicles 11:26).

After a battle at Gibeon between Abner, commanding the army of Ish-bosheth son of Saul and Joab, commanding the army of David, Asahel pursued Abner while he attempted to escape. Young Asahel soon caught up with Abner. Abner begged Asahel to stop pursuing him, but when Asahel refused to desist, Abner thrust the blunt end of a spear through Asahel's stomach, and Asahel died on the spot (cf. 2 Samuel 2:23).

Although Joab won the battle, Abner escaped with his life; Asahel was buried in his father's tomb at Bethlehem. In retaliation, Joab murdered Abner with help from his brother Abishai, against the wishes of David.

According to 1 Chronicles 27:7, Asahel had a son named Zebadiah, who succeeded him in command of his military division after his death.
