= Zeruiah =

Sister of David

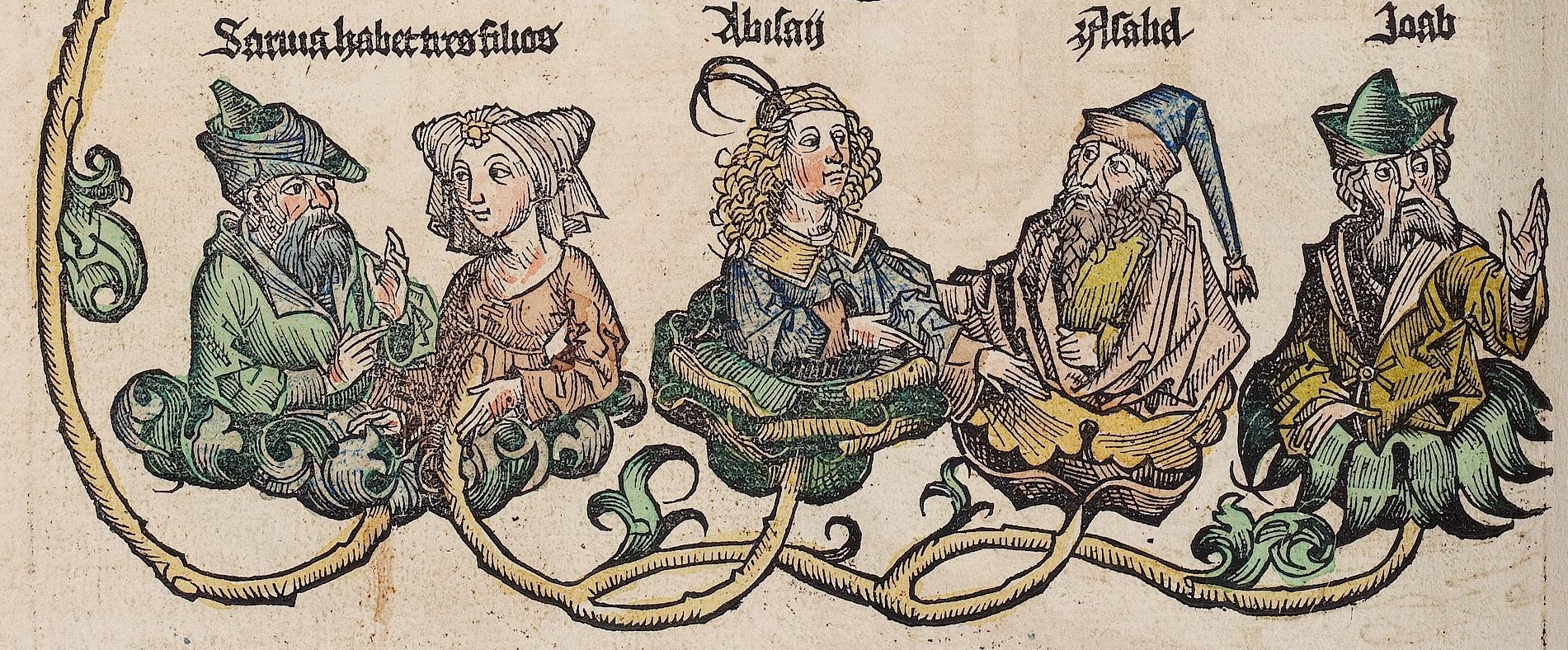
Zeruiah and her three sons depicted in Nuremberg Chronicles of Hartmann Schedel

Zeruiah (/zəˈruːjə/ צְרוּיָה sometimes transliterated Tzruya or Zeruya) was a sister of King David. According to both the Hebrew Bible and the Babylonian Talmud, Zeruiah was a daughter of Jesse and sister of Abigail, to whom reference is made in 1 Chronicles (1 Chronicles 2:13–17) and 2 Samuel (2 Samuel 17:25). Zeruiah had three sons, Abishai, Joab, and Asahel, David's nephews, all of whom were soldiers in David's army.

Very little is told of her. Nothing is told about her having a relationship with her brother David. However, her sons are invariably mentioned with the matronymic "son of Zeruiah", in marked contrast to most other Biblical characters (and people in many other cultures) who are known by a patronymic. This suggests that she was an exceptionally important person, though the specific circumstances are not given.

Her name is used, though not very frequently, as a female given name in modern Israel (see Tzruya Lahav, Zeruya Shalev).

== Sons ==
- Abishai
- Joab
- Asahel
