= Tribe of Benjamin =

One of the twelve Tribes of Israel

- Geographical range: West Asia
- Major sites: Jerusalem
- Preceded by: New Kingdom of Egypt
- Followed by: Kingdom of Israel (united monarchy)

According to the Torah, the Tribe of Benjamin (Hebrew: בִּנְיָמִן, romanized: Binyāmīn) was one of the Twelve Tribes of Israel. The tribe was descended from Benjamin, the youngest son of the patriarch Jacob (later given the name Israel) and his wife Rachel. In the Samaritan Pentateuch the name appears as Binyamēm (Samaritan Hebrew: ࠁࠪࠍࠬࠉࠣࠌࠜࠉࠌࠬ).

The Tribe of Benjamin, whose allocated territory was to the north of the Tribe of Judah but to the south of the later Kingdom of Israel, is significant in biblical narratives as a source of various Israelite leaders, including the first Israelite king, Saul, as well as earlier tribal leaders in the period of the Judges. In the period of the Judges, they feature in an episode in which a civil war results in their near-extinction as a tribe. After the brief period of the United Kingdom of Israel, Benjamin became part of the southern Kingdom of Judah following the split into two kingdoms. After the destruction of the northern kingdom, Benjamin was fully absorbed into the southern kingdom.

Members of the tribe are referred to as Benjamites or Benjaminites.

== Name ==
An account in Genesis explains the name of Benjamin due to the birth of the tribe's founder, Benjamin. According to Genesis, Benjamin was the result of a painful birth in which his mother died, naming him Ben-Oni, "son of my pain", immediately before her death. Instead, Jacob, his father, preferred to call him Benjamin, which can be read in Hebrew as meaning, "son of my right [hand]" (Genesis 35:16–18). In geographical terms, Benjamin can be read as "son of the south" from the perspective of the northern Kingdom of Israel, as the Benjamite territory was at the southern edge of the northern kingdom.

=== Family tree ===
				Benjamin
Bela	Beker	Ashbel	Gera	Naaman	Ehi	Rosh	Muppim	Huppim	Ard

== Biblical narrative ==
From after the conquest of the Promised Land by Joshua until the formation of the first Kingdom of Israel, the Tribe of Benjamin was a part of a loose confederation of Israelite tribes. No central government existed, and in times of crisis the people were led by ad hoc leaders known as Judges (see shophetim and the Book of Judges).

=== Battle of Gibeah ===
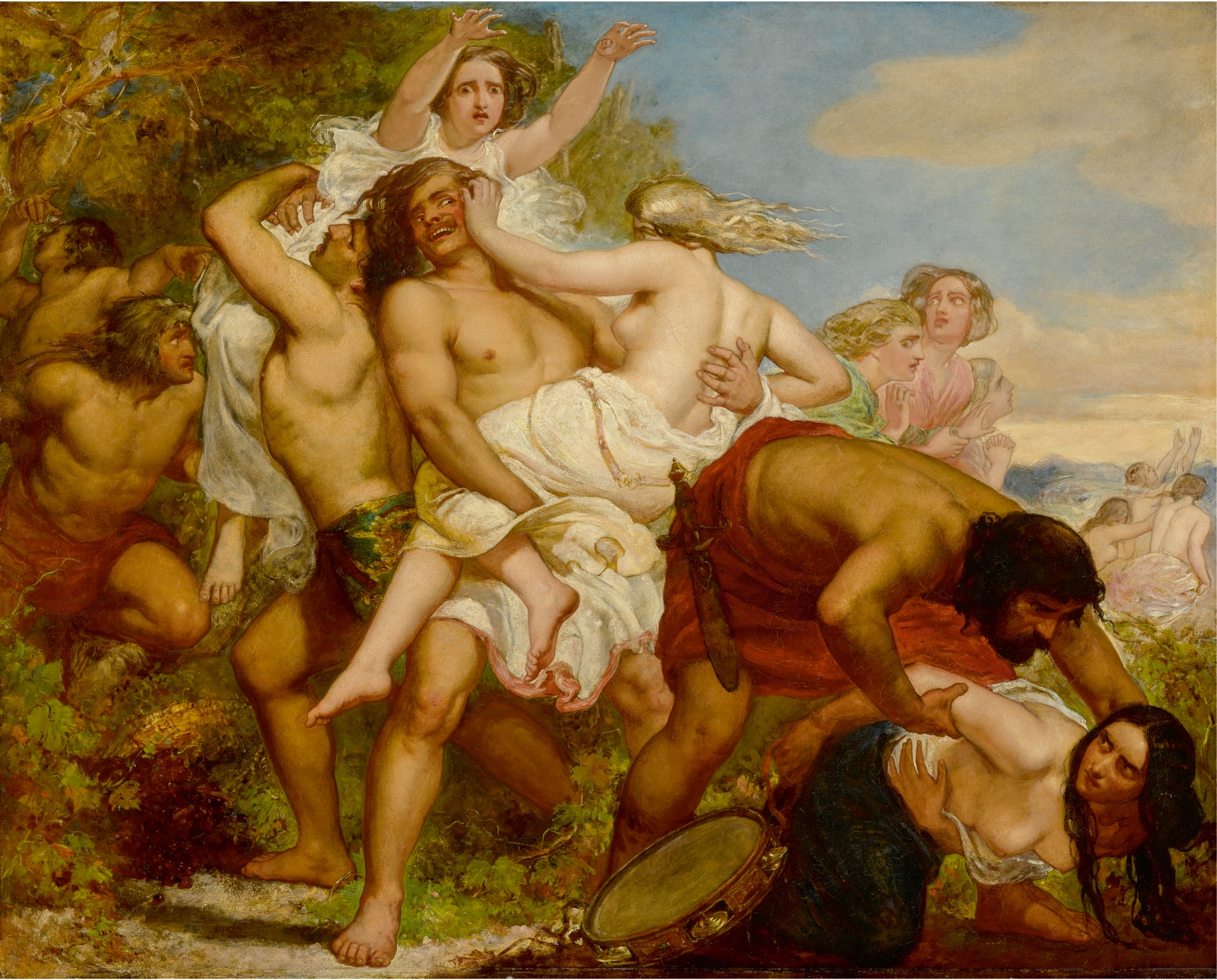
The Tribe of Benjamin Seizing the Daughter of Shiloh by John Everett Millais, 1847

The Book of Judges recounts that the rape of the concubine of a member of the tribe of Levi by a gang from the tribe of Benjamin resulted in a battle at Gibeah, in which the other tribes of Israel sought vengeance, and after which members of Benjamin were killed, including women and children. Almost the entire tribe of Benjamin was wiped out by the other Israelites. Six hundred men from the tribe of Benjamin survived by hiding in a cave for four months. The text refers several times to the Benjaminite warriors as "men of valour" despite their defeat.

The other Israelite tribes were grieved at the near loss of the tribe of Benjamin. They decided to allow these 600 men to carry on the tribe of Benjamin, but no one was willing to give their daughter in marriage to them because they had vowed not to. To get around this, they provided wives for the men by killing the men from Jabesh-Gilead who had not shown concern for the almost lost tribe of Benjamin as they did not come to grieve with the rest of Israel. Four hundred virgin women from Jabesh-Gilead were found and given in marriage to the Benjaminite men. There were still 200 men who were without a wife, so it was agreed that they could go to an Israelite festival, hide in the vineyards, and wait for the young unmarried women to come out and dance. They then grabbed a wife each and took her back to their land and rebuilt their houses (Judges 19–21).

=== United Kingdom of Israel ===
Responding to a growing threat from Philistine incursions, the Israelite tribes formed a strong, centralised monarchy during the eleventh century BC. The first king of this new entity was Saul, from the tribe of Benjamin (1 Samuel 9:1–2), which at the time was the smallest of the tribes. He reigned from Gibeah for 38 years (1 Samuel 8:31).

After Saul died, all the tribes other than Judah remained loyal to the House of Saul and to Ish-bosheth, Saul's son and successor to the throne of Israel, but war ensued between the House of Saul and the House of David. The account in 2 Samuel 3 stresses that Israel's military commander Abner, negotiating with the tribes to secure a peace treaty with David, then king of Judah, held talks specifically with the house of Benjamin to secure their support. The Cambridge Bible for Schools and Colleges suggests that the tribe of Benjamin "was the most likely to offer opposition [to Abner] through fear of losing dignity and advantage by the transference of the royal house to the tribe of Judah".

=== Later history ===
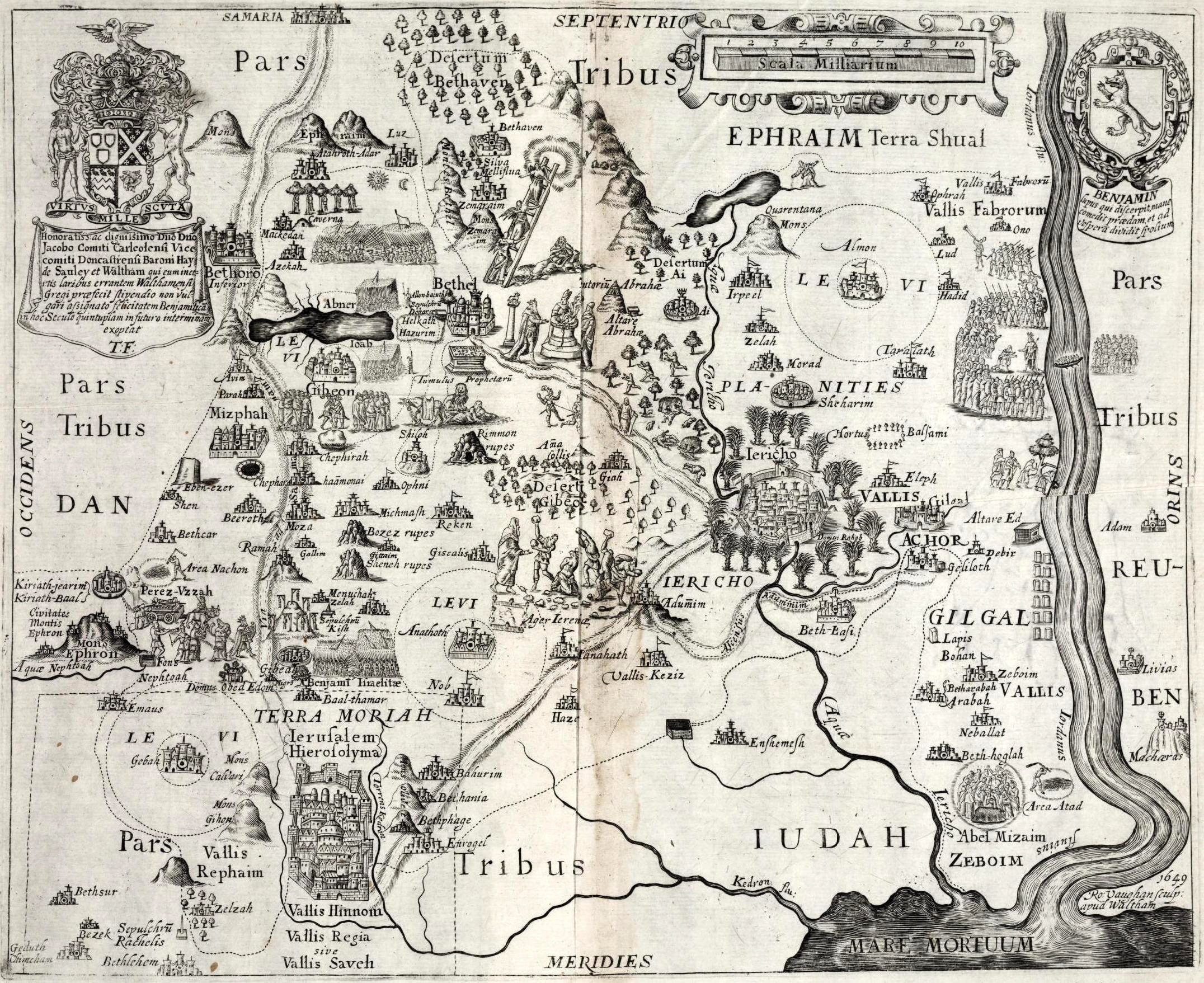
Map of the territory of Benjamin. Note the area around the cities allotted to the Tribe of Levi, per Numbers 35:4–5.

After the death of Ish-bosheth, the tribe of Benjamin joined the northern Israelite tribes in making David king of the united Kingdom of Israel and Judah. On the accession of Rehoboam, David's grandson, in c. 930 BCE, the united Kingdom of Israel dissolved with the northern tribes splitting from the House of David to constitute the northern Kingdom of Israel. The Tribe of Benjamin remained a part of the southern Kingdom of Judah.

The Davidic dynasty, which had roots in Judah, continued to reign in Judah. As part of the Kingdom of Judah, Benjamin escaped the destruction of the northern kingdom by the Assyrians in c. 740 BCE. The Kingdom of Judah, that included Benjamin, continued until it was conquered by Babylon in c. 586 BCE and the population deported, and was subjected to the Babylonian captivity. When the captivity ended, the distinction between Benjamin and Judah was lost in favour of a common identity as Judah, though in the biblical book of Esther, Mordecai is referred to as being of the tribe of Benjamin, and as late as the time of Jesus of Nazareth some (notably Paul the Apostle) still identified their Benjamite ancestry:

If anyone else thinks he may have confidence in the flesh, I more so: circumcised on the eighth day, of the stock of Israel, of the tribe of Benjamin, a Hebrew of the Hebrews; concerning the law, a Pharisee; concerning zeal, persecuting the church; concerning the righteousness which is in the law, blameless.

== Character ==
Several passages in the Bible describe the tribe of Benjamin as being pugnacious, for example in the Song of Deborah, and in descriptions where they are described as being left handed fighters, (Judges 3:15–21, 20:16, 1 Chronicles 12:2) and where they are portrayed as being brave and skilled archers (1 Chronicles 8:40, 2 Chronicles 14:8).

In the Blessing of Jacob, Benjamin is referred to as "a ravenous wolf"; traditional interpretations often considered this to refer to the might of a specific member of the tribe, either the champion Ehud, King Saul, or Mordecai of the Esther narrative, or in Christian circles, the apostle Paul. The Temple in Jerusalem was traditionally said to be partly in the territory of the Tribe of Benjamin (but mostly in that of Judah), and some traditional interpretations of the Blessing consider the ravenous wolf to refer to the Temple's altar which devoured biblical sacrifices.

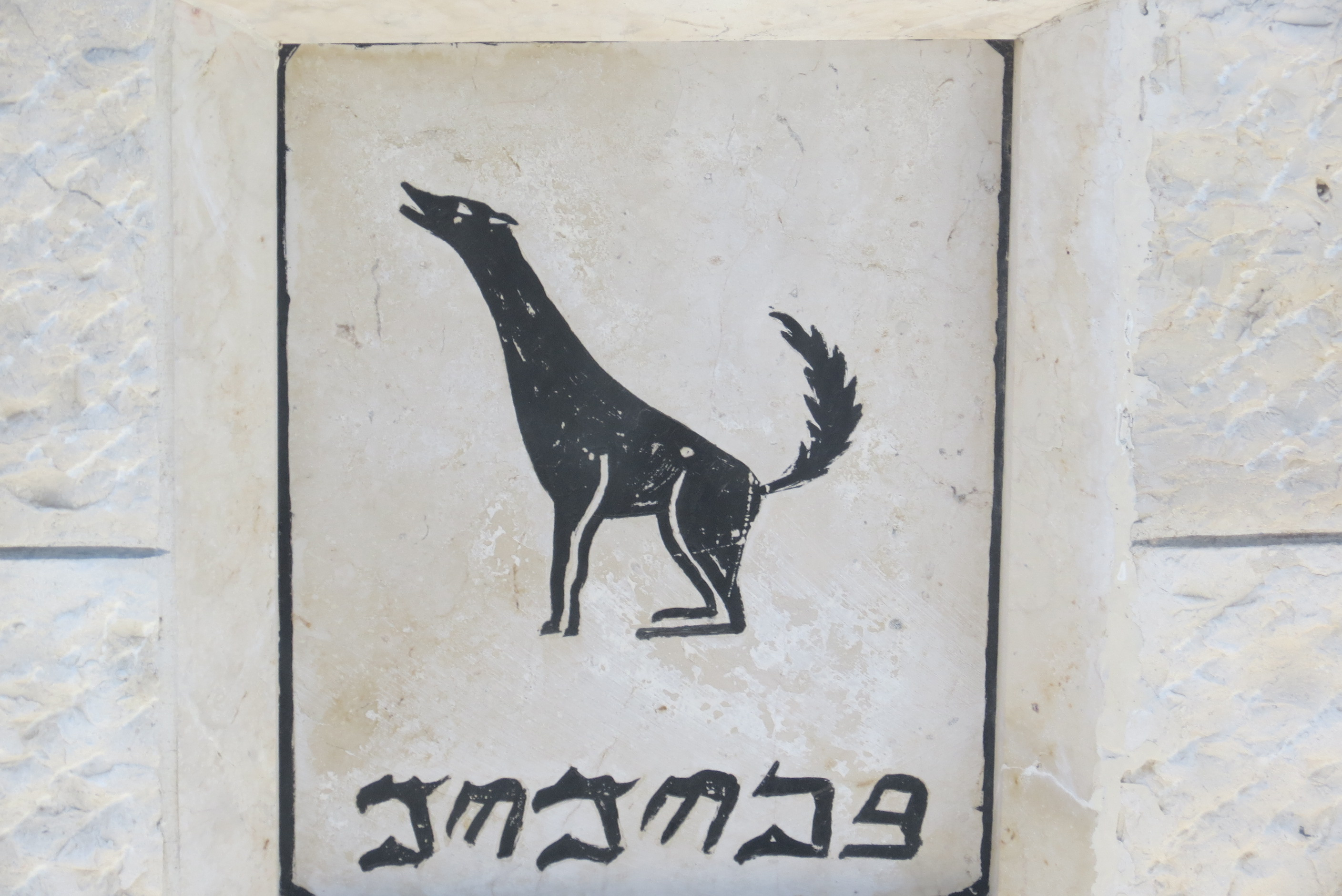
A Samaritan mural on Mount Gerizim representing the Tribe of Benjamin, showing the wolf symbol. The word "Benjamin" or "Benyamim" in Samaritan Hebrew, appears in the Samaritan script.

== Territory ==
According to the Hebrew Bible, following the completion of the conquest of Canaan by the Israelites, Joshua allocated the land among the twelve tribes. Kenneth Kitchen dates this conquest to just after 1200 BCE. However the consensus of modern scholars is that the conquest as described in the book of Joshua did not occur.

The Bible recounts that Joshua assigned to Benjamin the territory between that of the Tribe of Ephraim to the north and Judah to the south, with the Jordan River as the eastern border, and included many historically important cities, such as Bethel and Gibeah, and encroached on the northern hills of Jerusalem. (Joshua 18:11–28)

As to the Benjamites, their lot fell so, that its length reached from the river Jordan to the sea; but in breadth it was bounded by Jerusalem and Bethel; and this lot was the narrowest of all, by reason of the goodness of the land; for it included Jericho and the city of Jerusalem.

According to rabbinical sources, only those towns and villages on the northernmost and southernmost territorial boundary lines, or purlieu, are named in the land allocation. In actuality, all unnamed towns and villages in between these boundaries would still belong to the tribe of Benjamin. The Babylonian Talmud names three of these cities, all of which were formerly enclosed by a wall, and belonged to the tribe of Benjamin: Lod, Ono (Kafr 'Ana), and Gei Ha-ḥarashim. Marking what is now one of the southernmost butts and bounds of Benjamin's territory is "the spring of the waters of Nephtoah" (Joshua 18:15), a place identified as Kefar Lifta (كفر لفتا), and situated on the left-hand side of the road as one enters Jerusalem. It is now an abandoned Arab village. The word Lifta is merely a corruption of the Hebrew name Nephtoah, where a natural spring still abounds.

Although Jerusalem was in the territory allocated to the tribe of Benjamin (Joshua 18:28), it remained under the independent control of the Jebusites. Judges 1:21 points to the city being within the territory of Benjamin, while Joshua 15:63 implies that the city was within the territory of Judah. In any event, Jerusalem remained an independent Jebusite city until it was finally conquered by David in c. 11th century BC and made into the capital of the united Kingdom of Israel. After the breakup of the united monarchy, Jerusalem continued as the capital of the southern Kingdom of Judah.

The ownership of Bethel is also ambiguous. Though Joshua allocated Bethel to Benjamin, by the time of the prophetess Deborah, Bethel is described as being in the land of Ephraim (Judges 4:5). Then, according to the book of Chronicles, some twenty years after the breakup of the united monarchy, Abijah, the second king of Judah, defeated Jeroboam of Israel and took back the towns of Bethel, Jeshanah and Ephron, with their surrounding villages. Ephron is believed to be the Ophrah that was also allocated to the Tribe of Benjamin by Joshua.

The Blessing of Moses, portrayed in the Bible as a prophecy by Moses about the future situation of the twelve tribes, describes Benjamin as "dwelling between YHWH's shoulders", in reference to its location between the leading tribe of the Kingdom of Israel (Ephraim), and the leading tribe (Judah) of the Kingdom of Judah.

== Rabbinic literature ==
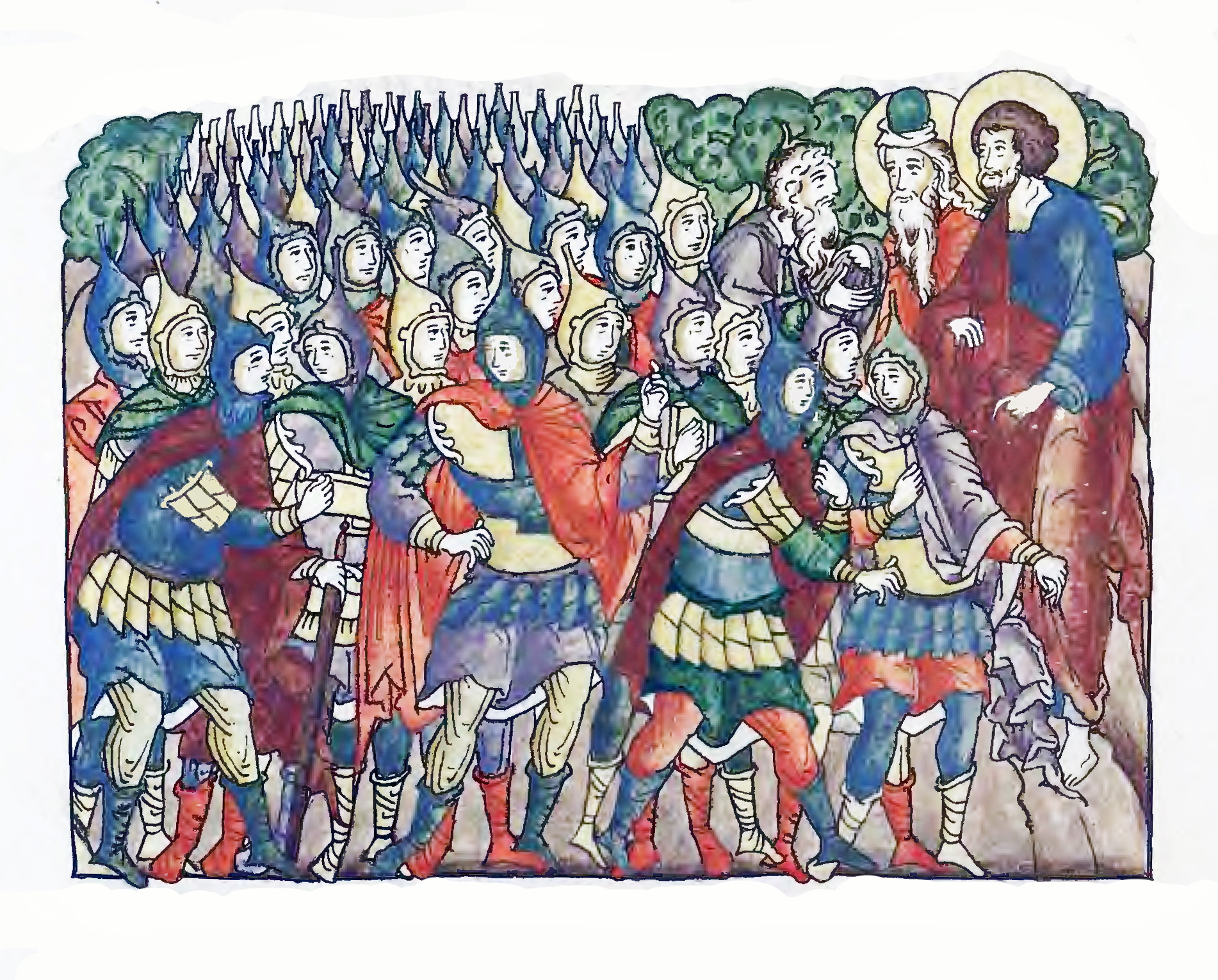
Moses counting Benjamin's kin

The name "Benjamin" is given various meanings by the Rabbis. According to some, is equivalent to ("son of days"), because Benjamin was born to his father in his old age (Testament of the Twelve Patriarchs, Benjamin i. υἱὸσ ἡμερῶν; Midrash Leḳaḥ-Ṭob; and Rashi, ed. Berliner, on Gen. xxxv. 18). Other rabbis interpret the name Benjamin as "son of the South," since he was the only son born to Jacob in Israel, the others having been born in Mesopotamia, north of Israel (Rashi ad loc.; "Sefer ha-Yashar," Wayishlaḥ, ed. Leghorn, p. 56b). Benjamin was not granted to his parents until after Rachel had prayed and fasted for a second son a long time (Testament of the Twelve Patriarchs, l.c.; Num. R. xiv. 8), and not until Jacob was one hundred years old (Testament of the Twelve Patriarchs, ib.; "Sefer ha-Yashar," Wayishlaḥ, ib.; compare Heilprin, "Seder ha-Dorot," i. 52, ed. Warsaw).

Benjamin, Joseph's brother, took no part in the selling of Joseph (Sifre, Deut. 352); and in order to comfort Benjamin concerning his brother's fate, God showed him, while awake, Joseph's form and countenance (Testament of the Twelve Patriarchs, Benjamin x.; compare Tan., ed. Buber, Wayesheb, 8).When Benjamin was detained as the alleged thief of the cup, Joseph pretended that Benjamin had been instigated by his brothers. But Benjamin swore: "As truly as my brother Joseph is separated from me, as truly as he has been made a slave, I have not touched the cup, and my brothers did not want to make me steal." When asked for a proof that his brother's memory was so sacred that Joseph must believe this oath, Benjamin told Joseph how he had given his ten sons (Gen. xlvi. 21) names which referred to the loss of his brother. The first was called Belah ("swallow"), because Joseph had disappeared; the second, Becher, because Joseph was his mother's first-born; the third, Ashbel ("capture"), because Joseph was made a captive; the fourth, Gera, because he lived in a foreign land; the fifth, Naaman (grace), on account of Joseph's graceful speech; the sixth, Eḥi ("my only full brother"); the seventh, Rosh ("the older"); the eighth, Muppim ("double mouth") because Joseph taught Benjamin the things he himself had learned from his father; the ninth, Ḥuppim ("whose wedding I have not seen"); and the tenth, Ard, because Joseph was like a rose.

Benjamin's oath touched Joseph so deeply that he could no longer pretend to be a stranger, and so revealed himself to his brother (Tan., ed. Buber, Wayiggash, 7; the meanings of the names are also given in Soṭah 36b; Gen. R. xciv. 8). According to another Haggadah (known to so early a work as the Testament of the Twelve Patriarchs, Benjamin ii.), Joseph makes himself known to Benjamin before his reconciliation with the other brothers. The "Sefer ha-Yashar" (Miḳḳeẓ 89) narrates that Joseph caused a kind of astrolabe to be brought, and asked Benjamin whether he could not discover by means of the instrument the whereabouts of his lost brother. To Joseph's astonishment Benjamin declared that the man on the throne was his brother, and Joseph revealed himself to Benjamin, telling him what he meant to do with the brothers. His intention was to try them and thus to learn whether they would act in a brotherly manner toward Benjamin if he were in danger of losing his liberty.

The Rabbis lay stress on the name, "beloved of the Lord," by which Benjamin is distinguished (Deut. xxxiii. 12; Sifre, l.c.). He is counted among the four men who died by the poison of the serpent in Paradise; i.e., without sin of his own, the other three being Amram, the father of Moses; Jesse, the father of David; and Kileab, the son of David (Shab. 55b). His comparison to the ravening wolf (Cant. R. to viii. 1), "who devours his enemy" (Gen. xlix. 27) is referred to the men of Shiloh who stole their wives (Judges xxi.) or to Ehud or to Saul. By others it is referred to Mordecai and Esther (Gen. R. xcix. and Tan., Wayeḥi, 14; so also in the original text of the Testaments of the Twelve Patriarchs [Benjamin ii]; whereas a Christian interpolation refers it to Paul).

One interpretation refers the blessing to the early ripening of the fruits in the territory of Benjamin, and the great fertility of the region of Jericho and Beth-el, and another refers the expression "wolf" to the altar of the Temple, which devoured the sacrifices in the morning and in the evening (Gen. R. l.c.; Targ. O. and Yer.).

The Tribe of Benjamin. The erection of the Temple on Benjamitic ground is explained in several ways. It is related that Benjamin (Sifre, Deut. 352, ed. Friedmann, 146a) was privileged to have the Shekinah dwell in his territory because all the other tribes (that is, fathers of the tribes) had taken part in the selling of Joseph. For God said: "If they—the Israelites—build me a Temple in some other place and seek my mercy, I can show them as little mercy as they showed their brother Joseph." Origen ("In Genesim," xlii. 6), gives another reason, probably based on Jewish tradition (compare Esther R. on iii. 4), viz.: Because Benjamin did not bow down before Esau as did his brothers and his father (Gen. xxxiii. 3–7), nor before Joseph (ib. xlii. 6), his territory was reserved for the worship of God.

The descendants of Benjamin, it is true, did not always show themselves worthy of their ancestor, especially in connection with the incident at Gibeah (Judges xix.). In spite of their wrong-doing the Benjamites were at first victorious (Judges xx. 21–25); but this was due to God's anger against all Israel because they had attacked all Benjamin on account of the crime of an individual, and at the same time quietly tolerated the idolatry which Micah (Judges xvii.) was spreading among them (Pirḳe R. El. xxxviii.). At first the intention of the other tribes was to efface Benjamin completely, since the number of twelve tribes could be preserved through Ephraim and Manasseh; but they remembered God's promise to Jacob shortly before Benjamin's birth (Gen. xxxv. 11), that "a nation and a company of nations shall be of him"; and they decided that the existence of the tribe of Benjamin was necessary (Yer. Ta'anit iv. 69c; Lam. R., lntroduction, 33). The day on which the reconciliation took place between the tribes is said to have been the fifteenth of Ab, and for this reason it was made a festive day (ib.; compare Ab, Fifteenth Day of). On another occasion, however, the Benjamites showed themselves worthy of their pious ancestor. When, at the Red Sea, all the other tribes stood in desperation only the tribe of Benjamin trusted in God and leaped into the sea (Mekilta, Beshallaḥ, Wayiḳra 5; Sotah 36b).

== See also ==
- Benjamin
- Tribal allotments of Israel
