= Abishai (biblical figure) =

General and military leader

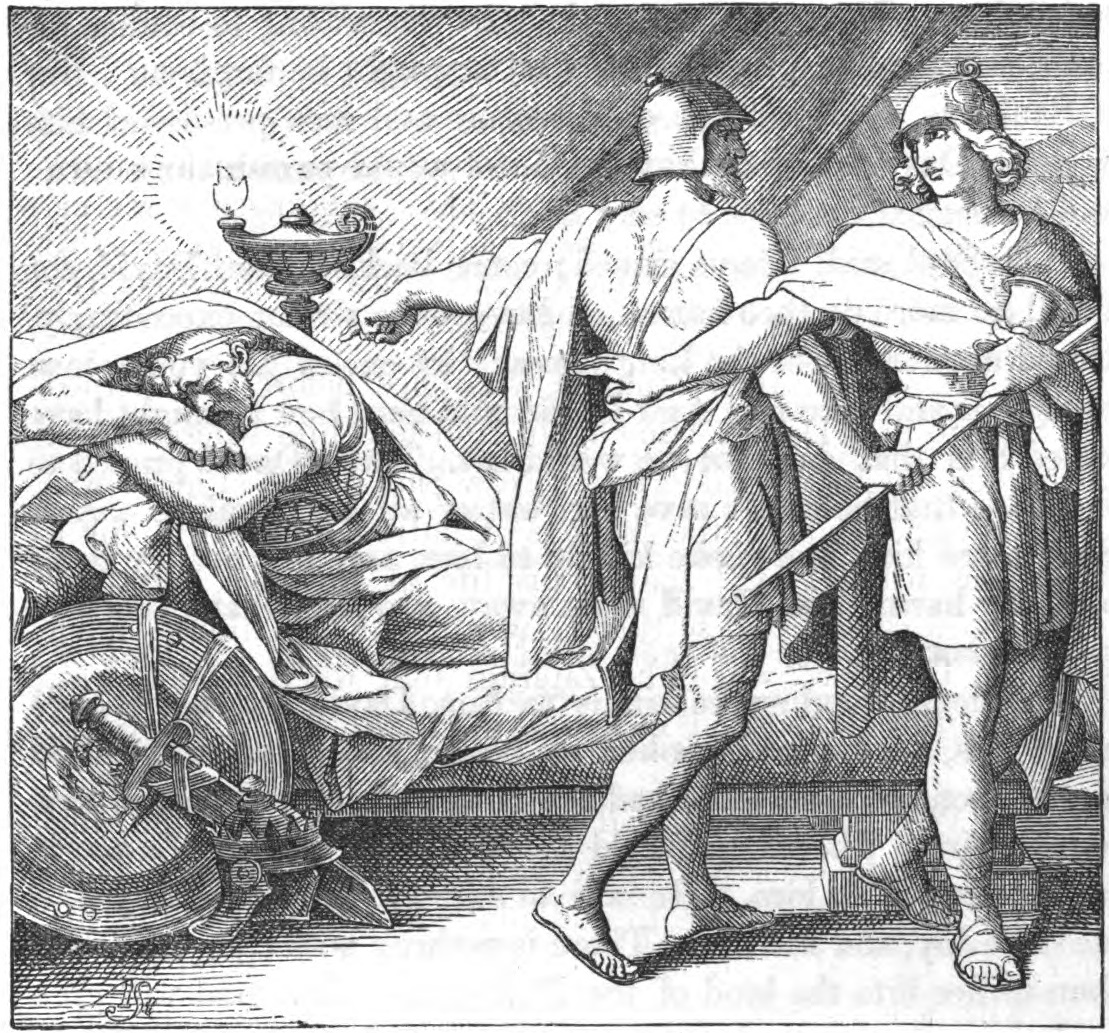
An 1873 illustration of Abishai (centre) encouraging David (right) to strike Saul.

Abishai (Biblical Hebrew: אֲבִישַׁי, romanized: Avishai) was a military leader under the biblical King David. He was the eldest son of David's sister, Zeruiah. According to Josephus (Antiquities, VII, 1, 3) his father was called Suri. The meaning of his name is "Father of a gift". He was the brother of Joab and Asahel.

Abishai was the only one who accompanied David when he went to the camp of Saul and took the spear and water bottle from Saul as he slept.

After a battle between Judah and Israel, his brother Asahel chased the northern army's general Abner, and was killed by the back of Abner's spear. Joab and Abishai were enraged at the death of Asahel, and later murdered Abner. David disowned responsibility for the murder, led a national lament for Abner, and pronounced a curse on Joab and Abishai, saying, "these men the sons of Zeruiah are too hard for me; the LORD reward the evildoer according to his wickedness."

Abishai had the command of one of the three divisions of David's army at the battle with Absalom. He was the commander and "most honoured" of the second rank of David's officers, below the three "mighty men". On one occasion, he withstood 300 men and slew them with his own spear.

Abishai slew the Philistine giant Ishbi-benob, who threatened David's life. In the Aggadah, this incident is elaborated with miraculous details. The Sanhedrin tractate in the Talmud says that Orpah (mother of Goliath and Ishbi-benob) was killed by King David's general Abishai, the son of Zeruiah, with her own spindle.

== Other people with the name Abishai ==
Abisha or Abishai is also the name of the Semitic chief who offers gifts to the lord of Beni-Hassan in an inscription at that site in Middle Egypt.
