= Eliphalet =

Eliphalet (/əˈlaɪfəlɛt/, Hebrew: אֱלִיפֶלֶט, romanized: Elifelet) is a Biblical Hebrew masculine name. The name "Eliphalet"/"Elifelet" belongs to several characters in the Hebrew Bible, for example one of the sons of King David (2 Samuel 5:16, 1 Chronicles 3:8) and a repatriate after the Babylonian Captivity (Ezra 8:13). Notable people with the name include:

- Eliphalet Adams (1677–1753), American minister
- Eliphalet Austin, businessman with the Connecticut Land Company
- Eliphalet Ball (1722–1797), American Presbyterian minister
- Eliphalet Wickes Blatchford (1826–1915), American businessman and manufacturer
- Eliphalet Williams Bliss (1836–1903), American manufacturer and inventor
- Eliphalet Adams Bulkeley (1804–1872), American businessman
- Eliphalet Chapin (1741–1807), American furniture maker
- Eliphalet Daniels (1713–1799), British Colonial America-born American military leader
- Eliphalet Dyer (1721–1807), American statesman and judge
- Eliphalet Frazer Andrews (1835–1914), American painter
- Eliphalet Lockwood (1741–1814), American Revolutionary War militiaman and politician
- Eliphalet Lockwood (deacon) (1675–1753), American politician and deacon from Connecticut
- Eliphalet Oram Lyte (1842–1913), American educator, author, and textbook creator
- Eliphalet S. Miner (1818–1890), American politician from Wisconsin
- Eliphalet Nott (1773–1866), President of Union College from 1804 to 1866
- Eliphalet Pearson (1752–1826), American educator; acting President of Harvard University
- Eliphalet Remington (1793–1861), gunsmith and founder of Remington Arms
- Eliphalet Stone (1825-1905), American politician from Wisconsin
- Eliphalet Trask (1806–1890), American politician from Massachusetts
- Eliphalet Wickes (1769–1850), member of the United States House of Representatives from New York

== See also ==
- Elifelet
