= Joab =

Nephew of King David of Israel and commander of his army

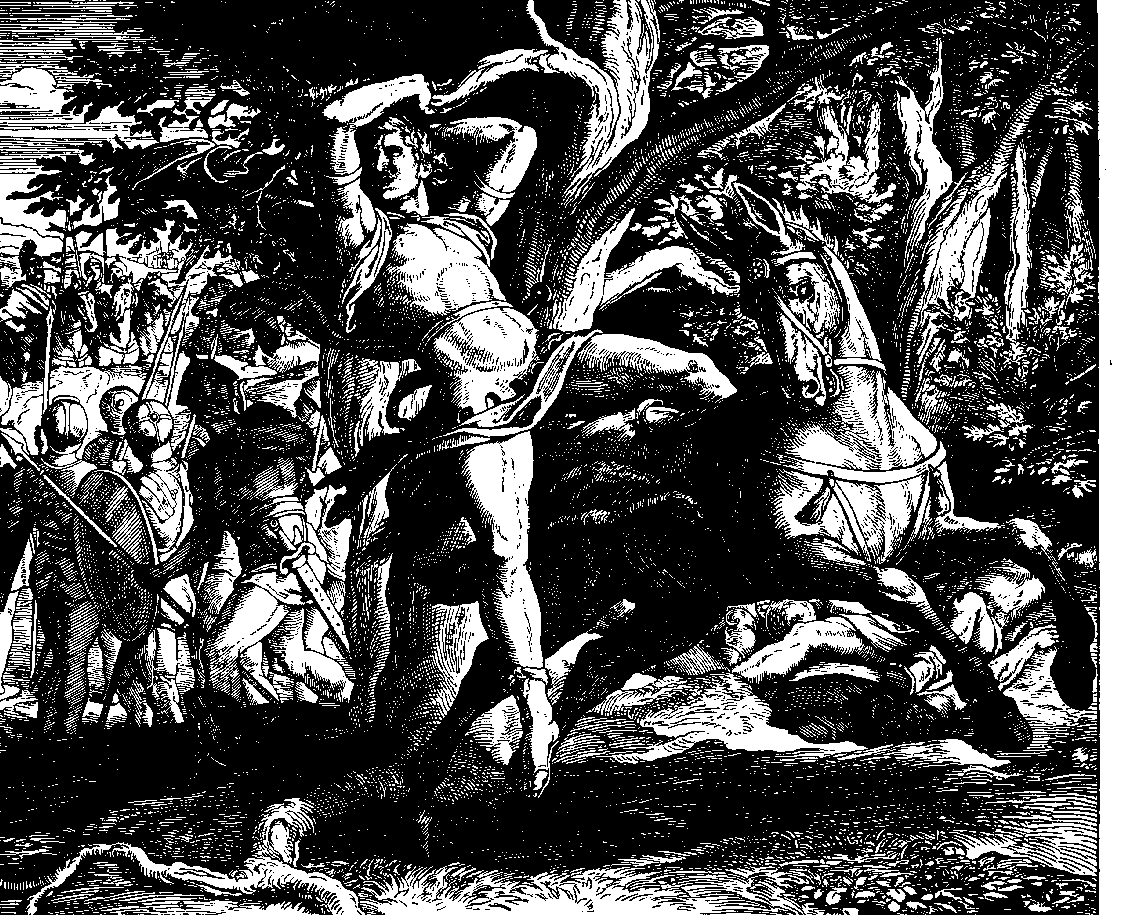
Death of Absalom, 1860 woodcut by Julius Schnorr von Carolsfeld. Joab is depicted directly to the left of Absalom.

Joab (/ˈdʒoʊæb/; Biblical Hebrew: יוֹאָב, romanized: Yoʼāḇ), the son of Zeruiah, was the nephew of King David and the commander of his army according to the Hebrew Bible.

== Name ==
The name Joab is, like many other Hebrew names, theophoric—derived from Yahweh (יהוה), the name of the God of Israel, and the Hebrew word "father" (אָב). It therefore means "Yahweh [is] the Father".

== Life ==
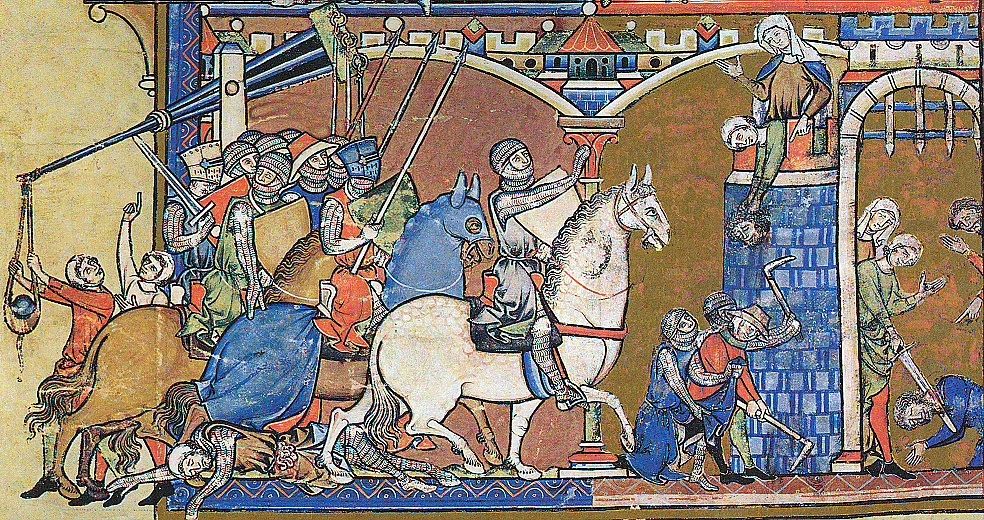
Illustration from the Morgan Bible of a story in 2 Samuel 20 of Joab pursuing Sheba as far as Abel-beth-maachah and Sheba's head being thrown down to him

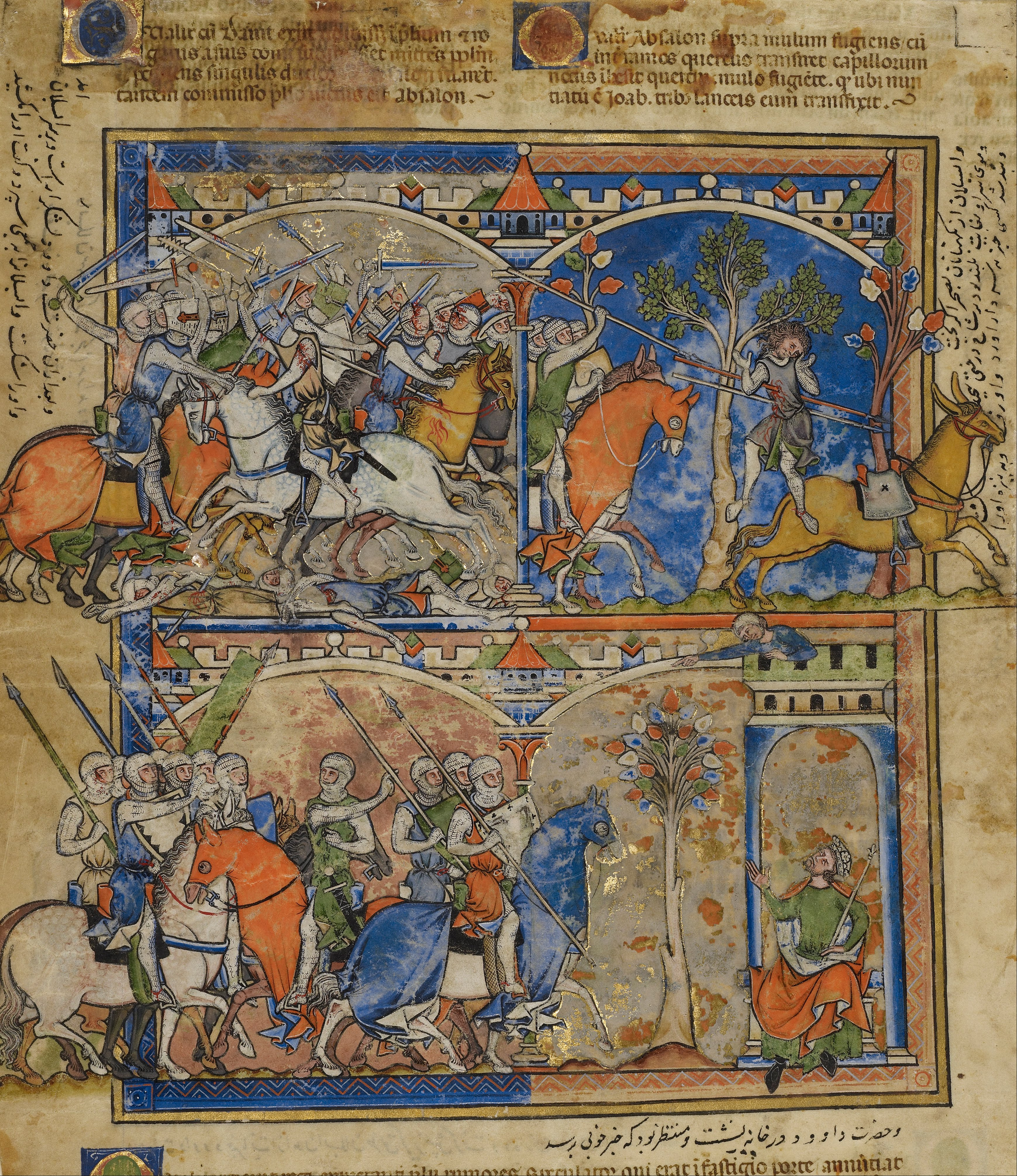
Leaf from the Morgan Picture Bible, "Scenes from the Life of Absalom", c. 1250

Joab was the son of Zeruiah, a sister of king David (1 Chronicles 2:15–16). According to Josephus (Antiquities VII, 1, 3) his father was called Suri.

Joab had two brothers, Abishai and Asahel. Asahel was killed by Abner in combat, for which Joab took revenge by murdering Abner against David's wishes and shortly after David and Abner had secured peace between the House of David and the House of Saul (2 Samuel 2:13–3:21; 3:27).

While 2 Samuel 3:27 explicitly states that Joab killed Abner "to avenge the blood of his brother Asahel", Josephus (Antiquities VII, 1, 3) paints a different picture: Joab had forgiven Abner for the death of Joab's brother Asahel, since Abner had slain Asahel honorably in combat, but killed Abner as a potential threat to his rank after Abner had switched to the side of David and granted David control over the tribe of Benjamin.

After Joab led the assault on the fortress of Mount Zion, David made him captain of his army (2 Samuel 8:16; 20:23; 1 Chronicles 11:4–6; 18:15; 27:34). He led the army against Aram, Ammon, Moab and Edom. He also colluded with David in the murder of Uriah (2 Samuel 11:14–25).

Joab played a pivotal role as the commander of David's forces during Absalom's rebellion. Absalom, one of David's sons, rallied much of Israel in rebellion against David, who was forced to flee with only his most trusted men. However, David could not bring himself to harm his son, and ordered that none of his men should kill Absalom during the ensuing battle. However, when a man reported that Absalom had been found alive and caught in a tree, Joab and his men killed him (2 Samuel 18:1–33).

Hearing of David's grief over the reported death of Absalom, Joab confronted and admonished David. The king followed Joab's advice to make a public appearance to encourage his troops (2 Samuel 19:1–8).

David later replaced him as commander of the army with his nephew Amasa (2 Samuel 19:14), but Joab treacherously killed Amasa (2 Samuel 20:8–13; 1 Kings 2:5) and regained his position.

Joab and other commanders began questioning David's judgment (2 Samuel 24:2–4). As David neared the end of his reign, Joab offered his allegiance to David's eldest living son, Adonijah, rather than to the eventual king, Solomon (1 Kings 1:1–27).

On the brink of death, David told Solomon to have Joab killed, citing Joab's past betrayals and the blood that he was guilty of. Solomon ordered Joab's death by the hand of Benaiah (1 Kings 2:29–34). Hearing this, Joab fled to the Tent of the Tabernacle (where Adonijah had previously sought successful refuge according to 1 Kings 1:50–53) and told Benaiah that he would die there. Benaiah killed Joab there and thereby replaced him as commander of the army. Joab was buried in 'the wilderness' (1 Kings 2:34).

== Commentary ==
The ATS Bible Dictionary describes Joab as "a valiant warrior, and an able general; and his great influence on public affairs was often exerted for good, as in the rebellion of Absalom, and the numbering of Israel ... [b]ut as a man he was imperious, revengeful, and unscrupulous".

== See also ==
- Joab in rabbinic literature
