= Ish-bosheth =

Biblical figure and Israelite monarch

Ish-Bosheth 𐤀𐤉𐤔𐤁𐤔𐤕 אִישׁ־בֹּשֶׁת
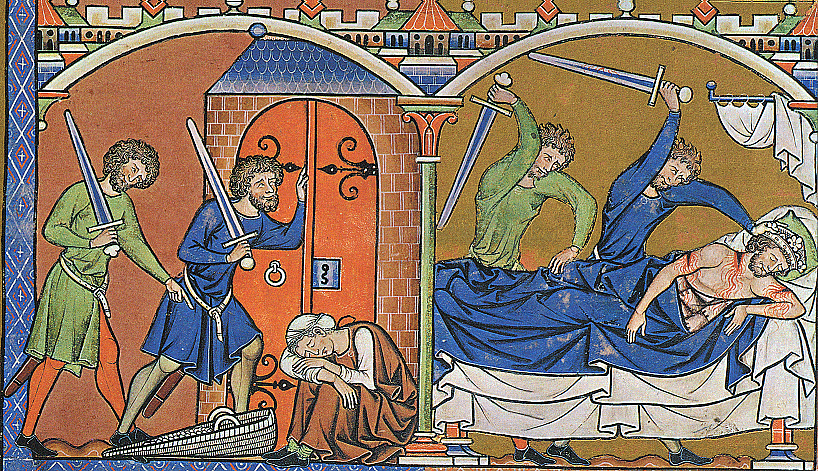
- Illustration from the Morgan Bible depicting the death of Ish-bosheth

King of Israel
- Predecessor: Saul
- Successor: David
- House: House of Saul
- Father: Saul

Ish-Bosheth (Hebrew: אִישׁ־בֹּשֶׁת, romanized: ʾîš-bōšeṯ, lit. 'man of shame'), also called Eshbaal (אֶשְׁבַּעַל, ʾEšbaʿal, 'man of Baal') was, according to the Hebrew Bible, the son of Saul who, after his father's death, ascended to the throne and reigned for two years.

During his reign, Ish-Bosheth engaged in a protracted conflict with David, who had been anointed as Saul's successor by the prophet Samuel. This rivalry between the two leaders shaped the kingdom's political landscape at the time. The Hebrew Bible recounts that Ish-Bosheth's reign was marked by war with David's forces, as both factions vied for control and legitimacy. According to biblical accounts, he was killed by two of his own army captains, Baanah and Rechab, who believed that assassinating Ish-Bosheth would earn them favour with David. This act not only brought an early end to Ish-Bosheth's rule but also played a significant role in the subsequent unification of the kingdom under David's leadership.

== Biblical narrative ==
In the biblical account, Abner, the captain of Saul's army, proclaimed Ish-Bosheth king over Israel at Mahanaim in Transjordan (2 Samuel 2:8), after the slaying of Ish-Bosheth's father and brothers in the battle of Gilboa (1 Samuel 31:1). Ish-Bosheth was 40 years old at this time and reigned for two years (2 Samuel 2:10). 1 Samuel 20:31 indicates Saul's intent that the throne go to his son Jonathan, son of Saul's wife Ahinoam. Ish-Bosheth's mother is unnamed in the Bible, and he was not counted among the sons of Saul's household in 1 Chronicles 10:2,6.

However, after the death of King Saul, the tribe of Judah seceded from the rule of the House of Saul by proclaiming David as its king (2 Samuel 2:4), and war ensued (2 Samuel 2:12). David's faction eventually prevailed against Ish-Bosheth's (2 Samuel 3:1), but the war continued until Abner joined David (2 Samuel 3:6).

Before the death of Saul, David had been married to Saul's daughter Michal, Ish-Bosheth's sister, until Saul and David had a falling-out and Saul gave her to another man (1 Samuel 25:44). Later, at the conclusion of the war with Ish-Bosheth, David's terms for peace required returning Michal to him, and Ish-Bosheth complied (2 Samuel 3:14). After Abner's death, Ish-Bosheth seems to have given up hope of retaining power (2 Samuel 4:1).

Two of Ish-Bosheth's own army-captains, Rechab and Baanah, assassinated the deposed king, (2 Samuel 4:5) expecting a reward from David for this. David, however, refused to give any commendation for high treason; he had both killers executed and their hands and feet cut off. David's supporters buried the head of Ish-Bosheth in Abner's grave at Hebron (2 Samuel 4:12).

== Problem of naming ==
The names Ish-Bosheth and Eshbaal have ambiguous meanings in the original Hebrew. In Hebrew, Ish-Bosheth means "Man of shame". He is also called Eshbaal, in Hebrew meaning "Baal exists", or "fire of Baal".

Critical scholarship suggests that Bosheth was a substitute for Baʿal, beginning when Baʿal became an unspeakable word; as (in the opposite direction) Adonai became substituted for the ineffable Tetragrammaton (see Euphemism § Pronunciation (phonetic modification)).

=== As Ish-Bosheth ===
He is exclusively called Ish-Bosheth in the Books of Samuel in the Old Testament:

Now Abner the son of Ner, captain of Saul's host, had taken Ish-bosheth the son of Saul, and brought him over to Mahanaim; and he made him king over Gilead, and over the Ashurites, and over Jezreel, and over Ephraim, and over Benjamin, and over all Israel. Ish-bosheth Saul's son was forty years old when he began to reign over Israel, and he reigned two years.

— 2 Samuel 2:8–10, Jewish Publication Society, 1917

When he was assassinated and King David punished the killers:

... Rechab and Baanah, went, and came about the heat of the day to the house of Ish-bosheth, as he took his rest at noon, and they came into the house, as though they would have fetched wheat; and they struck him in the groin; and Rechab and Baanah his brother escaped. ... And they brought the head of Ish-bosheth to David in Hebron, and said to the king: "Behold the head of Ish-bosheth the son of Saul your enemy, who sought your life; and the Lord has avenged my lord the king this day of Saul, and of his seed." ... And David answered ... "shall I not now require his blood of your hand, and take you away from the earth?" ... But they took the head of Ish-bosheth, and buried it in the grave of Abner in Hebron.

— 2 Samuel 4:5–12

=== As Eshbaal ===
Meanwhile, in the Books of Chronicles, he is exclusively called Eshbaal:

And Ner begot Kish; and Kish begot Saul; and Saul begot Jonathan, and Malchi-shua, and Abinadab, and Eshbaal.

— 1 Chronicles 8:33 and 1 Chronicles 9:39, Jewish Publication Society, 1917

== Archaeology ==
In 2012, according to the Israel Antiquities Authority, archaeologists had discovered a 3,000-year-old inscription on a reconstructed large ceramic jar found in Khirbet Qeiyafa, containing the name "Eshbaal ben Beda". Though this Eshbaal is a different person than the Eshbaal/Ish-Bosheth of the Bible, it was the first time the name was discovered in an ancient inscription. It is one of only four Hebrew inscriptions ever discovered dating to the 10th century BC.

== Speculations ==
David Rohl identifies Ish-Bosheth or Ishbaal with Mutbaal as the names have the same meaning and, both, Ishbosheth son of Saul as well as Mutbaal son of Labaya ruled from an ancient city in Transjordan. But the chronology that would make this identification feasible is not accepted by the majority of scholars, and two people may have the same name and still belong to different time periods.

== Bibliography ==
- Bright, John (2000). A History of Israel. Westminster John Knox Press. ISBN 978-0-664-22068-6.
- Garfinkel, Yosef; Ganor, Saar; Hasel, Michael G. (2018). In the Footsteps of King David: Revelations from an Ancient Biblical City. Thames & Hudson. ISBN 9780500774281.
- Margalith, Othniel (1994). The Sea Peoples in the Bible. Otto Harrassowitz Verlag. ISBN 978-3-447-03516-3.

Ish-bosheth House of Saul Cadet branch of the Tribe of Benjamin
Regnal titles
Preceded by Saul	King of Israel	Succeeded by David
