= David's Mighty Warriors =

hag-Gibborim הַגִּבֹּרִ֛ים
- Founded: 1010 BCE
- Disbanded: 970 BCE
- Country: United Monarchy
- Allegiance: David
- Type: Special operations force, shock troops
- Role: Special operations, Infantry
- Size: 37
- Nickname: David’s Mighty Warriors

Commanders
- Founder & Commander: David

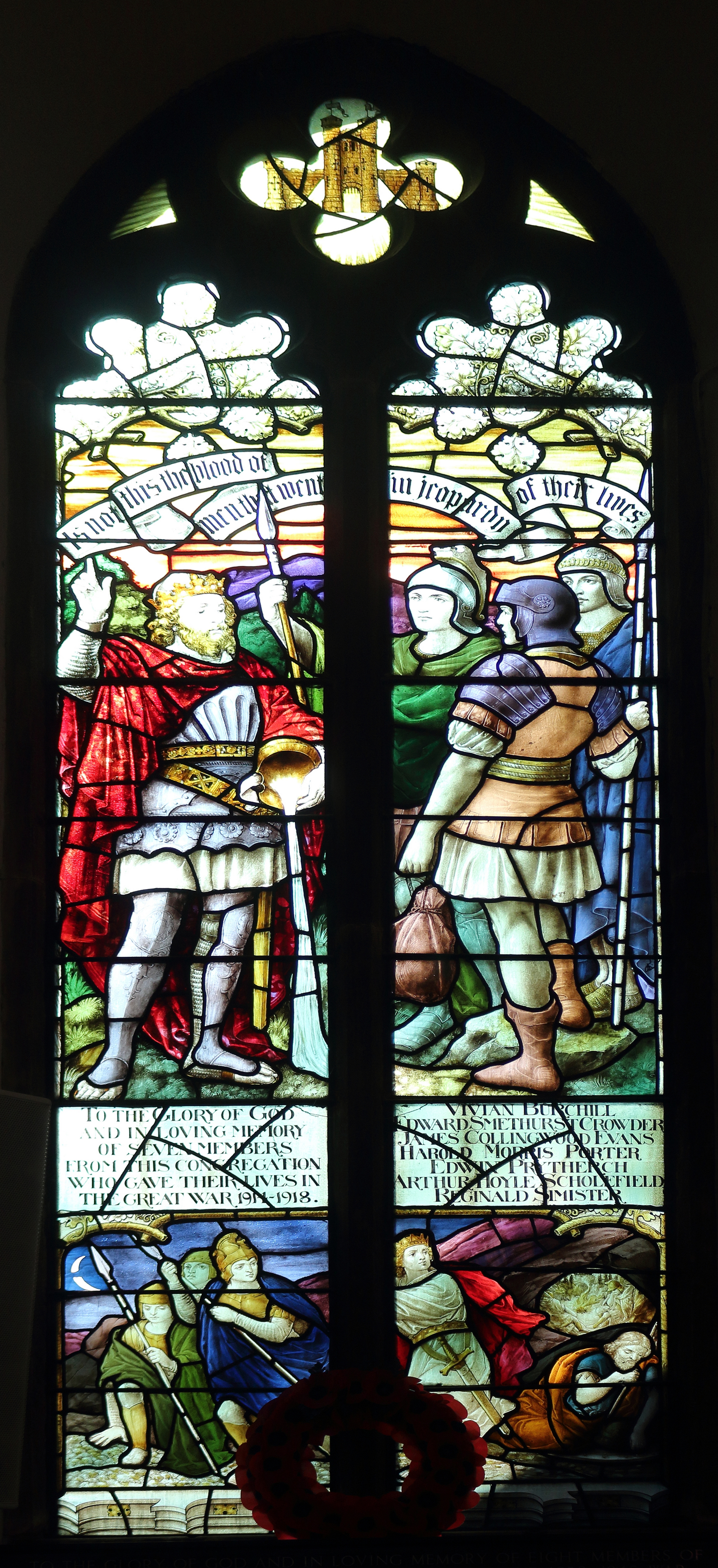
World War I memorial in West Kirby Methodist church; it depicts David and his three mighty men, and the quote "Is not this the blood of men who went in jeopardy of their lives?" (2 Samuel 23:17)

David's Mighty Warriors (also known as David's Mighty Men or the Gibborim; Hebrew: הַגִּבֹּרִ֛ים, romanized: hagGībbōrīm, lit. 'the Mighty') are a group of 37 men in the Hebrew Bible who fought with King David and are identified in 2 Samuel 23:8–38, part of the "supplementary information" added to the Second Book of Samuel in its final four chapters. The International Standard Version calls them "David's special forces".

A similar list is given in 1 Chronicles 11:10–47 but with several variations and sixteen more names.

The text divides them into "the Three", of which there are three, and "the Thirty", of which there are more than thirty. The text explicitly states that there are 37 individuals in all, but it is unclear whether this refers to The Thirty, which may or may not contain The Three, or the combined total of both groups. The text refers to The Three and The Thirty as though they were both important entities, and not just an arbitrary list of three or 30-plus significant men.

== Complete list ==
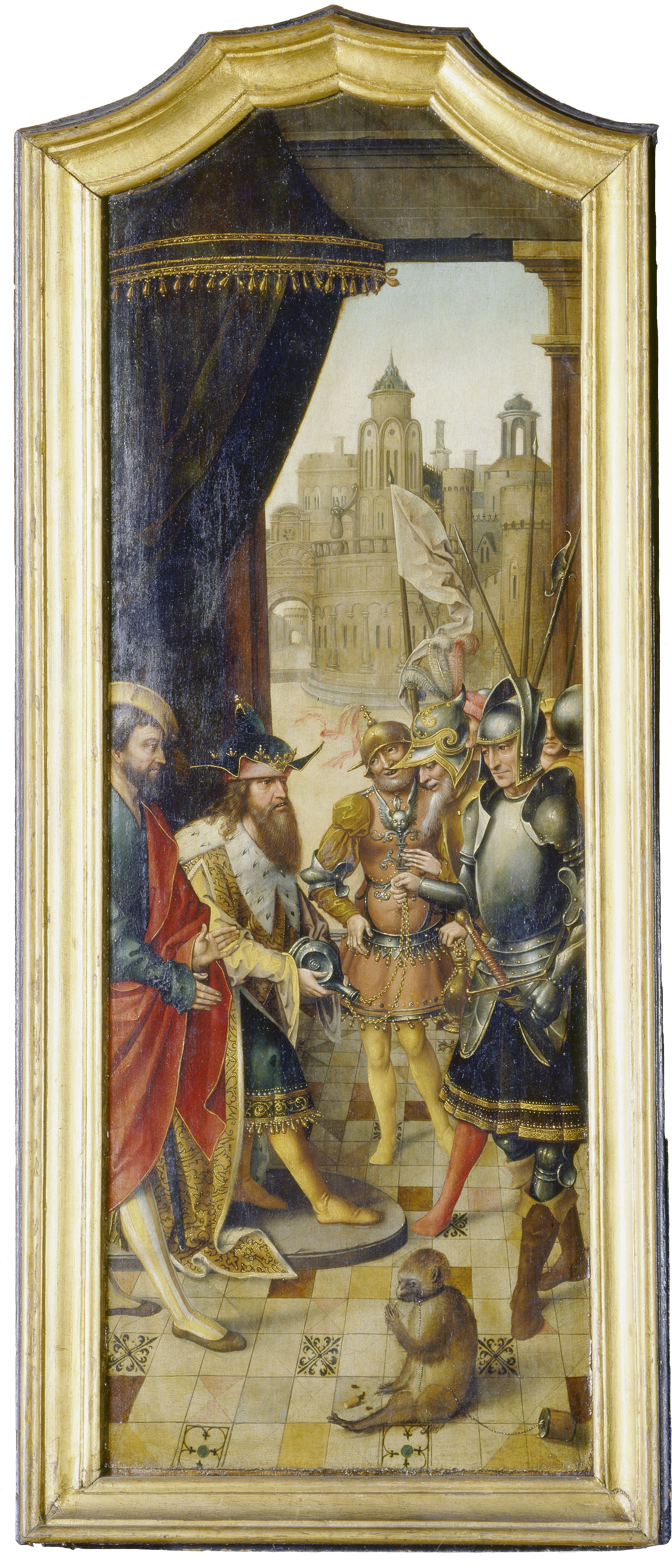
King David receiving the cistern water of Bethlehem, by the Master of the Von Groote Adoration

2 Samuel 23:8–39	1 Chronicles 11:10–47
Josheb-basshebeth (Note: The Hebrew Masoretic Text erroneously reads "Josheb-Basshebeth." A later anti-polytheistic scribe edited the book of Samuel and removed all instances of בַעַל, the god "Baal," in proper names with בֹ֖שֶׁת "shame" (cf. 2 Sam 11:21 and Judg 7:1). This explains why some Septuagint manuscripts read "Ishbosheth". After this edit, the text suffered further corruption into "Josheb-Basshebeth." The Masoretic Text and some Septuagint manuscripts seem to say Josheb-Basshebeth was also called "Adino the Eznite." Such reading was a corruption of the text, much as "Josheb-Basshebeth." BHS purports with 2 medieval manuscripts, various Septuagint manuscripts, 2 Sam 23:18 and 1 Chron 11:11 the reading "and he raised his spear" instead, which removes the problems of awkward syntax and having four men in the three.) the Tahkemonite	Jashobeam the Hakmonite
Eleazar ben Dodai (Note: Written as Dodi/Dodoi/Dodai) the Ahohite	Eleazar ben Dodo (Note: Some manuscripts have "Dodai".) the Ahohite
Shammah ben Agee the Hararite	–
Abishai ahi Joab ben Zeruiah	Abshai ahi Joab
Benaiah ben Jehoiada	Benaiah ben Jehoiada
Asahel ahi Joab	Asahel ahi Joab
Elhanan ben Dodo of Bethlehem	Elhanan ben Dodo of Bethlehem
Shammah the Harodite (Note: It is not clear whether this is the same as "Shammah ben Agee the Hararite", one of the Three.)	Shammoth the Harorite
Elika the Harodite	—
Helez the Paltite	Helez the Pelonite
Ira ben Ikkesh of Tekoa	Ira ben Ikkesh of Tekoa
Abiezer of Anathoth	Abiezer of Anathoth
Mebunnai (Note: Some Septuagint manuscripts have "Sibbekai".) the Hushathite	Sibbekai the Hushathite
Zalmon the Ahohite	Ilai the Ahohite
Maharai the Netophathite	Maharai the Netophathite
Heleb (Note: Some Hebrew manuscripts and the Vulgate have "Heled") ben Baanah the Netophathite	Heled ben Baanah the Netophathite
Ittai ben Ribai of Gibeah of Benjamin	Ithai ben Ribai of Gibeah of Benjamin
Benaiah, a Pirathonite (Note: It is not clear whether this is the same as "Benaiah ben Jehoiada".)	Benaiah the Pirathonite
Hiddai (Note: Some Septuagint manuscripts have "Hurai") of the Ravines of Gaash	Hurai of the Ravines of Gaash
Abi-Albon the Arbathite	Abiel the Arbathite
Azmaveth the Barhumite	Azmaveth the Baharumite
Eliahba the Shaalbonite	Eliahba the Shaalbonite
Jonathan, of the sons of Jashen	–
–	the sons of Hashem the Gizonite
Shammah the Hararite (Note: Presumably the same as "Shammah ben Agee the Hararite", one of the Three.)	Jonathan ben Shagee (Note: Apparently a contraction or error for "Shammah ben Agee".) the Hararite
Ahiam ben Sharar (Note: Some Septuagint manuscripts have "Sakar".) the Ararite	Ahiam ben Sakar the Hararite
Eliphelet ben Ahasbai son of the Maakathite	Eliphal ben Ur
Eliam ben Ahithophel the Gilonite	—
—	Hepher the Mekerathite
—	Ahijah the Pelonite
Hezrai (Note: Written as Hezraw/Hezro) the Carmelite	Hezro the Carmelite
Paarai the Arbite	Naarai ben Ezbai
Igal ben Nathan of Zobah	Joel ahi Nathan
Bani the Gadite (Note: Some manuscripts instead read "the son(s) of Haggadi". Some Septuagint manuscripts have "Hagri".)	Mibhar ben Hagri
Zelek the Ammonite	Zelek the Ammonite
Naharai the Beerothite	Naharai the Berothite
Ira the Ithrite	Ira the Ithrite
Gareb the Ithrite	Gareb the Ithrite
Uriah the Hittite	Uriah the Hittite
—	Zabad ben Ahlai
—	Adina ben Shiza the Reubenite
—	Hanan ben Maacah
—	Joshaphat the Mithnite
—	Uzzia the Ashterathite
—	Shama (ben Hotham the Aroerite)
—	Jeiel (Note: Written as Yeuel) ben Hotham the Aroerite
—	Jediael ben Shimri
—	Joha (ben Shimri) the Tizite
—	Eliel (ben Elnaam) the Mahavite
—	Jeribai (ben Elnaam)
—	Joshaviah ben Elnaam
—	Ithmah the Moabite
—	Eliel (Note: Apparently distinct from "Eliel the Mahavite".)
—	Obed
—	Jaasiel the Mezobaite

== The Three ==
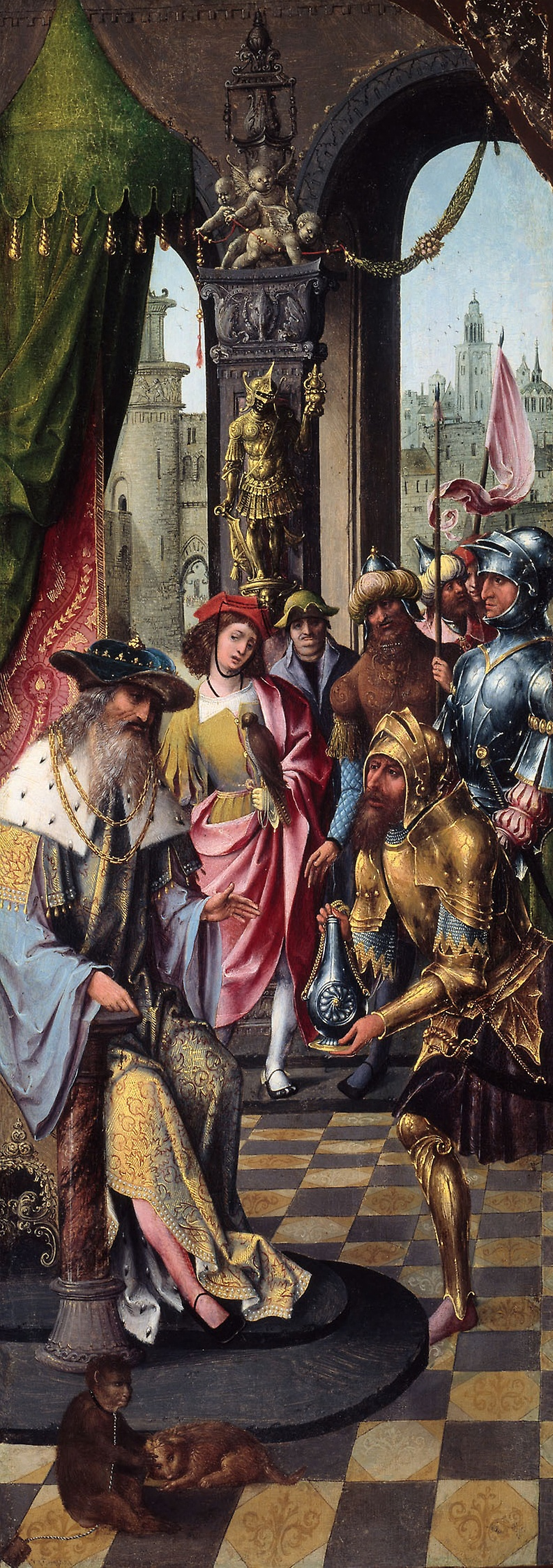
David receiving the cistern water of Bethlehem, by the Master of the Antwerp Adoration

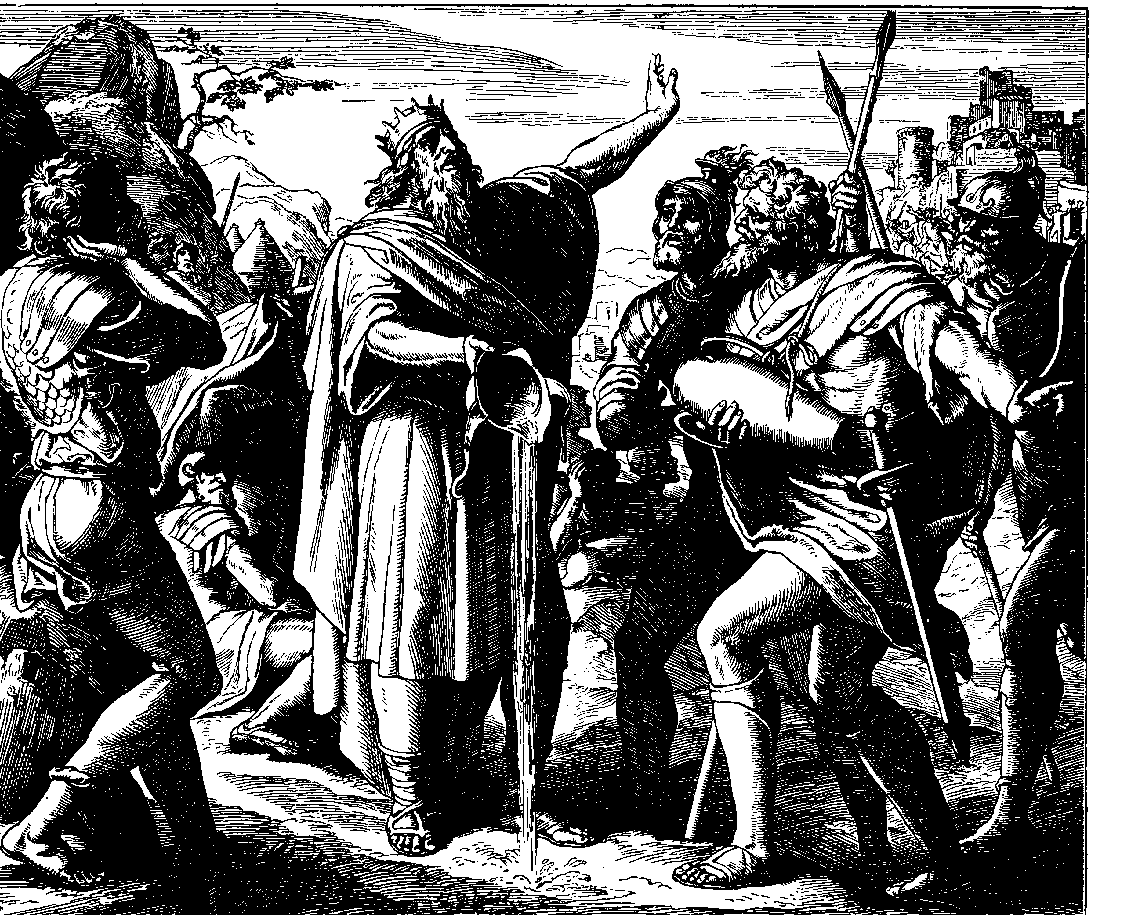
Woodcut of David pouring out the water, by Julius Schnorr von Carolsfeld, 1860.

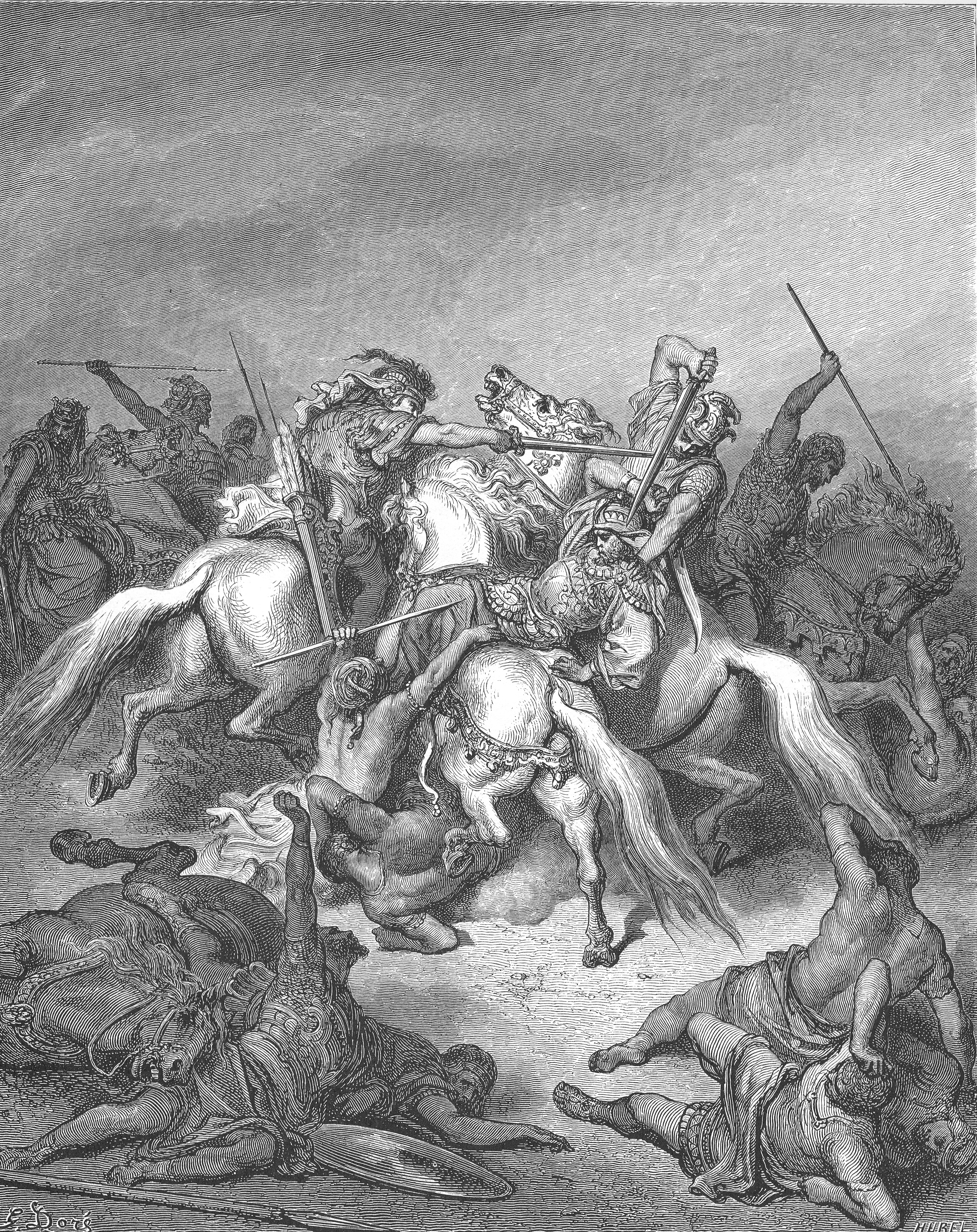
Abishai saving David's life from the Philistine giant Ishbi-benob, engraving by Gustave Doré

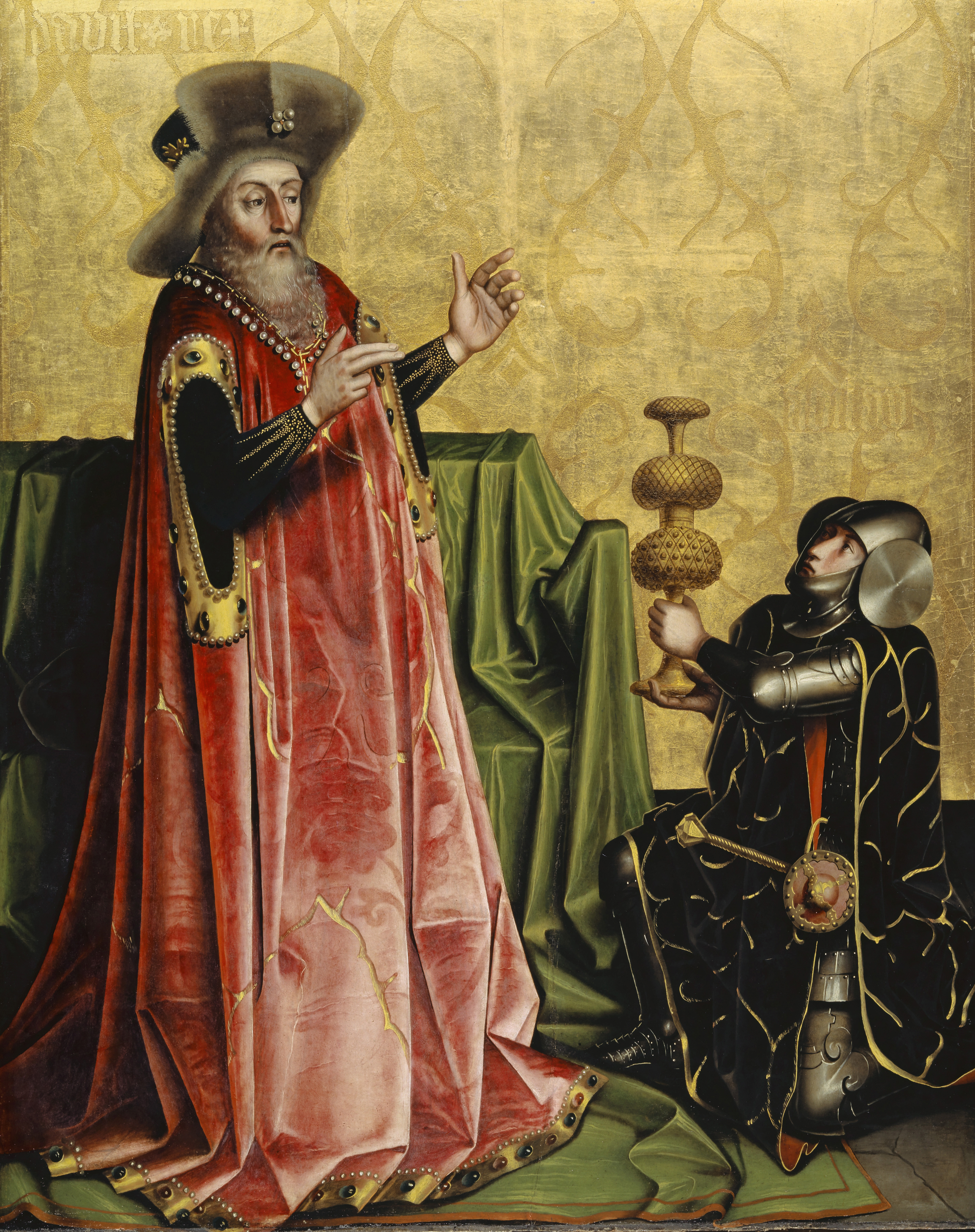
Abishai before David, by Konrad Witz

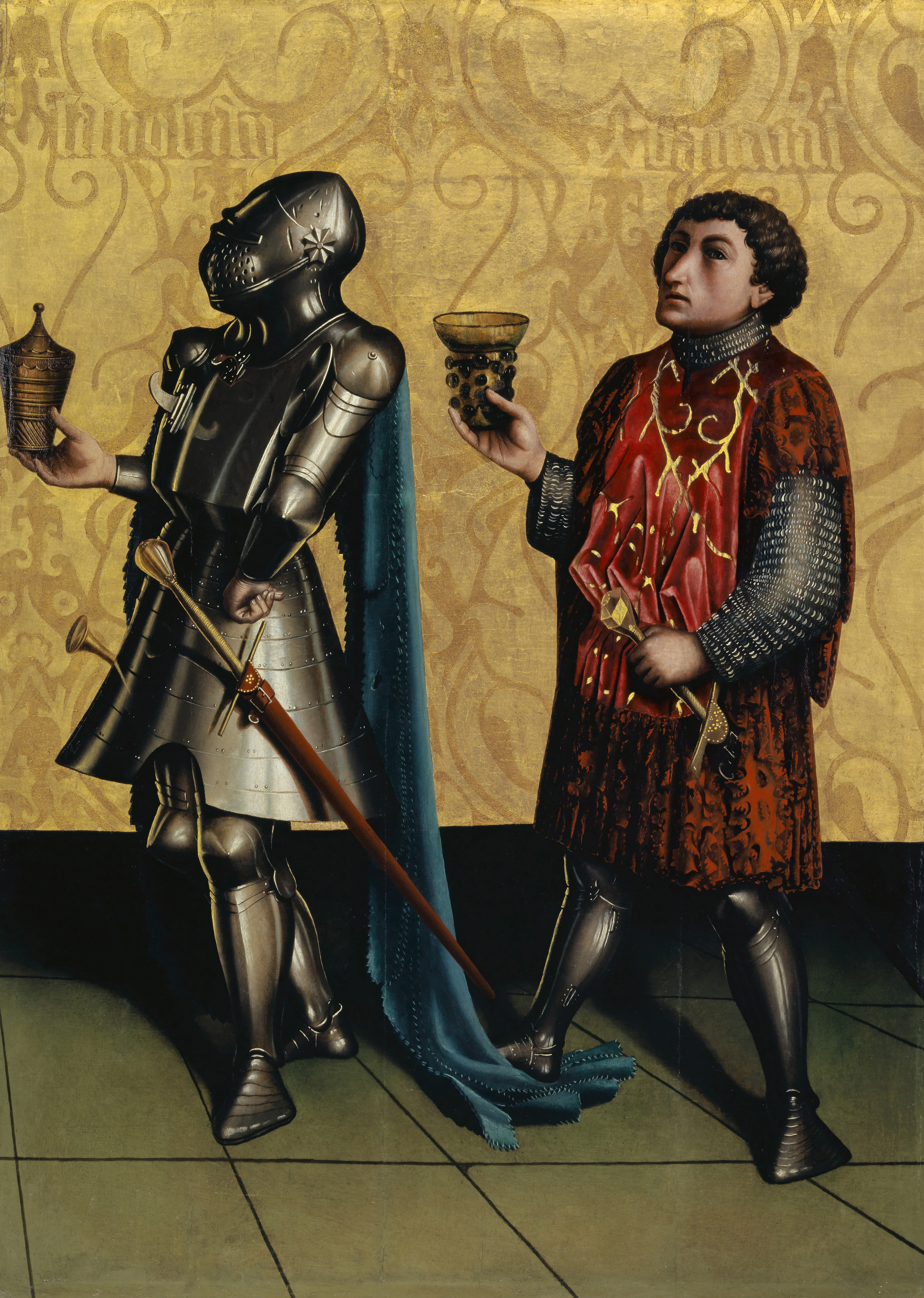
Sibbecai and Benaiah, by Konrad Witz

The Three are Ishbaal the Tahkemonite, Eleazar son of Dodo the Ahohite, and Shammah son of Agee the Hararite.

The Book of Chronicles also mentions the Three. According to one reading, the first of these three is named as Jashobeam instead. However, the Septuagint version of the same passage presents a name that scholars regard as clearly being a transliteration from Isbosheth— the euphemism employed in some parts of the Bible for the name Ishbaal. Hence, the first member of The Three was possibly Ishbaal, Saul's son and heir; the text had become corrupted either deliberately (e.g. due to an editor who sought to downplay Ishbaal's heroism) or accidentally. According to other translations following the Masoretic text more closely, Jashobeam is the head of "thirty" or "chief officers" but not even part of the Three. Ishbaal is described as being the leader and is said to have killed 800 men in a single encounter. Ishbaal is also described as a Tahkemonite, which is probably a corruption of Hacmonite, the latter being how he is described by the Book of Chronicles.

Eleazar is described as standing his ground against the Philistines at Pas Dammim when the rest of the Hebrews ran away and as successfully defeating them. Similarly, Shammah is described as having stood his ground when the Philistines attacked a "field of ripe lentils" despite the rest of his associates dispersing and as having defeated the attackers.

== The Thirty ==
The Thirty are not heavily described by the text, merely listed. There are several differences between the ancient manuscripts of the list, whether they are of the Masoretic Text or the Septuagint. Textual scholars generally consider the Septuagint more reliable than the Masoretic Text regarding this list, particularly since the Masoretic Text of Chronicles matches the Septuagint version of the Books of Samuel more closely than the Masoretic version. In addition, there are a few places where it is uncertain whether one person is referred to or if it is two people. The individuals that are clearly identified are:

- Elhanan son of Dodo from Bethlehem
- Shammah from Arad
- Helez from Beth-Palet
- Ira son of Ikkesh from Tuqu'
- Abiezer from Anathoth
- a man from Hushah that was named either Mebunnai (according to the Masoretic text) or was named Sibbecai (according to the Septuagint and Chronicles)
- Ilai the Ahohite, descended from Ahoah
- Maharai from Netophah
- Heleb son of Baanah from Netophah
- Ithai son of Ribai from Gibeah
- Benaiah from Pirathon
- a man from the ravines of Gaash that was named Hiddai (according to the masoretic text) or was named Hurai (according to the Septuagint and Chronicles)
- Abi-Albon from Beth-Arabah
- Azmaveth from Bahurim
- Eliahba from Shaalbim
- the (unnamed) sons of a man that was either named Hashem and was from Gizon (according to the Septuagint and Chronicles) or was named 16. Jashen (according to the masoretic text)
- Ahiam from Arad, whose father was either named Sharar (according to the masoretic text) or was named Sacar (according to the Septuagint and Chronicles)
- Eliphelet from Maacah, whose father was either named Ahasbai (according to the Books of Samuel) or Ur (according to Chronicles)
- Eliam son of Ahithophel from Giloh
- Hezro from Carmel
- Zelek from Ammon
- Ira from Jattir
- Gareb from Jattir
- Uriah the Hittite.

In addition to these, there are a few cases where an individual is named, and is then followed by a description that is unclear as to whether it refers to them, or whether it refers to an additional unnamed person:

- Naharai from Beeroth, (and/who is) the armour-bearer of Joab
- Igal son of Nathan from Zobah, (and/who is) the son of a man named Hagri (according to the masoretic text and Chronicles) or Haggadi (according to the Septuagint).

For the remaining names of the list, there are some significant textual issues, the most minor of which being that the Books of Samuel lists Paarai the Arbite but the Book of Chronicles lists Naarai son of Exbai instead. The list in Samuel is generally presented in pairs, where each member of a pair comes from a similar location to the other member, but this pattern is broken by Shammah (from Arad), Elika (from Arad), and Helez (from Beth-Palet), who make a trio; in Chronicles, however, Elika isn't even listed. The final name(s) on the list itself is/are given by the Masoretic Text as Jonathan son of Shammah from Arad, but the septuagint has Jonathan, [and] Shammah from Arad; the septuagint implies that the passage was understood to refer to a Jonathan significant enough to need no further qualification, thus probably referring to the Jonathan that elsewhere is described as a son of Saul—which Jonathan being a son of Shammah would contradict.

According to textual scholars Jonathan is distinctly associated by other parts of the Books of Samuel with the Hebrews, while Saul is distinctly associated with the Israelites (who the text consistently treats as a distinct group from the Hebrews), and his being Saul's son is considered by some textual scholars as more ethnological than necessarily literal.

It is more likely that this was Jonathan the son of Shemea, David’s brother mentioned in 1 Chronicles 20:7 as having defeated a Philistine giant.

As the list is proceeded with ...David put him in command of his bodyguard. Asahel, brother of Joab. Among the thirty were..... , an Asahel the brother of Joab is sometimes considered to be part of the list, having become misplaced rather than the start of a lost passage.

== Three of The Thirty ==
The text also contains a narrative passage about "three of The Thirty". It is unclear from the text whether this refers to The Three, hence implying that The Three were a special group within The Thirty, or whether it refers to another group of three individuals. The narrative, which recounts a single exploit, ends with "such were the exploits of the three mighty men", and textual scholars believe that the narrative may be an extract from a larger group of tales concerning these three. The flowing narrative differs in style from the more abrupt introductions to individual members of The Three and The Thirty that surround it, and textual scholars believe that it may originally have been from a different document.

In the narrative, three of the thirty visit David when he is located at the cave of Adullam. While there, David expresses a heartfelt desire for water from a well near Bethlehem, which the narrative states was occupied by Philistines. The three of the thirty therefore forcefully break past the Philistines, and draw water from the well, which they take back to David. David refuses to drink the water, instead pouring it out "before Yahweh", arguing that it was the blood of the men who had risked their lives. Biblical scholars argue that the description of David pouring out the water is a reference to David offering the water to Yahweh as a libation.

== Abishai ==
An additional account, continuing on from the description of The Three, which was interrupted by the narrative concerning David's thirst, describes Abishai, the brother of Joab. According to the text, he killed 300 men with a spear, and so became famous among The Thirty, though not as famous and respected as The Three. The text states that despite the fame and respect he was not included among The Three, suggesting that being a part of The Three is not just a group of famous people, but something which an individual could in some way gain membership, with criteria that involved more than fame and honour.

According to most manuscripts of the masoretic text, Abishai became the commander of The Three, but according to the Syriac Peshitta, and a few masoretic text manuscripts, Abishai instead became the commander of The Thirty. The text explicitly states that Abishai became the commander of The Three despite not being among them, but it is unclear whether this is directly because he was their commander (as with the masoretic text), or whether he was commander of The Thirty (as with the Septuagint) and The Three were a subgroup of The Thirty (as possibly implied by the narrative about "three of The Thirty").

== Benaiah ==
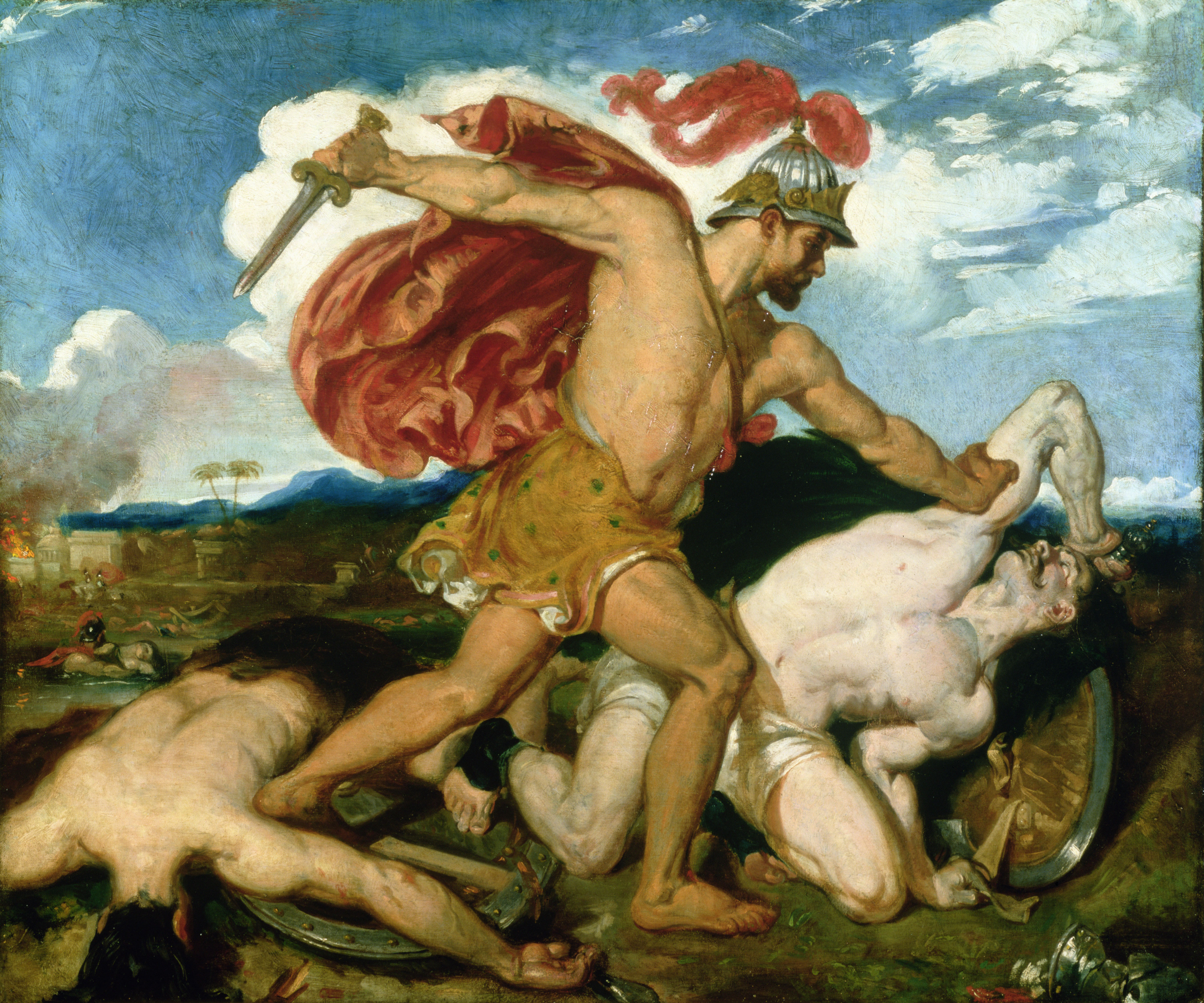
Benaiah, by William Etty

Benaiah is singled out by the text for being a particularly great warrior, as famous as The Three, and significantly more respected than any of The Thirty, for which reason he was put in charge of the royal bodyguard. As with Abishai, the text emphasizes that despite these qualities, Benaiah was not a member of The Three. The text gives a list of Benaiah's "great exploits", suggesting that these are what brought him fame and honor; compared with the feats ascribed by the text to Abishai, and to the members of The Three, Benaiah's feats are somewhat minor:

- Killing two of Moab's best warriors
- Killing a lion in a pit on a snowy day
- Attacking a 7 1/2-foot tall Egyptian with a club, stealing the spear that the Egyptian was using, and killing the Egyptian with it.

== See also ==
- Cherethites and Pelethites
- English translations of the Bible
- Septuagint
- Masoretic Text
- Syriac Peshitta
