= Eleazar (son of Dodai) =

Eleazar (Hebrew: אֶלְעָזָר, Eləʻāzār; fl. 10th or 9th century) was one of the Three Mighty Warriors and an officer under David, according to 2 Samuel and 1 Chronicles. His father was Dodai or Dodo, and he was a Benjamite through his ancestor Ahoah.

While fighting the Philistines at Ephes Dammim alongside Jashobeam and Shammah, the other two warriors of the Three, Eleazar fought so long and hard his hand clamped onto his sword.

Eleazar, as part of the Three, broke through Philistine lines in Bethlehem to get a drink for David from a well near the gate while they were encamped in the Cave of Adullam, but David poured the water out as a drink offering to God, saying, "Is it not the blood of men who went at the risk of their lives?"
