= Jashobeam =

Hebrew man of the 9th century BCE

Jashobeam, (Note: /ˌdʒæʃəˈbiːəm/ JASH-ə-BEE-əm; Hebrew: יָשָׁבְעָם, romanized: Yāšoḇəʻām.) Jesbaam or Jesbaham (Note: From the Latinization Iēsbaam.) (fl. 10th or 9th century BC), also called Josheb-Basshebeth (Note: /ˈdʒoʊʃɛb ˈbæʃɪbɛθ/ JOH-sheb BASH-ib-eth; Hebrew: יֹשֵׁב בַּשֶּׁבֶת, romanized: Yōšēḇ Baššeḇeṯ; in some Septuagint manuscripts Ish-Bosheth.) and possibly Adino the Eznite, (Note: /əˈdaɪnoʊ/ ə-DY-noh; Hebrew: עֲדִינֹו, romanized: ʻAdīnō.) was chief of the Three Mighty Warriors, and an officer appointed under King David in charge of the first division of 24,000 men, on duty for the first month of the year, according to the list given in 1 Chronicles 27. Jashobeam was a Benjamite from Hakmon (he is variously called a "Hakmonite" or "Tahkemonite"). His father was Zabdiel, a descendant of Korah. He was also a descendant of Pharez of the Tribe of Judah.

== Biblical narrative ==
Jashobeam was renowned in the Kingdom of Israel for having singlehandedly killed several hundred troops with his spear (800 according to Samuel, 300 according to Chronicles). However, in 2 Samuel 23:8–17, in a passage describing the Three (Jashobeam, Eleazar, and Shammah), the Hebrew and most Septuagint manuscripts read, "Josheb-Basshebeth, a Tahkemonite, was chief of the Three; it was Adino the Eznite[,] who killed eight hundred men in one encounter" (2 Samuel 23:8b). It is unclear textually whether "Adino the Eznite" is meant to refer to someone else apart from the Three (in which case it is out of place in the passage), whether it is another name for Jashobeam, or whether it is a textual corruption.

During a battle with the Philistines at Ephes Dammim, Jashobeam, along with Eleazar and Shammah, taunted the Philistines. The Israelite army retreated in fear, but the Three defeated the Philistine army themselves in a barley field.

While David was encamped in the Cave of Adullam on a campaign against the Philistines, who were garrisoned in Bethlehem, Jashobeam, as part of the Three, broke the Philistine lines to reach a well near Bethlehem's gate to get David a drink. However, David poured the water out as a drink offering to God, saying, "Is it not the blood of men who went at the risk of their lives?"

== See also ==
- David's Mighty Warriors
- Eleazar the Ahohite
- Shammah the Hararite
