= Elhanan =

Elhanan is a masculine given name and a surname. Notable people with the name include:

== Given name ==
- The biblical Elhanan, son of Dodo, mentioned in 2 Samuel 23:24 and 1 Chronicles 11:26, one of King David's elite fighters known as The Thirty
- The biblical Elhanan, son of Jaare-oregim, mentioned in 2 Samuel 21:19 and 1 Chronicles 20:5
- Elhanan Bicknell (1788–1861), British businessman, shipowner and art collector
- Elhanan Glazer (born 1947), Israeli politician
- Elhanan Helpman (born 1946), Israeli economist
- Elhanan ben Isaac of Dampierre (died 1184), French rabbi
- Elhanan Kalmanson (died 2023), part of Elhanan Team, two brothers and their nephew, who saved lives in the Palestinian October 7 attacks
- Elhanan Leib Lewinsky (1857–1910), Hebrew-language writer and Zionist leader, often credited with writing the first work of science fiction in Hebrew
- Elhanan Miller (born 1981), Israeli teacher, writer and rabbi
- Elhanan Rosenstein (1796–1869), German rabbi and writer
- Elhanan J. Searle (1835–1906), American judge, associate justice of the Arkansas Supreme Court
- Elhanan Tannenbaum (1946–2024), Israeli businessman captured and exchanged by Hezbollah
- Elhanan Winchester (1751–1797), American theologian

== Surname ==
- Rami Elhanan (born c.1950), Israeli peace activist

== See also ==
- Chushiel or Ḥushiel ben Elḥanan, president of the beth midrash at Kairouan toward the end of the 10th century
- Shemariah ben Elhanan, head of the yeshivah of Cairo around the end of the 10th century
