= Gaash =

Gaash or Ga'ash may refer to:

- Ga'ash, a kibbutz in Israel
- Mount Gaash, a hill in ancient Israel
