= 1 Chronicles 20 =

First Book of Chronicles, chapter 20

- ← chapter 19 chapter 21 →
- The complete Hebrew text of the Books of Chronicles (1 and 2 Chronicles) in the Leningrad Codex (1008 CE).
- Book: Books of Chronicles
- Category: Ketuvim
- Christian Bible part: Old Testament
- Order in the Christian part: 13

1 Chronicles 20 is the twentieth chapter of the Books of Chronicles in the Hebrew Bible or the First Book of Chronicles in the Old Testament of the Christian Bible. The book is compiled from older sources by an unknown person or group, designated by modern scholars as "the Chronicler", and had the final shape established in late fifth or fourth century BCE. This chapter records the account of David's wars against the neighboring nations, especially the Ammonites and the Philistines. The whole chapter belongs to the section focusing on the kingship of David (1 Chronicles 9:35 to 29:30).

== Text ==
This chapter was originally written in the Hebrew language. It is divided into 8 verses.

=== Textual witnesses ===
Some early manuscripts containing the text of this chapter in Hebrew are of the Masoretic Text tradition, which includes the Aleppo Codex (10th century), and Codex Leningradensis (1008).

Extant manuscripts of a Koine Greek translation known as the Septuagint, made in the last few centuries BCE, include Codex Vaticanus (B; $\mathfrak{G}$^{B}; 4th century), Codex Alexandrinus (A; $\mathfrak{G}$^{A}; 5th century) and Codex Marchalianus (Q; $\mathfrak{G}$^{Q}; 6th century). (Note: The extant Codex Sinaiticus only contains 1 Chronicles 9:27–19:17.)

=== Old Testament references ===
- 1 Chronicles 20:1–3: 2 Samuel 12:26–31
- 1 Chronicles 20:4–8:2 Samuel 21:15–22.

== The capture of Rabbah (20:1–3) ==
The passage parallels 2 Samuel 11:1; 12:26a, 30–31, leaving out the episodes involving David, Bathsheba and Uriah the Hittite as well as 2 Samuel 12:27–29, which would be between verse 1 and 2.

=== Verse 2 ===
And David took the crown of their king from off his head, and found it to weigh a talent of gold, and there were precious stones in it; and it was set upon David's head: and he brought also exceeding much spoil out of the city.

- "The crown of their king": from Hebrew: את־עטרת־מלכם ’eṯ-‘ă-ṭe-reṯ-mal-kām; rendered "the crown of Milkom" in NRSV, following Septuagint and Vulgate, referring to "Milkom", 'the national deity of the Ammonites' (1 Kings 11:5, 7, 33; 2 Kings 23:13).
- "Talent": a weight measurement about 34 kilograms (75 lb)
- "Spoil": or "plunder"

== Battles against the Philistines (20:4–8) ==
This passage contains the accounts of three battles against the Philistines involving David's mighty warriors out of the four reported in 2 Samuel 21:15–22. The episode where Abishai, the son of Zeruiah, saved David from being killed by Ishbi-benob is not included in the Chronicles, probably to avoid the unpleasant impression of a Philistine endangering David, so the number "four" appearing in 2 Samuel 21:22 is also removed in the corresponding verse 8. The Chronicles also harmonizes the confusing claims in the books of Samuel (1 Samuel 17:4, 50 and 2 Samuel 21:19) into a clearer statement in verse 5.

=== Verse 5 ===
King James Version

And there was war again with the Philistines; and Elhanan the son of Jair slew Lahmi the brother of Goliath the Gittite, whose spear staff was like a weaver's beam.

New English Translation

There was another battle with the Philistines in which Elhanan son of Jair the Bethlehemite killed the brother of Goliath the Gittite, whose spear had a shaft as big as the crossbeam of a weaver’s loom.

The Hebrew text comparison with the corresponding verse 2 Samuel 21:19 demonstrates that the Chronicles (composed after the Babylonian exile) provides clarification to the older text written before the exile, as can be seen here (Hebrew text is read from right to left):

2 Samuel 21:19: ויך אלחנן בן־יערי ארגים בית הלחמי את גלית
transliteration: wa·yaḵ ’el·ḥā·nān ben-ya‘·rê ’ō·rə·ḡîm bêṯ ha·laḥ·mî, ’êṯ gā·lə·yāṯ
English: "and killed Elhanan ben Jaare-Oregim bet-ha-Lahmi, (brother) of Goliath"

1 Chronicles 20:5: ויך אלחנן בן־יעיר את־לחמי אחי גלית
transliteration: wa·yaḵ ’el·ḥā·nān ben-yā·‘îr ’eṯ-laḥ·mî, ’ă·ḥî gā·lə·yāṯ
English: "and killed Elhanan ben Jair Lahmi, brother of Goliath"

The relation of Lahmi to Goliath in the older text (Samuel) is only given using the word "’êṯ" which can be rendered as "together with; related to", whereas in the newer version (Chronicles), it is given using the word "’ă·ḥî" meaning "brother". Therefore it is clear in the Chronicles that David killed Goliath (as recorded in 1 Samuel 17), then Elhanan killed the brother of Goliath.

It is also noted that the word "’ōregîm" (meaning "weaver") is written only once in this verse, but it is found twice in 2 Samuel, the first of which is attached to the proper name "Jaare" to be "Jaare-oregim", which may create confusion with the second use of the word to describe the weapon of the Philistine.

=== Verse 8 ===
These were born to the giant in Gath, and they fell by the hand of David and by the hand of his servants.

- "The giant": from Hebrew: הרפא hā-rā-p̄ā, "Rapha" (NET Bible), whereas in 2 Samuel 21:22 it is written as הרפה hā-rā-p̄āh, "Raphah." By slightly changing a consonant, the Chronicler presents "Rapha's descendants" as "Rephaites", who are legendary "giants" mentioned in Deuteronomy 2:11, 20-21; 3:11-13. This elevates the significance of the mentioned battles, although it does not appear as such in the English translation.

== See also ==
- David's Mighty Warriors
- House of David
- Jerusalem
- Zeruiah
- Related Bible parts: 1 Samuel 17, 2 Samuel 10, 2 Samuel 12, 2 Samuel 21, 1 Chronicles 19

== Sources ==
- Ackroyd, Peter R (1993). "Chronicles, Books of". In Metzger, Bruce M; Coogan, Michael D (eds.). The Oxford Companion to the Bible. Oxford University Press. pp. 113–116. ISBN 978-0195046458.
- Bennett, William (2018). The Expositor's Bible: The Books of Chronicles. Litres. ISBN 978-5040825196.
- Coogan, Michael David (2007). Coogan, Michael David; Brettler, Marc Zvi; Newsom, Carol Ann; Perkins, Pheme (eds.). The New Oxford Annotated Bible with the Apocryphal/Deuterocanonical Books: New Revised Standard Version, Issue 48 (Augmented 3rd ed.). Oxford University Press. ISBN 9780195288810.
- Endres, John C. (2012). First and Second Chronicles. Liturgical Press. ISBN 9780814628447.
- Hill, Andrew E. (2003). First and Second Chronicles. Zondervan. ISBN 9780310206101.
- Mabie, Frederick (2017). "I. The Chronicler's Genealogical Survey of All Israel". In Longman III, Tremper; Garland, David E (eds.). 1 and 2 Chronicles. The Expositor's Bible Commentary. Zondervan. pp. 267–308. ISBN 978-0310531814.
- Mathys, H. P. (2007). "14. 1 and 2 Chronicles". In Barton, John; Muddiman, John (eds.). The Oxford Bible Commentary (first (paperback) ed.). Oxford University Press. pp. 267–308. ISBN 978-0199277186.
- Tuell, Steven S. (2012). First and Second Chronicles. Westminster John Knox Press. ISBN 978-0664238650.
- Würthwein, Ernst (1995). The Text of the Old Testament. Translated by Rhodes, Erroll F. Grand Rapids, MI: William B. Eerdmans. ISBN 0-8028-0788-7.
