= Elhanan, son of Jaare-oregim =

Biblical figure, killer of Goliath according to 2 Samuel 21:19

Elhanan, son of Jaare-Oregim the Bethlehemite (Hebrew: אֶלְחָנָן בֶּן־יַעְרֵי אֹרְגִים בֵּית הַלַּחְמִי, romanized: ʾElḥānān ben-Yaʿrē ʾOrəgīm Bēṯ halLaḥmī) appears in 2 Samuel 21:19, where he is credited with killing Goliath: "There was another battle with the Philistines at Gob, and Elhanan son of Jaare-oregim the Bethlehemite killed Goliath the Gittite, the shaft of whose spear was like a weaver's beam." In 1 Chronicles 20:5, he is called Elhanan, son of Jair (אֶלְחָנָן בֶּן־יָעִיר ʾElḥānān ben-Yāʿīr), indicating that Jaare-oregim is a garbled corruption of the name Jair and the word for "beam" used in the verse (ʾorəgim). The passage in 2 Samuel 21:19 poses difficulties when compared with the story of David and Goliath in 1 Samuel 17, leading scholars to conclude "that the attribution of Goliath's slaying to David may not be original," but rather "an elaboration and reworking of" an earlier Elhanan story, "attributing the victory to the better-known David."

== Resolution with the story of David and Goliath ==
Crediting Goliath's death to David instead of Elhanan results in inconsistency. Some harmonistic solutions have been offered by later writers and translators within both Jewish and Christian traditions:

- The 4th century BCE Books of Chronicles resolved it by describing how "Elhanan the son of Jair killed Lahmi the brother of Goliath the Gittite" (1 Chronicles 20:5). The name Lahmi is thought by biblical source critics to be a construction from the last portion of the word "Bethlehemite".
- The Targum Jonathan, a translation of the Hebrew scriptures into Aramaic, identified Elhanan with David as both were from Bethlehem (Targum Jonathan 2 Samuel 21:19), although this creates yet another problem in that Elhanan is listed as one of David's followers and the killings occur in different places.
- The King James Version harmonized 2 Samuel 21:19 with 1 Chronicles 20:5 by supplying the words the brother of (in smaller text, replaced in later printings with italic text) to make it read as if Elhanan had slain Goliath's brother: "And there was again a battle in Gob with the Philistines, where Elhanan the son of Jaare–oregim, a Bethlehemite, slew the brother of Goliath the Gittite, the staff of whose spear was like a weaver's beam."
- Other evangelical translations, such as the New International Version and New English Translation, have followed the King James Version in modifying 2 Samuel 21.19, with the latter offering an apologetic argument that the text had become corrupt in transmission.
- Some commentators believe that the Goliath killed by Elhanan was different than the Goliath killed by David. They argue that Goliath was a nickname for Lahmi, similar to how John the Baptist was nicknamed as Elias, or that Lahmi adopted Goliath as a second name after the real Goliath's death.

== See also ==
- Books of Chronicles
- Book of Samuel
- Elhanan, son of Dodo, one of David's elite warriors
- Tahrif
