= Giloh =

Ancient town of Judah

Giloh was a city in Judah. The biblical town has been identified with modern Beit Jala, in the West Bank.

Ahitophel, one of King David's chief advisors, came from Giloh (Book of Joshua, Joshua 15:51; cf. 2nd Samuel, 2 Samuel 15:12). Ahitophel was the grandfather of Bathsheba, "a daughter of Eliam", one of David's "thirty" (2 Samuel 23:34; cf. 1 Chronicles, 1 Chronicles 3:5).

== Biblical era ==
A site dating to the period of Israelite settlement during Iron Age I (1200 – 1000 BC) was identified and excavated at the nearby modern suburb of Gilo. The site revealed a small planned settlement with dwellings along the perimeter of the site, together with pottery dating to the twelfth century BC. The southern part of the Iron Age site at Gilo is believed to be one of the earliest Israelite sites from this period. The site was surrounded by a defensive wall and divided into large yards, possibly sheep pens, with houses at the edges. Buildings at the site are amongst the earliest examples of the pillared four room house characteristic of Iron Age Israelite architecture, featuring a courtyard divided by stone pillars, a rectangular back room and rooms along the courtyard. The foundations of a structure built of large stones were also uncovered, possibly a fortified defense tower.

The biblical town of Giloh is mentioned in the Book of Joshua (Joshua 15:51) and the Book of Samuel (II Sam 15:12). Some scholars believe that biblical Giloh was located in the central Hebron Hills, whereas the name of the modern settlement was chosen because of its proximity to Beit Jala, possibly a corruption of Giloh. During the construction of Gilo, archaeologists discovered a fortress and agricultural implements from the period of the First Temple period above the shopping center on Rehov Haganenet. Between Givat Canada and Gilo Park, they unearthed the remains of a farm and graves from the Second Temple period. Roman and Byzantine remains have also been found at various sites.
