= The Knights Abishai, Sibbecai and Benaiah bring King David Water =

Painting by Konrad Witz

The Knights Abishai, Sibbecai and Benaiah bring King David water
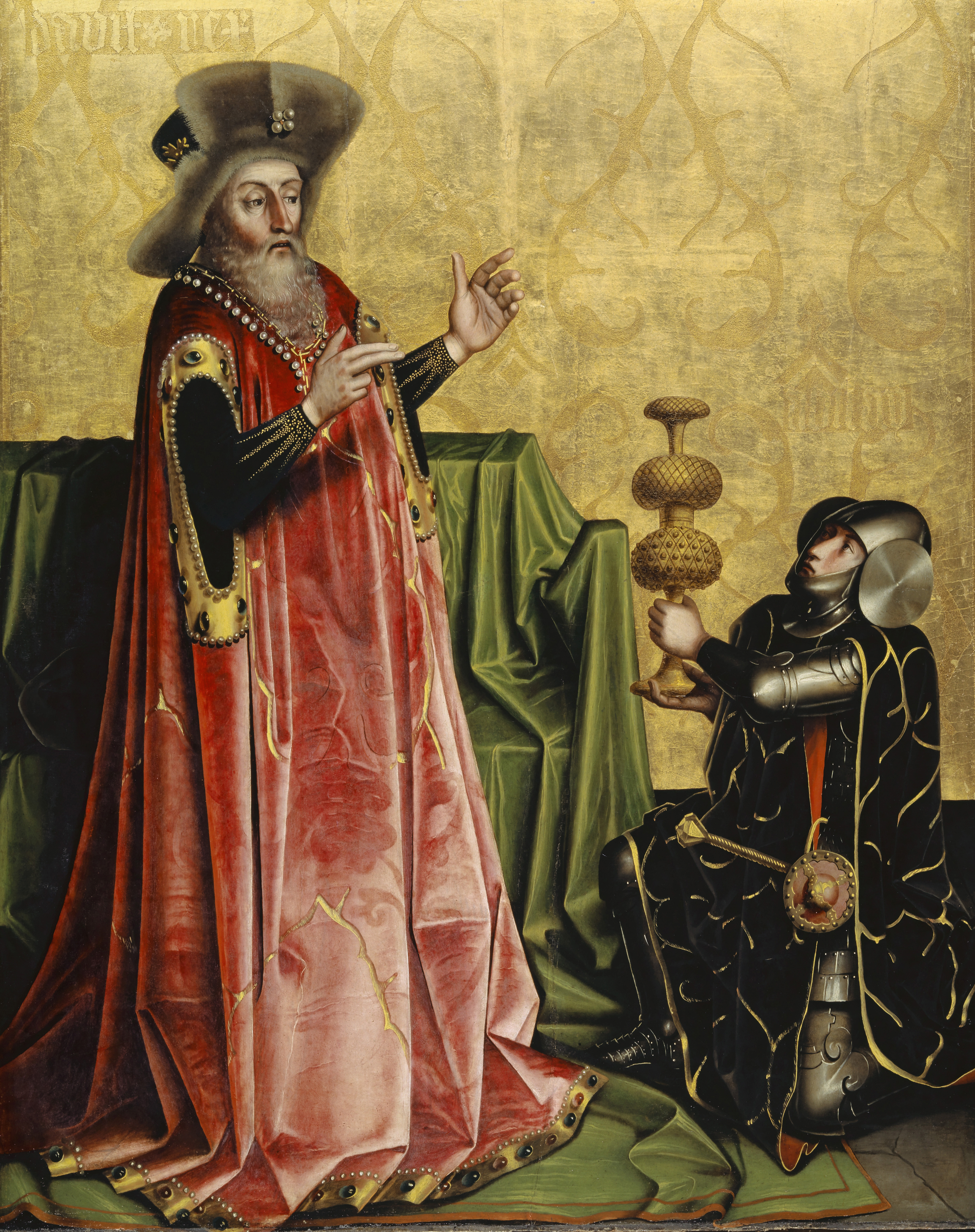
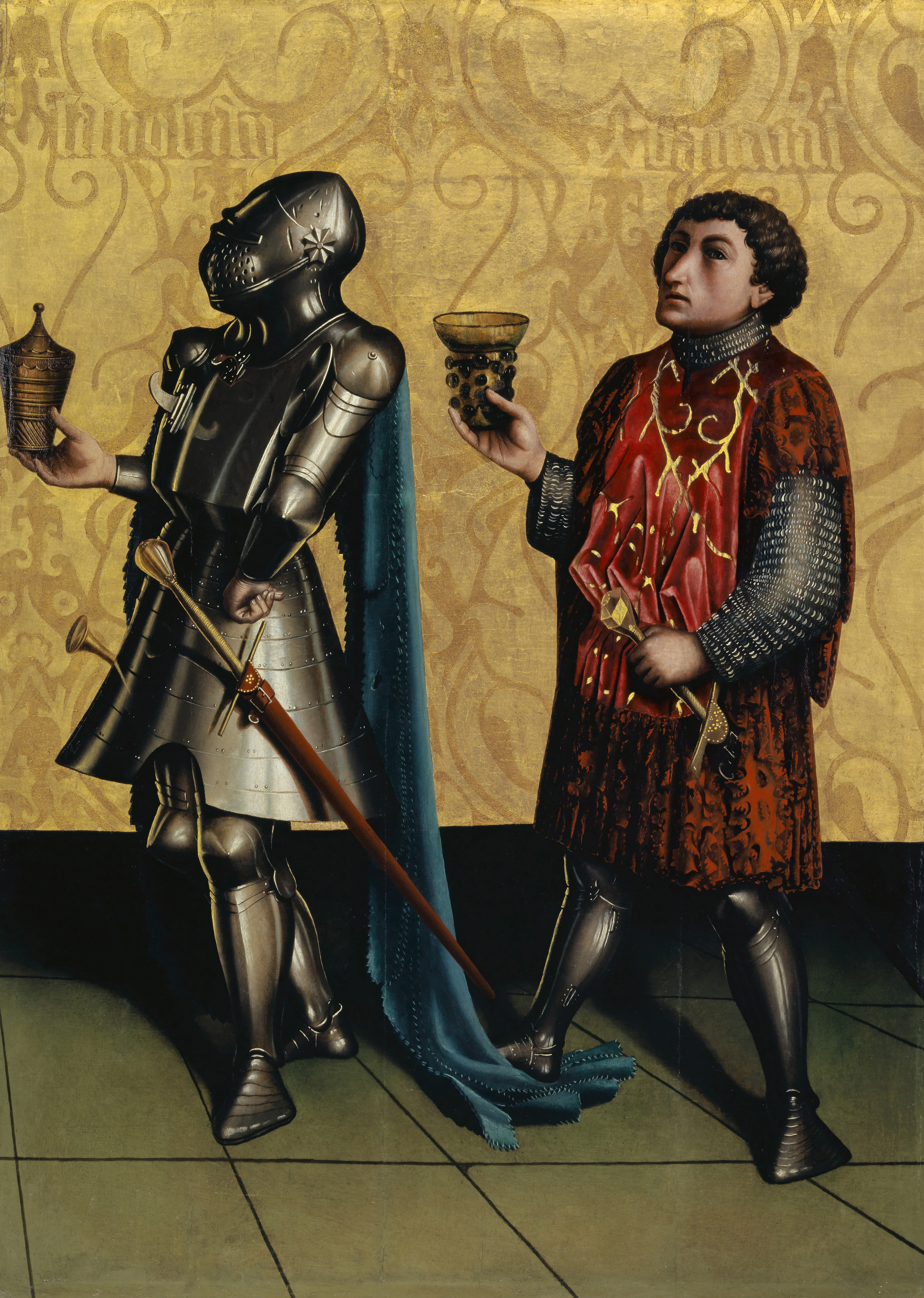
- David and Abishai (left), Sibbecai and Benaiah (right)
- Artist: Konrad Witz
- Year: 1435
- Type: Mixed media on oak wood covered with canvas
- Dimensions: left panel: 101.5 x 81 cm: right panel: 97.5 x 70 cm
- Location: Kunstmuseum Basel; Basel
- Accession: Inventory nos 641 and 642

The Knights Abishai, Sibbecai and Benaiah Bring King David Water are a pair of side panels from a large polyptych altarpiece painted c. 1435 by the German-born artist Konrad Witz. They are now in the collection of the Kunstmuseum Basel in Basel, Switzerland.

== Background ==
The two panels were originally the left and right panels in the lower row on the inside of the right wing of the Mirror of Salvation Altarpiece (Heilsspiegel Altarpiece) in St Leonard's Church, Basel. They are considered to be amongst the artist's best work. The name of the altarpiece comes from its depiction of scenes from the Speculum Humanae Salvationis (or Mirror of Human Salvation), an illustrated book of popular theology written in Latin in the Middle Ages. The St. Leonard's altar was later dismantled and much of it lost.

== Description ==
The pictures jointly portray a scene from a story in the Old Testament (2 Samuel 23:13–17). During a war with the Philistines, who were encamped at Bethlehem, King David, during a meeting with his chief warriors had exclaimed, “Oh, that someone would get me a drink of water from the well near the gate of Bethlehem!". Three of his best warriors (Abishai, Sibbecai and Benaiah) stole through the Philistine positions, drew water from the well and carried it back to the king. David, however, would not drink it, pouring it instead on the ground as an offering to God with the words “Far be it from me, Lord, to drink this! Is it not the blood of men who went at the risk of their lives?”

== See also ==
- 100 Great Paintings, 1980 BBC series
