= Elhanan, son of Dodo =

Son of Dodo in the Hebrew Bible

The Biblical Elhanan (Hebrew: אֶלְחָנָן ʾElḥānān) was the son of Dodo (2 Samuel 23:24, 1 Chronicles 11:26). He was a member of King David’s elite fighters known as The Thirty.

== Interpretation ==
Moshe Garsiel believes he was in fact the same person as the Elhanan mentioned in 2 Samuel 21:19 and 1 Chronicles 20:5, the son of Jair from Bethlehem, and that the Bible is crediting him as the killer of Goliath. To explain the discrepancies in the text, Garsiel says that they are the same Elhanan and concludes "that Elhanan is David’s previous name before he became king."

However, the view of most scholars is that the latter Elhanan was a different figure, and that Elhanan ben Jair was the person originally credited as slaying Goliath before the text was redacted by the Deuteronomist.
