= Benaiah =

Biblical character

Benaiah (Hebrew: בניה, "Yahweh builds up") is a common name in the Hebrew Bible.

== Etymology ==
In the etymology of the name, the first part of Benaiah comes from the root-verb בנה (bana), which is a common Hebrew verb meaning "to build". The second part of Benaiah is יה (Yah), which is not a derivative of the Tetragrammaton, but a contraction of it (ie, the first and last consonants of יהוה are contracted as יה).

== Benaiah, son of Jehoiada ==
The most famous Benaiah referenced in the Tanakh is the son of Jehoiada, who came from the southern Judean town of Kabzeel.

According to the text, Benaiah was one of David's Mighty Warriors, commander of the third rotational army division; (2 Samuel 23:20; 1 Chronicles 27:5). He helped David's son Solomon become king, killed Solomon's enemies, and served as the chief of Solomon's army. On Solomon's instructions he was responsible for the deaths of Adonijah (1 Kings 2:25), Joab (1 Kings 2:34) and Shimei (1 Kings 2:46). He was in charge of the Cherethites and Pelethites. Several verses in 1 Kings 1 illustrate Benaiah's close association with Solomon's party and his exclusion from Adonijah's faction. He is also mentioned in 2 Samuel 8:18, 23:20–23, 30 and 1 Chronicles 27:5–6.

== Gravesite ==
According to Rabbi Hayyim Vital, the grave of Benaiah is in Biriya. In 1869, Rabbi Yosef Hayyim of Baghdad visited the grave and stayed there for a few days. In the introduction to his book, "Ben Ish Chai", he wrote that "many and great secrets" were revealed to him there, and even that "his soul came from the soul of Baniahu ben Yehoida," and that is why he named his books after him.

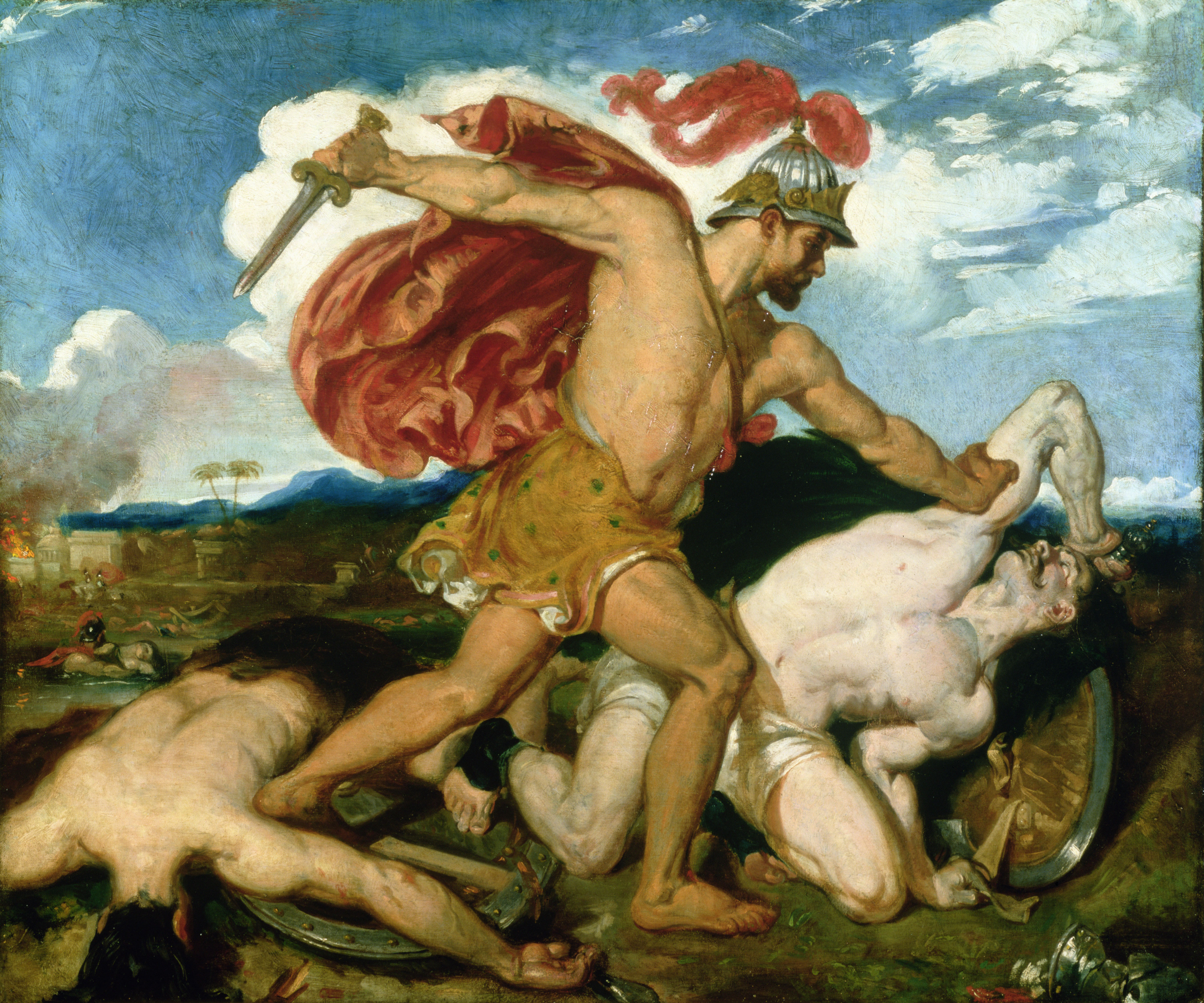
Benaiah, depicted killing a man of Moab by William Etty 1829

== Other Benaiahs ==
Other Benaiahs depicted in the Hebrew Bible include:

- Another of David's mighty men, an Ephraimite from Pirathon, commander of the 11th rotational army division (1 Chr. 11:31, 1 Chr. 27:14, 2 Sam. 23:30)
- A Levite musician who played his stringed instrument while accompanying the Ark of the Covenant when it was brought to Jerusalem and placed in the tent David had prepared for it (1 Chr. 15:18, 20; 16:1, 5).
- A priest who played the trumpet when the Ark was brought to Jerusalem during David's reign (1 Chr. 15:24; 16:6).
- A Levite descendant of Asaph, son of Berachiah the Gershonite and who has a son named Zechariah (2 Chr. 20:14).
- A Simeonite, possibly a contemporary of King Hezekiah (1 Chr. 4:24, 36–43).
- A Levite appointed by Hezekiah to help care for the bounteous contributions to Jehovah's house (2 Chr. 31:12, 13).
- Father of Pelatiah, one of the wicked princes seen in Ezekiel’s vision (Eze. 11:1, 13).
- Four men who, at Ezra's admonition, dismissed their foreign wives and sons. These four were descendants of Parosh, Pahath-Moab, Bani, and Nebo respectively (Ezr. 10:25, 30, 34, 35, 43, 44).
