= 2 Samuel 21 =

Second Book of Samuel chapter

- ← chapter 20 chapter 22 →
- The pages containing the Books of Samuel (1 & 2 Samuel) Leningrad Codex (1008 CE).
- Book: First book of Samuel
- Hebrew Bible part: Nevi'im
- Order in the Hebrew part: 3
- Category: Former Prophets
- Christian Bible part: Old Testament
- Order in the Christian part: 10

2 Samuel 21 is the twenty-first chapter of the Second Book of Samuel in the Old Testament of the Christian Bible or the second part of Books of Samuel in the Hebrew Bible. According to Jewish tradition the book was attributed to the prophet Samuel, with additions by the prophets Gad and Nathan, but modern scholars view it as a composition of a number of independent texts of various ages from c. 630–540 BCE. This chapter contains the account of David's reign in Jerusalem. This is within a section comprising 2 Samuel 21–24 containing the appendices to the Books of Samuel.

== Text ==
This chapter was originally written in the Hebrew language. It is divided into 22 verses.

=== Textual witnesses ===
Some early manuscripts containing the text of this chapter in Hebrew are of the Masoretic Text tradition, which includes the Codex Cairensis (895), Aleppo Codex (10th century), and Codex Leningradensis (1008). Fragments containing parts of this chapter in Hebrew were found among the Dead Sea Scrolls including 1Q7 (1QSam; 50 BCE) with extant verses 16–19 and 4Q51 (4QSam^{a}; 100–50 BCE) with extant verses 1, 3–6, 8–9, 12, 15–17.

Extant ancient manuscripts of a translation into Koine Greek known as the Septuagint (originally was made in the last few centuries BCE) include Codex Vaticanus (B; $\mathfrak{G}$^{B}; 4th century) and Codex Alexandrinus (A; $\mathfrak{G}$^{A}; 5th century). (Note: The whole book of 2 Samuel is missing from the extant Codex Sinaiticus.)

=== Old Testament references ===
- 2 Samuel 21:23–26: 2 Samuel 8:15–18

== Analysis ==
The miscellaneous collection of narratives, lists, and poems in 2 Samuel 21–24 are appendices to the Books of Samuel, arranged not chronologically, but carefully crafted into a concentric three-tiered structure as follows:

A. National crisis (21:1-14) – David's penultimate public act

B. Lists of David's warriors and accounts of heroic deeds (21:15–22) – David's decline and his exit from military affairs

C. Poem (22:1–51) – A penultimate testament: David sings a song
C'. Poem (23:1–7) – David's ultimate testament

B'. Lists of David's warriors and accounts of heroic deeds (23:8–39) – David's decline and his exit from military affairs

A'. National crisis (24:1–25) – David's final public act

These chapters center on two poems: the Psalm of David in 22:2–51, a review of the mighty acts of God, and the oracle in 23:1–7, an assurance that the Davidic dynasty was to endure, with the focal point of the incipit to David's second poem (23:1): "These are the last words of David" as a notice that the 'David Narrative' is drawing to a close. Directly framing the central poems are the warrior exploits in 21:15–22 and again in 23:8–39 (accompanied by a warrior list) and bracketing in the outer circle are a famine story (21:1–14) and a plague story (24:11-25). The episode related to the Gibeonites in 21:1-14 links to the relationship between David and the house of Saul in the preceding chapter. The final section containing the plague story in 2 Samuel 24 links to the building of Solomon's temple, so appropriately placed right before 1 Kings. After these episodes the next story is King Solomon's succession, so then King David can die (1 Kings 1–2).

== David Avenges the Gibeonites (21:1–14) ==
This section initiates the closing portrait of David by reprising several events from 1 and 2 Samuel, reaching back to Saul's rise to power, his rescue of the people of Jabesh-gilead (1 Samuel 9–11), David's pact with Jonathan (1 Samuel 20:12–17; 20:42), Saul's death and his stealthy burial by the people of Jabesh-Gilead (1 Samuel 31). Long ago David lamented Saul's demise (2 Samuel 1:17-27), now he provided him with a proper burial, a sign of his enduring loyalty to the king he succeeded.

A three-year continuous famine caused by drought led David to enquire of YHWH and received the reason that it was linked to the blood-guilt incurred by the house of Saul for putting the Gibeonites to death (verse 1). In Joshua 9 it is recorded that the Gibeonites who were "Amorites" (verse 2; the inhabitants of the land of Canaan before the Israelite occupation) had an irrevocable treaty with the Israelites to be left alive (verses 19–20), so breaching a treaty would lead to national calamity as is evident from biblical and extrabiblical documents. Saul could have been aggravated by their settlement in Benjaminite territory because he would want to build Gibeon as his capital. There is no supporting account that Saul slaughtered the Gibeonites, but the statement is credible when compared to his dealings with the priests of Nob (1 Samuel 22:6–23). David wished to expiate for the sin of Saul with a royal sacrifice (cf.2 Kings 3:26-7), made 'at the beginning of barley harvest' (verse 9). David's motives in allowing the death of Saulides certainly would come under suspicion, but this narrative (together with its sequel in 2 Samuel 9:1–13) shows that David was not acting solely to gain political advantage, but out of concern for the welfare of the land and in obedience to YHWH's will, for his actions were also tempered by his kindness to Mephibosheth (2 Samuel 9:1–13). After the episode David secured an honorable burial for Saul and Jonathan, as well as for those executed on this occasion.

This whole episode contrasts David and Saul in their fidelity to their oaths, drawing to a theme that was introduced in the first allusions to David in 1 Samuel 13:14 ("the Lord has sought out a man after his own heart") and in 1 Samuel 15:28 ("The Lord has torn the kingdom of Israel from you this very day, and has given it to a neighbor of yours, who is better than you"). After multiple events in the David Narrative illustrate how David proved to be more faithful to God than Saul, this episode provides a final example: Saul's killing of the Gibeonites violated an oath that Israel had sworn to them (2 Samuel 21:2), but David preserved Mephibosheth alive (21:7) to keep the oath he had sworn to Jonathan. In one of his final acts, David had to resolve the problem that Saul's infidelity of oath had left behind.

== Philistine giants destroyed (21:15–22) ==
This section provides a summary of clashes with persons of extraordinary size called 'descendants of the giants' during the wars against the Philistines. The first giant, Ishbi-benob, had hefty armour similar to Goliath (1 Samuel 17:7); he was killed by Abishai. The second giant, Saph, has no details other than he was killed by Sibbecai the Hushathite, who was one of David's elite 'Thirty' (2 Samuel 23:27 following the Septuagint in place of "Mebunnai" in Masoretic Text). Someone related to Goliath, the Gittite, was the third giant (cf. 1 Samuel 17), who was killed by Elhanan, a Bethlehemite. The unnamed fourth giant possessed some abnormal physical characteristics; he was killed by Jonathan, David's nephew.

=== Verse 19 ===
And there was again a battle in Gob with the Philistines, where Elhanan the son of Jaareoregim, a Bethlehemite, slew the brother of Goliath the Gittite, the staff of whose spear was like a weaver's beam.

- Cross reference: 1 Chronicles 20:5

The parallel verse in 1 Chronicles 20, written much later than 2 Samuel, provides clarification to this verse. The comparison of the two versions is as follows: (A: 2 Samuel 21:19; B: 1 Chronicles 20:5; Hebrew text is read from right to left)

A: ויך אלחנן בן־יערי ארגים בית הלחמי את גלית
transliteration: wa·yaḵ ’el·ḥā·nān ben-ya‘·rê ’ō·rə·ḡîm bêṯ ha·laḥ·mî, ’êṯ gā·lə·yāṯ
English: "and slew Elhanan ben Jaare-Oregim bet-ha-Lahmi, (brother) "of Goliath"

B: ויך אלחנן בן־יעיר את־לחמי אחי גלית
transliteration: wa·yaḵ ’el·ḥā·nān ben-yā·‘îr ’eṯ-laḥ·mî, ’ă·ḥî gā·lə·yāṯ
English: "and slew Elhanan ben Jair Lahmi, brother of Goliath"

The underlined words show a relation to Goliath, which is denoted in 2 Samuel 21 with the word "’êṯ" which can be translated as "together with; related to", whereas the newer version (1 Chronicles 20) uses the word "’ă·ḥî" meaning "brother". Thus, Elhanan killed the brother of Goliath, whereas Goliath was killed earlier by David (1 Samuel 17).

== See also ==
- Atonement
- Abishai
- Adriel
- Aiah
- Armoni
- Barzillai
- Bethlehem
- Beth-shan
- Children of Israel
- Elhanan
- Gath
- Gibeah
- Gibeon
- Gilboa
- Goliath
- Hushathite
- Jerusalem
- Joab
- Kingdom of Israel
- Kish
- Michal
- Rizpah
- Saph
- Saul
- Tribe of Benjamin
- Tribe of Judah
- Zadok
- Zelah
- Zeruiah
- Related Bible parts: 2 Samuel 5, 2 Samuel 18

== Sources ==
=== Commentaries on Samuel ===
- Auld, Graeme (2003). "1 & 2 Samuel". In James D. G. Dunn and John William Rogerson (ed.). Eerdmans Commentary on the Bible. Eerdmans. ISBN 9780802837110.
- Bergen, David T. (1996). 1, 2 Samuel. B&H Publishing Group. ISBN 9780805401073.
- Chapman, Stephen B. (2016). 1 Samuel as Christian Scripture: A Theological Commentary. Wm. B. Eerdmans Publishing Company. ISBN 978-1467445160.
- Collins, John J. (2014). "Chapter 14: 1 Samuel 12 – 2 Samuel 25". Introduction to the Hebrew Scriptures. Fortress Press. pp. 277–296. ISBN 978-1451469233.
- Evans, Paul (2018). Longman, Tremper (ed.). 1-2 Samuel. The Story of God Bible Commentary. Zondervan Academic. ISBN 978-0310490944.
- Gordon, Robert (1986). I & II Samuel, A Commentary. Paternoster Press. ISBN 9780310230229.
- Hertzberg, Hans Wilhelm (1964). I & II Samuel, A Commentary (trans. from German 2nd edition 1960 ed.). Westminster John Knox Press. p. 19. ISBN 978-0664223182.
- Morrison, Craig E. (2013). Berit Olam: 2 Samuel. Liturgical Press. ISBN 978-0814682913.
- Steinmann, Andrew (2017). 2 Samuel. Concordia Commentary: a theological exposition of sacred scripture. Concordia Publishing House. ISBN 9780758650061.

=== General ===
- Breytenbach, Andries (2000). "Who Is Behind The Samuel Narrative?". In Johannes Cornelis de Moor and H.F. Van Rooy (ed.). Past, Present, Future: the Deuteronomistic History and the Prophets. Brill. ISBN 9789004118713.
- Coogan, Michael David (2007). Coogan, Michael David; Brettler, Marc Zvi; Newsom, Carol Ann; Perkins, Pheme (eds.). The New Oxford Annotated Bible with the Apocryphal/Deuterocanonical Books: New Revised Standard Version, Issue 48 (Augmented 3rd ed.). Oxford University Press. ISBN 978-0195288810.
- Fitzmyer, Joseph A. (2008). A Guide to the Dead Sea Scrolls and Related Literature. Grand Rapids, MI: William B. Eerdmans Publishing Company. ISBN 9780802862419.
- Halley, Henry H. (1965). Halley's Bible Handbook: an abbreviated Bible commentary (24th (revised) ed.). Zondervan Publishing House. ISBN 0-310-25720-4.
- Hayes, Christine (2015). Introduction to the Bible. Yale University Press. ISBN 978-0300188271.
- Jones, Gwilym H. (2007). "12. 1 and 2 Samuel". In Barton, John; Muddiman, John (eds.). The Oxford Bible Commentary (first (paperback) ed.). Oxford University Press. pp. 196–232. ISBN 978-0199277186.
- Klein, R.W. (2003). "Samuel, books of". In Bromiley, Geoffrey W (ed.). The International Standard Bible Encyclopedia. Eerdmans. ISBN 9780802837844.
- Knight, Douglas A (1995). "Chapter 4 Deuteronomy and the Deuteronomists". In James Luther Mays, David L. Petersen and Kent Harold Richards (ed.). Old Testament Interpretation. T&T Clark. ISBN 9780567292896.
- McKane, William (1993). "Samuel, Book of". In Metzger, Bruce M; Coogan, Michael D (eds.). The Oxford Companion to the Bible. Oxford University Press. pp. 409–413. ISBN 978-0195046458.
- Ulrich, Eugene, ed. (2010). The Biblical Qumran Scrolls: Transcriptions and Textual Variants. Brill.
- Würthwein, Ernst (1995). The Text of the Old Testament. Translated by Rhodes, Erroll F. Grand Rapids, MI: Wm. B. Eerdmans. ISBN 0-8028-0788-7.
