= Ahohite =

Ahohite (a-ho'-hit ) is an epithet applied to the descendants of Ahoah, in particular:

- Dodo (father of Eleazar) (or Dodai), one of David's captains (I Chronicles 27:4)
  - His son Eleazar, one of David's three mightiest heroes (II Samuel 23:9; I Chronicles 11:12)
- Zalmon, one of the thirty (II Samuel 23:28; I Chronicles 11:29).
