= Konrad Witz =

German painter

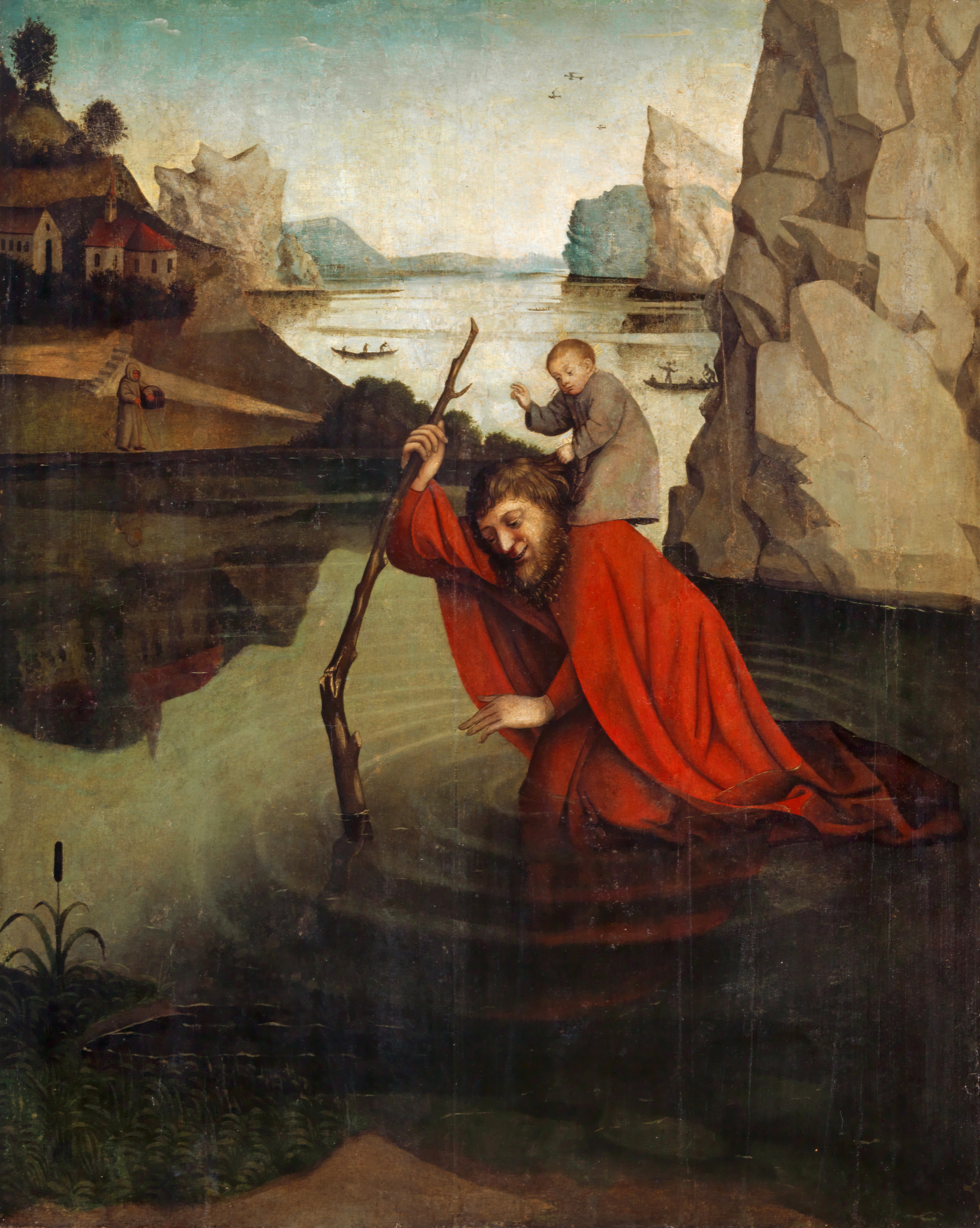
Saint Christopher by Konrad Witz (c. 1435), at the Kunstmuseum, Basel

Konrad Witz (ca.1400/1410 – winter 1445/spring 1446) was a German and Swiss painter, active mainly in Basel.

== Life ==
He was born probably in Rottweil, Germany. In 1434 he entered the painters’ guild in Basel, where he worked most of his life. On 10 January 1435 he acquired Basel citizenship. Sometime afterward he married Ursula Treyger, a niece of the painter Nikolaus Ruesch. Witz is recorded as dead in a document of 1446.

== Works ==
His 1444 panel The Miraculous Draft of Fishes (a portion of a lost altarpiece) has been credited as the earliest extant faithful portrayal of a landscape in European art history, being based on observation of real topographical features.

Witz is most famous for painting three altarpieces, all of which survive only partially. The earliest is the Heilspiegel Altarpiece of about 1435, which today is mostly in the Kunstmuseum, Basel, and with isolated panels in other collections. The next is the Altarpiece of the Virgin (c. 1440), which has been associated with panels now in Basel, Nuremberg, and Strasbourg (Saint Madeleine and Saint Catherine, Musée de l'Œuvre Notre-Dame). Witz's final altarpiece is the St. Peter Altarpiece of 1444, painted for St. Peter's Cathedral, Geneva, and now in the Musée d'Art et d'Histoire, Geneva, which contains his most famous composition, the Miraculous Draft of Fishes.

The painting of St. Christopher (Kunstmuseum, Basel; illustrated) does not seem to be related to these major altarpieces. Other independent works by Witz and his followers can be found in Naples, Berlin, and New York (Frick Collection). The Ambraser Hofjagdspiel is attributed to him.

Witz rendered surfaces and textures with great precision, and was adept at creating depth with the use of cast shadows. According to Detlef Zinke, Witz was "one of the great innovators in northern European painting", whose "sturdy, monumental figures" enact scenes that are dignified and static, in contrast to the emotive style of earlier German painters. Nevertheless, he had little influence on the course of German art, and was largely forgotten until the publication of a monograph by Daniel Burckhardt in 1901.

== See also ==
- The Knights Abishai, Sibbecai and Benaiah bring King David Water, Konrad Witz, 1435, part of the Heilspiegel Altarpiece
