= Mount Gaash =

Mount Gaash was the name of a hill in ancient Israel, in the mountainous region of Ephraim, mentioned several times in the Hebrew Bible. It is mentioned as a place of torrent valleys, which may refer to ravines in the vicinity:

- Joshua son of Nun was buried in the hill country of Ephraim, which was north of Mount Gaash.
- Hurai from the "Ravines of Gaash" participated as one of David's Mighty Warriors in conquering the City of David.
