= Pahath-Moab =

Pahath-moab (Hebrew "Pit of Moab") was the ancestor of a Judahite clan that returned from the Babylonian Exile and assisted in rebuilding Jerusalem. (Book of Ezra 2:6; 8:4; 10:30; Book of Nehemiah 3:11, 7:11, 10:14)

The meaning is most likely that this individual was held captive in Moab. Probably as evidenced from "Nebo" or "The Other Nebo" in Ezra and Nehemiah, there were these two captives in Moab (Ezra 2:29, 10:43; Nehemiah 7:33). Nebo is the name of a city of the Moabites (Is. 15:2, 46:1). Babylon had possession of the entire Earth, according to the Book of Daniel 2:38, so it is likely that when Cyrus the Great brought back the captives, there were these two residing in the land of Moab (Is. 44:28, 45:1; Ezra 1:2).

== See also ==
- Pakhtun
- Paktia
- Pakthas
- Ten Lost Tribes
