= Shammah =

Name mentioned several times in the Hebrew Bible

Shammah is a name mentioned several times in the Hebrew Bible.

In the Book of Samuel, Shammah (Hebrew: שַׁמָּה) was the son of Agee, a Hararite (2 Samuel 23:11) or Harodite (23:25), and one of King David's three legendary "mighty men". His greatest deed was the defeat of a troop of Philistines. After the Israelites fled from the troop of Philistines, Shammah stood alone and defeated them himself. He is credited with having single-handedly defeated these Philistine soldiers at a lentil patch.

It is also possible Shammah is mentioned in Judges as Shamgar, who defeated 600 men of the Philistines with an ox goad. This may have been the same battle of the lentil field mentioned in the Book of Samuel, though this event was textually placed several generations before the version in Samuel.

There are other people named Shammah in the Bible who are mentioned only in passing.

- A son of Reuel the son of Esau, an Edomite tribal leader.
- Shammah or Shimeah, the third son of Jesse and brother of King David.
