= Ahoah =

Bible character

Ahoah ("brotherly") was one of the sons of Bela, the son of Benjamin (1 Chronicles 8:4). He is also called Ahiah (ver. 8:7) and Iri (1 Chronicles 7:7). His descendants were called Ahohites (2 Samuel 23:9, 28).
