= Goliath =

Philistine giant in the Bible

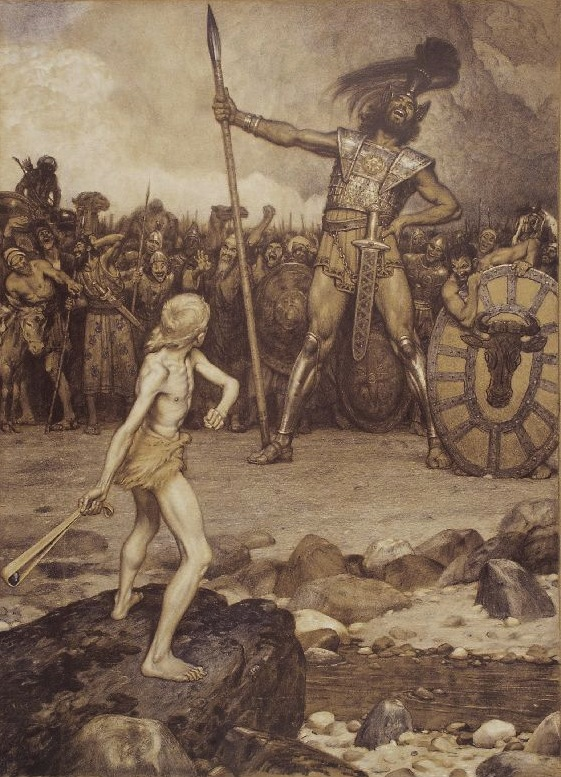
David and Goliath (1888) by Osmar Schindler

Goliath (Note: Hebrew: גָּלְיָת, romanized: Goləyāṯ; Arabic: جُليات, romanized: Julyāt (Christian term) or جَالُوت, Jālūt (Quranic term)) (/ɡə.ˈlaɪ.əθ/ gə-LY-əth) is a legendary Philistine warrior of giant stature attested to in the Biblical narratives of 1 and 2 Samuel.

The scholarly consensus holds that, of the two accounts of Goliath in Biblical scripture, the older text depicts Goliath as being killed by Elhanan, son of Jaare-oregim, as described by the author of 2 Samuel 21:19. In 1 Samuel 17 Goliath plays a more expansive and pivotal antagonistic role within the biography of King David. According to this narrative, Goliath challenges the Israelites to send forward a champion to defeat him in single combat. David, then a young shepherd, takes up the challenge. He fells Goliath with a stone slung from a sling before beheading the fallen giant with his own sword. The narrative crediting David with the feat in 1 Samuel has become the more popular and well-known, but the account in 2 Samuel 21 crediting Elhanan is generally considered to be the older, source text that the author of 1 Samuel drew from to fold Goliath into David's own legendary origin story to serve as both foil to David and symbol of King Saul's unfitness to rule, as Saul did not take up the giant's challenge himself.

The phrase "David and Goliath" has taken on a broader, metaphorical meaning denoting an underdog situation, a contest wherein a smaller, weaker opponent faces a much bigger, stronger adversary. Some modern scholars now believe that the original slayer of Goliath in the text may have been Elhanan, son of Jair, who features in 2 Samuel 21:19, in which Elhanan kills Goliath the Gittite, and that the authors of the Deuteronomistic history changed the original text to credit the victory to the more famous figure of David.

== Biblical accounts ==
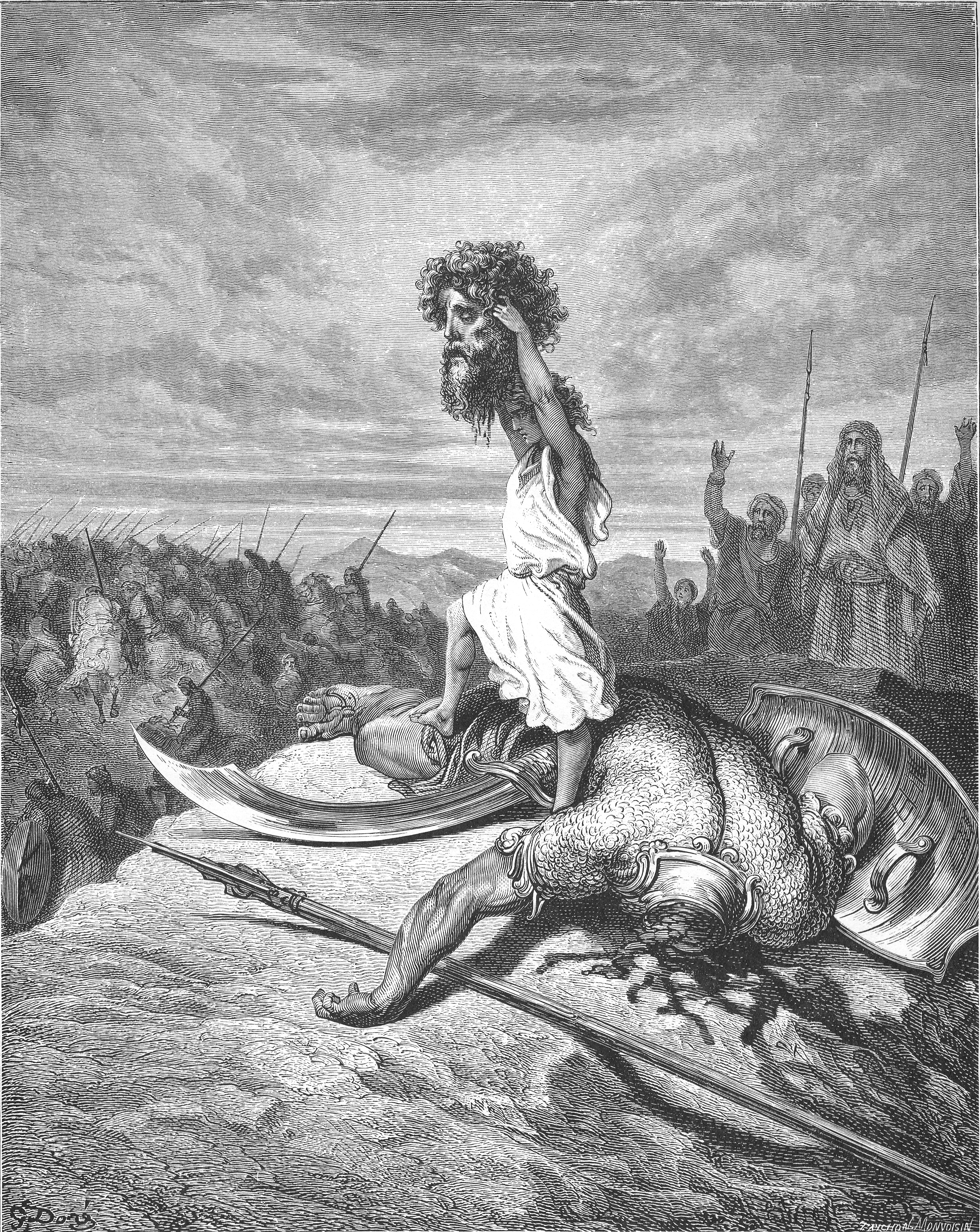
David hoists the severed head of Goliath as illustrated by Gustave Doré (1866)

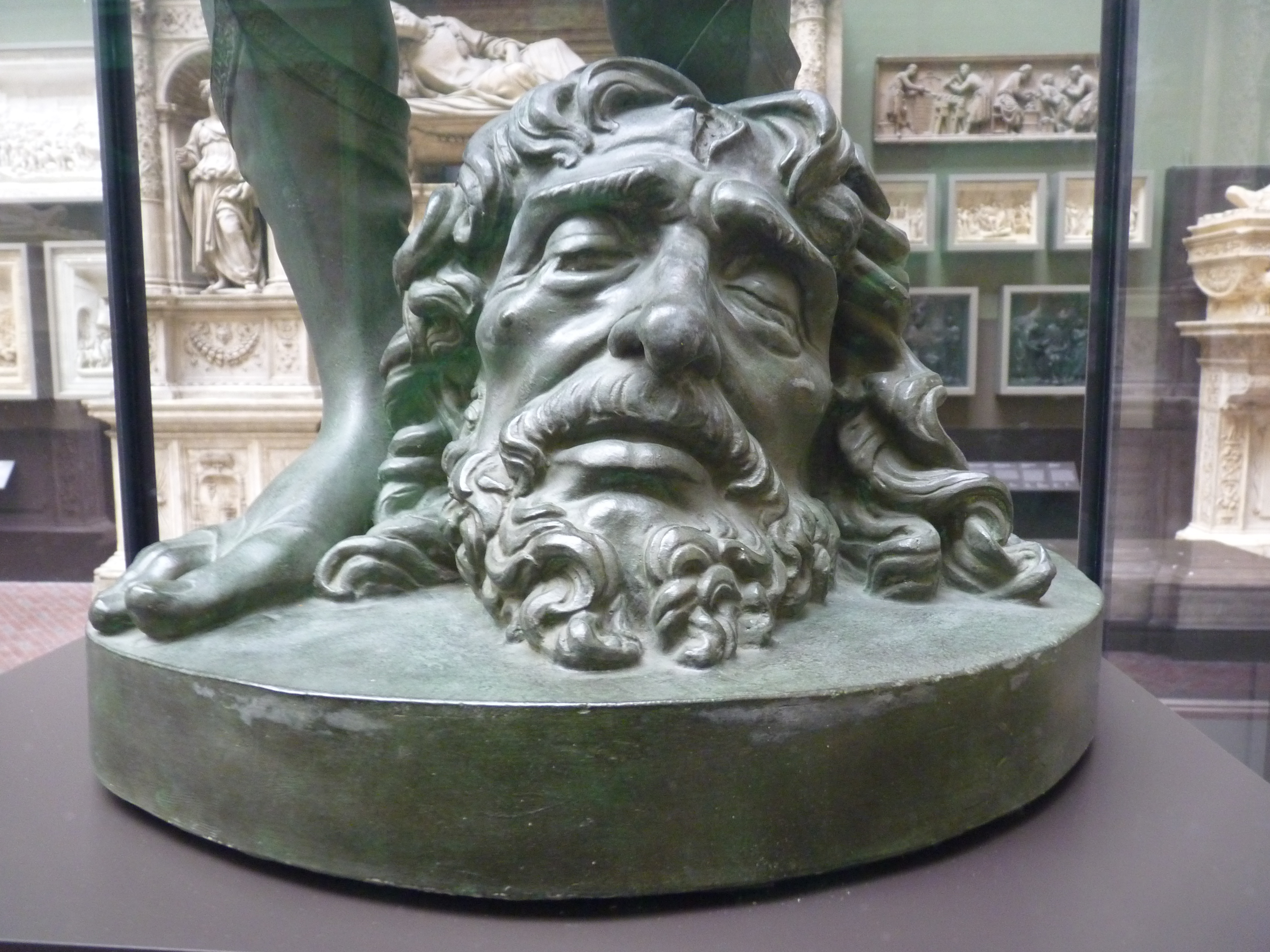
Head of Goliath (V&A, Casts room)

In 1 Samuel 17, Saul and the Israelites are facing the Philistines in the Valley of Elah. Twice a day for 40 days, morning and evening, Goliath, the champion of the Philistines, comes out between the lines and challenges the Israelites to send out a champion of their own to decide the outcome in single combat, but Saul is afraid. Eventually, David accepts the challenge. Saul reluctantly agrees and offers David his armour, but he declines, taking only his staff, sling, and five stones from a brook.

David and Goliath confront each other, Goliath with his armor and javelin, David with his staff and sling. "The Philistine cursed David by his gods", but David replies:

"This day the Lord will deliver you into my hand, and I will strike you down, and I will give the dead bodies of the host of the Philistines this day to the birds of the air and to the wild beasts of the earth; that all the earth may know that there is a god in Israel and that all this assembly may know that God saves not with sword and spear; for the battle is God's, and he will give you into our hand."

— 1 Samuel 17:46–47

David hurls a stone from his sling and hits Goliath in the center of his forehead, Goliath falls on his face to the ground, and David cuts off his head. The Philistines flee and are pursued by the Israelites "as far as Gath and the gates of Ekron". David puts the armor of Goliath in his own tent and takes the head to Jerusalem, and Saul sends Abner to bring the boy to him. The king asks whose son he is, and David answers:

"I am the son of your servant Jesse the Bethlehemite."

— 1 Samuel 17:58

== Composition of the Book of Samuel ==
The Books of Samuel, together with the books of Joshua, Judges and Kings, make up a unified history of Israel which biblical scholars call the Deuteronomistic History. The first edition of the history was probably written at the court of Judah's King Josiah (late 7th century BCE) and a revised second edition during the exile (6th century BCE), with further revisions in the post-exilic period. Traces of this can be seen in contradictions within the Goliath story, such as that between 1 Samuel 17:54, which says that David took Goliath's head to Jerusalem, although according to 2 Samuel 5 Jerusalem at that time was still a Jebusite stronghold and was not captured until David became king. (Note: Not all scholars agree that the account in 1 Samuel 17:54 contradicts the one in 2 Samuel 5, and various explanations have been proposed as to why David would have brought Goliath's head to the Jebusite stronghold of Jerusalem. Hoffmeier (2011), drawing on Ancient Near Eastern comparative data, suggests that David was performing a symbolic action intended to announce his victory over Goliath as well as to intimidate the Jebusites.)

== Structure of the David and Goliath narrative ==
The Septuagint text contains a significantly shorter version of the David and Goliath story than the Masoretic text. Critical scholars disagree over whether the Septuagint is the original narrative, arguing that the Masoretic redactors incorporated the separate additions later (the Addition Hypothesis), or whether the Masoretic is the original narrarive, arguing that the Septuagint redactors excluded redundant or superfluous elements (the Omission Hypothesis).

Septuagint (short)

- The Israelites and Philistines face each other; Goliath makes his challenge to single combat;
- David volunteers to fight Goliath;
- David selects five smooth stones from a creek-bed to be used in his sling;
- David's courage strengthens others and eventually others defeat four other giants, possibly brothers, but relatives, reference 2 Samuel 21:15–22.
- David defeats Goliath, the Philistines flee the battlefield.

Elements in Masoretic not in Septuagint (long)

- David is sent by his father to bring food to his brothers, hears the challenge, and expresses his desire to accept;
- Details of the account of the battle;
- Saul asks who David is, and he is introduced to the king through Abner. (Note: Compare texts of short and long versions of 1 Samuel 17.)

== Textual considerations ==
=== Goliath's height ===
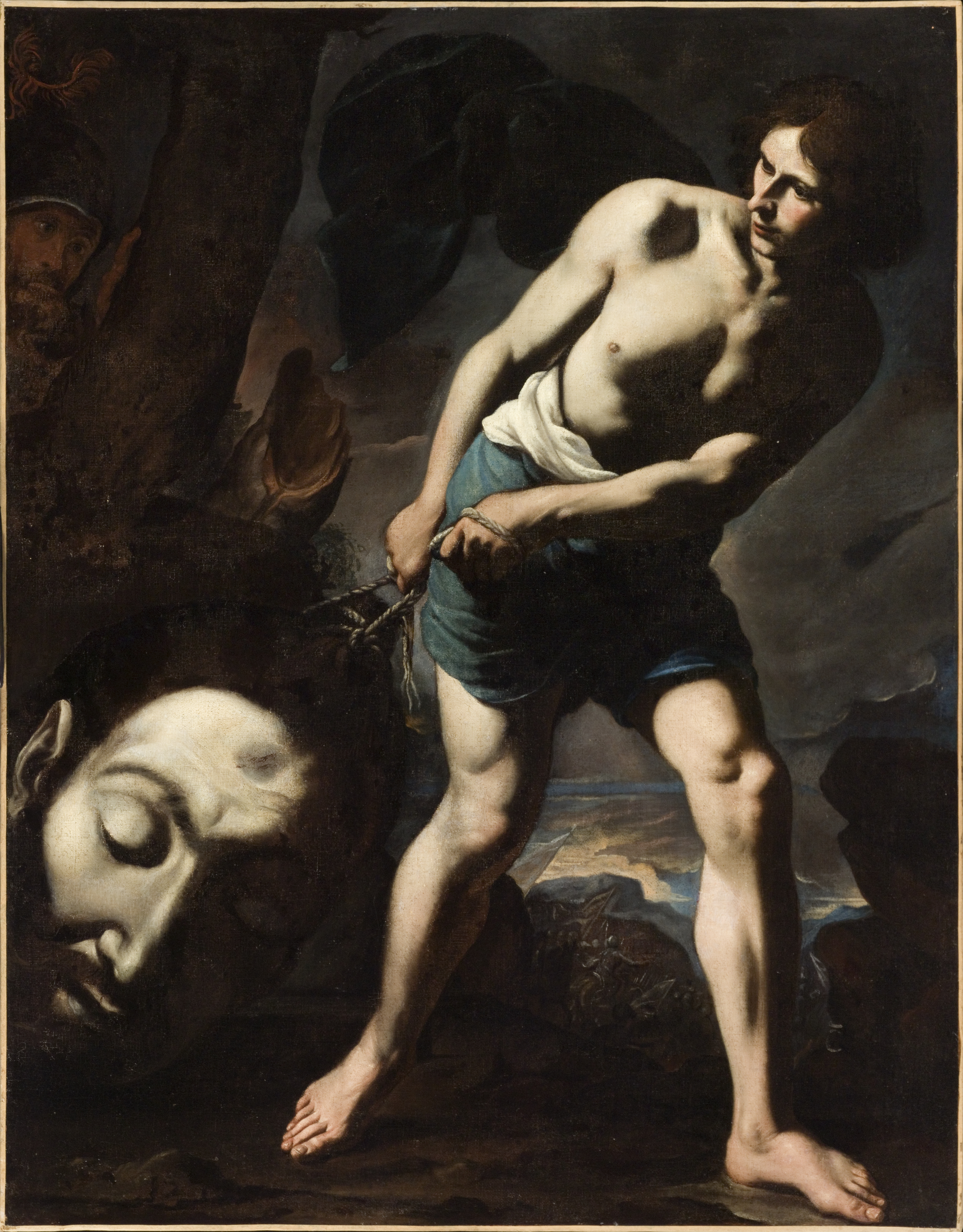
David with the Head of Goliath, c. 1635, by Andrea Vaccaro

The Dead Sea Scrolls text of Samuel from the late 1st century BCE, the 1st-century CE historian Josephus, and the Septuagint all give Goliath's height as "four cubits and a span" (6 feet 9 inches or 2.06 metres), whereas the Masoretic Text has "six cubits and a span" (9 feet 9 inches or 2.97 metres). Many scholars have suggested that the smaller number grew in the course of transmission (only a few have suggested the reverse, that an original larger number was reduced), possibly when a scribe's eye was drawn to the number six in line 17:7.

=== Goliath and Saul ===
The underlying purpose of the story of Goliath is to show that Saul is not fit to be king (but that David is). Saul was chosen to lead the Israelites against their enemies, but when faced with Goliath, he refuses to do so; Saul is a head taller than anyone else in all Israel (1 Samuel 9:2), which implies he was over 6.2 feet (1.9 m) tall and the obvious challenger for Goliath, yet David is the one who eventually defeated him. Also, Saul's armour and weaponry are apparently no better than Goliath's:

"David declares that when a lion or bear came and attacked his father's sheep, he battled against it and killed it, [but Saul] has been cowering in fear instead of rising up and attacking the threat to his sheep (i.e., Israel)."

David's speech in 1 Samuel 17 can be interpreted as referring to both Saul and Goliath through its animal imagery. When this imagery is considered closely, David can be seen to function as the true king who manipulates wild beasts.

=== Elhanan and Goliath ===
In 2 Samuel 21, verse 19, the Hebrew Bible tells how Goliath was killed by "Elhanan the son of Jaare-oregim, the Bethlehemite". The fourth-century BC 1 Chronicle 20:5 explains the second Goliath by saying that Elhanan "slew Lahmi the brother of Goliath". This is thought by biblical source critics to have constructed the name Lahmi from the last portion of the word "Bethlehemite" ("beit-ha'lahmi"). Regardless, the Hebrew text at Goliath's name in 2 Samuel 21 makes no mention of the word "brother". Most scholars dismiss the later 1 Chronicles 20:5 material as "an obvious harmonization".

=== Goliath and the Greeks ===
The armor described in 1 Samuel 17 appears typical of Greek armor of the sixth century BCE; narrative formulae such as the settlement of battle by single combat between champions has been thought characteristic of the Homeric epics (the Iliad) rather than of the ancient Near East. The designation of Goliath as a איש הביניים, "man of the in-between" (a longstanding difficulty in translating 1 Samuel 17) appears to be a borrowing from Greek "man of the metaikhmion (μεταίχμιον)", i.e., the space between two opposite army camps where champion combat would take place. Other scholars argue the description is a trustworthy reflection of the armaments that a Philistine warrior would have worn in the tenth century BCE. (Note: Hoffmeier (2011): "A number of critical evalua-tions of more minimalist readings of David and Goliath duel quickly followed Finkelstein and A. Yadin's articles. Philip King's analysis of Goliath's weapons in the Seymour Gitin Festschrift is worth men-tioning.^{33} Contrary to Finkelstein's conclusion, King determines that "Goliath's bronze helmet, cuirass, greaves, long range bronze jav-elin, spear with socketed blade, shield-bearer, and sword have their counterparts in the repertoire of a Mycenaean soldier."^{34} He flatly rejects the portrayal of Goliath as a 7th century Greek hoplite. In the Lawrence Stager Fest-schrift, Alan Millard likewise offered a critical response to Finkel-stein and A. Yadin.^{35} Most recently, Moshe Garsiel wrote a comprehen-sive critique of the recent mini-malistic literary and archaeological readings of this classic narrative.^{36}")

A story very similar to that of David and Goliath appears in the Iliad, written c. 760–710 BCE, where Nestor in order to encourage the Greeks to meet a challenge to single combat by Hector recalls when, as a young man, he fought and conquered the giant Ereuthalion. Each giant wields a distinctive weapon—an iron club in Ereuthalion's case, a massive bronze spear in Goliath's; each giant, clad in armor, comes out of the enemy's massed array to challenge all the warriors in the opposing army; in each case the seasoned warriors are afraid, and the challenge is taken up by a stripling, the youngest in his family (Nestor is the twelfth son of Neleus, David the seventh or eighth son of Jesse.) In each case an older and more experienced father figure (Nestor's own father, David's patron Saul) tells the boy that he is too young and inexperienced, but in each case the young hero receives divine aid and the giant is left sprawling on the ground. Nestor, fighting on foot, then takes the chariot of his enemy, while David, on foot, takes the sword of Goliath. The enemy army then flees, the victors pursue and slaughter them and return with their bodies, and the boy-hero is acclaimed by the people. However, some scholars question whether the biblical writers would have ever had access to the Iliad, and argue that the similarities between both tales are also present in other ancient Near Eastern accounts of duels.

=== Goliath's name ===
Tell es-Safi, the biblical Gath and traditional home of Goliath, has been the subject of extensive excavations by Israel's Bar-Ilan University. The archaeologists have established that this was one of the largest of the Philistine cities until it was destroyed in the ninth century BC, an event from which it never recovered. The Tell es-Safi inscription, a potsherd discovered at the site, and reliably dated to between the tenth to mid-ninth centuries BC, is inscribed with the two names ʾLWT and WLT. While the names are not directly connected with the biblical Goliath (גלית, GLYT), they are etymologically related and demonstrate that the name fits with the context of the late tenth- to early ninth-century BC Philistine culture. The name "Goliath" itself is non Semitic and has been linked with the Lydian king Alyattes, which also fits the Philistine context of the biblical Goliath story. A similar name, Uliat, is also attested in Carian inscriptions. Aren Maeir, director of the excavation, comments: "Here we have very nice evidence [that] the name Goliath appearing in the Bible in the context of the story of David and Goliath... is not some later literary creation."

Based on the southwest Anatolian onomastic considerations, Roger D. Woodard proposed *Walwatta as a reconstruction of the form ancestral to both Hebrew Goliath and Lydian Alyattes. In this case, the original meaning of Goliath's name would be "Lion-man," thus placing him within the realm of Indo-European warrior-beast mythology.

The Babylonian Talmud explains the name "Goliath, son of Gath" through a reference to his mother's promiscuity, based on the Aramaic גַּת (gat, winepress), as everyone threshed his mother as people do to grapes in a winepress (Sotah, 42b).

The name sometimes appears in English as Goliah.

== Later traditions ==
=== Judaism ===
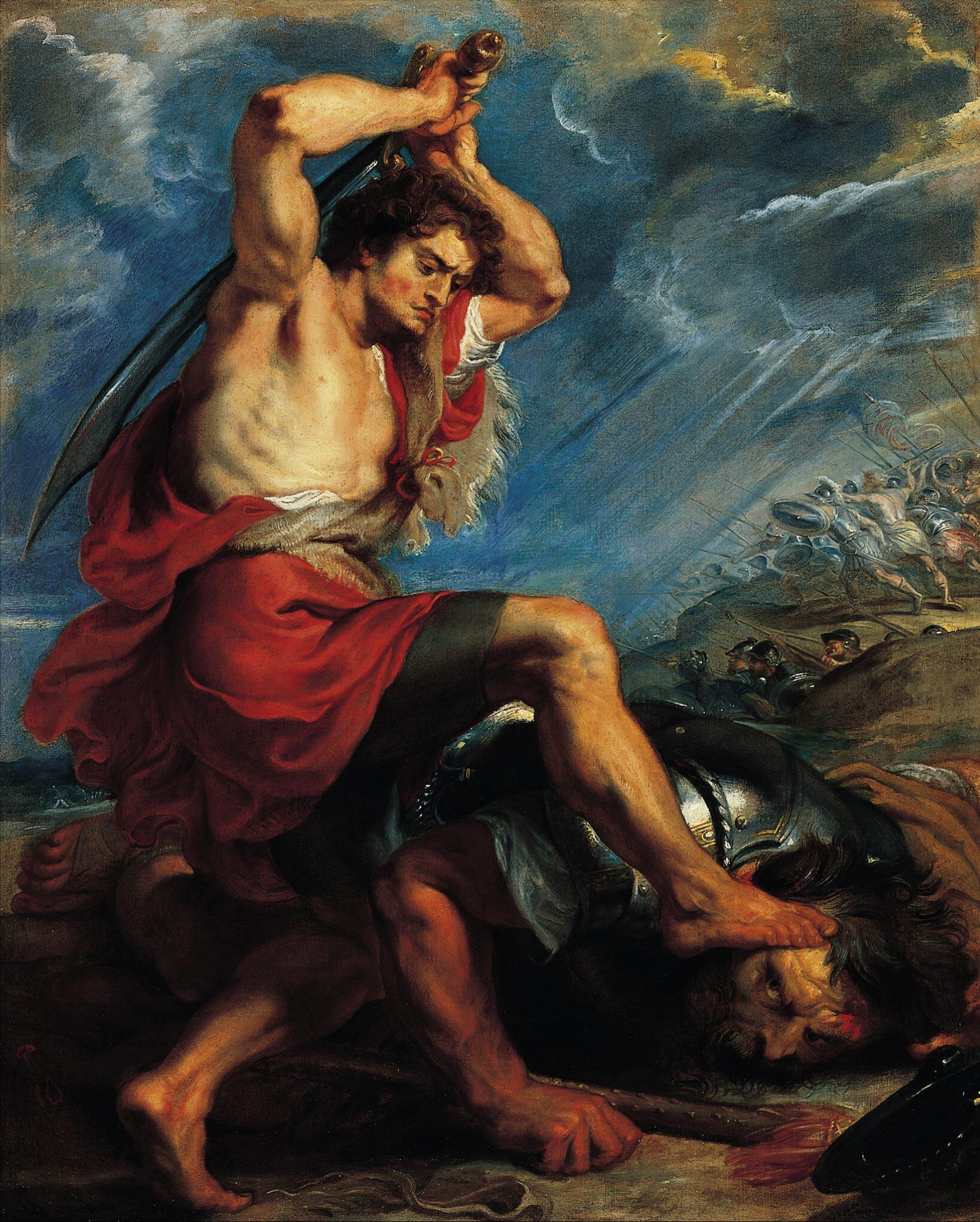
David and Goliath (1616) by Peter Paul Rubens

David Giving Thanks to God (18th century) by Charles Errard

According to the Babylonian Talmud (Sotah 42b), Goliath was a son of Orpah, the sister-in-law of Ruth, David's own great-grandmother (Ruth → Obed → Jesse → David). Ruth Rabbah, a haggadic and homiletic interpretation of the Book of Ruth, makes the blood relationship even closer, considering Orpah and Ruth to have been full sisters. Orpah was said to have made a pretense of accompanying Ruth but after forty paces left her. Thereafter she led a dissolute life. According to the Jerusalem Talmud, Goliath was born by polyspermy, and had about one hundred fathers.

The Talmud stresses Goliath's ungodliness: his taunts before the Israelites included the boast that it was he who had captured the Ark of the Covenant and brought it to the temple of Dagon, and his challenges to combat were made at morning and evening to disturb the Israelites in their prayers. His armor weighed 60 tons, according to rabbi Hanina; 120, according to rabbi Abba bar Kahana; and his sword, which became the sword of David, had marvelous powers. On his death it was found that his heart carried the image of Dagon, who thereby also came to a shameful downfall. (Note: For a brief overview of Talmudic traditions on Goliath, see Jewish Encyclopedia, "Goliath".)

In Pseudo-Philo, believed to have been composed between 135 BCE and 70 CE, David picks up seven stones and writes on them his father's name, his own name, and the name of God, one name per stone; then, speaking to Goliath, he says:

"Hear this word before you die: were not the two women from whom you and I were born, sisters? And your mother was Orpah and my mother Ruth ..."

After David strikes Goliath with the stone he runs to Goliath before he dies, and Goliath says: "Hurry and kill me and rejoice." David replies: "Before you die, open your eyes and see your slayer." Goliath sees an angel and tells David that it is not he who has killed him but the angel. Pseudo-Philo then goes on to say that the angel of the Lord changes David's appearance so that no one recognizes him, and thus Saul asks who he is.

A late Second Temple-era Jewish family tomb located near Jericho, dating from the 1st century CE, was found with multiple ossuaries inscribed with the name "Goliath" attached to the deceased; examples include "Yeho'ezer son of El'azar Goliath," "Salome wife of Yeho'ezer Goliath," and "Shelamzion mother of Yo'ezer Goliath." According to epigraphists, this was not a family name but a nickname originally given to one family member because of his unusual height, which later stuck to his descendants, either out of respect for the ancestor or because they too were physically large.

=== Islam ===
Goliath appears in chapter 2 of the Quran (2:247–252), in the narrative of David and Saul's battle against the Philistines. Called Jalut in Arabic (جالوت), Goliath's mention in the Quran is concise, although it remains a parallel to the account in the Hebrew Bible. Muslim scholars have tried to trace Goliath's origins, most commonly with the Amalekites. Goliath, in early scholarly tradition, became a kind of byword or collective name for the oppressors of the Israelite nation before David. Muslim tradition sees the battle with Goliath as a prefiguration of Muhammad's battle of Badr, and sees Goliath as parallel to the enemies that Muhammad faced.

== Modern usages of David and Goliath ==
In modern usage, the phrase "David and Goliath" has taken on a secular meaning, denoting an underdog situation, a contest where a smaller, weaker opponent faces a much bigger, stronger adversary; if successful, the underdog may win in an unusual or surprising way.

Theology professor Leonard Greenspoon, in his essay, "David vs. Goliath in the Sports Pages", explains that "most writers use the story for its underdog overtones (the little guy wins) ... Less likely to show up in newsprint is the contrast that was most important to the biblical authors: David's victory shows the power of his God, while Goliath's defeat reveals the weakness of the Philistine deities."

The phrase is widely used in news media to succinctly characterize underdog situations in many contexts without religious overtones. Contemporary headlines include: sports ("Haye relishes underdog role in 'David and Goliath' fight with Nikolai Valuev"—The Guardian); business ("On Internet, David-and-Goliath Battle Over Instant Messages"—The New York Times); science ("David and Goliath: How a tiny spider catches much larger prey"—ScienceDaily; politics ("Dissent in Cuba: David and Goliath"—The Economist); social justice ("David-and-Goliath Saga Brings Cable to Skid Row"—Los Angeles Times). The geopolitical conflict between the Philippines and China, in the context of the Spratly Islands dispute, has been likened to a "David and Goliath" scenario.

Aside from the above allegorical use of "David and Goliath", there is also the use of "Goliath" for a particularly tall person. For example, basketball player Wilt Chamberlain was nicknamed "Goliath", which he disliked.

=== The Italian Goliath film series (1960–1964) ===
The Italians used Goliath as an action superhero in a series of biblical adventure films (peplums) in the early 1960s. He possessed amazing strength, and the films were similar in theme to their Hercules and Maciste movies. After the classic Hercules (1958) became a blockbuster sensation in the film industry, the 1959 Steve Reeves film Terrore dei Barbari (Terror of the Barbarians) was retitled Goliath and the Barbarians in the United States, (after Joseph E. Levine claimed the sole right to the name of Hercules); the film was so successful at the box office, it inspired Italian filmmakers to do a series of four more films featuring a beefcake hero named Goliath, although the films were not really related to each other. Note that the Italian film David and Goliath (1960), starring Orson Welles, was not one of these, since that film was a straightforward adaptation of the biblical story.

The four titles in the Italian Goliath series were as follows:

- Goliath contro i giganti/Goliath Against the Giants (1960) starring Brad Harris
- Goliath e la schiava ribelle/Goliath and the Rebel Slave (a.k.a. The Tyrant of Lydia vs. The Son of Hercules) (1963) starring Gordon Scott.
- Golia e il cavaliere mascherato/Goliath and the Masked Rider (a.k.a. Hercules and the Masked Rider) (1964) starring Alan Steel.
- Golia alla conquista di Bagdad/Goliath at the Conquest of Baghdad (a.k.a. Goliath at the Conquest of Damascus, 1964) starring Peter Lupus.

The name Goliath was later inserted into the film titles of three other Italian muscle man movies that were retitled for distribution in the United States in an attempt to cash in on the Goliath craze, but these films were not originally made as Goliath films in Italy.

Both Goliath and the Vampires (1961) and Goliath and the Sins of Babylon (1963) actually featured the famed superhero Maciste in the original Italian versions, but American distributors did not feel the name Maciste had any meaning to American audiences. Goliath and the Dragon (1960) was originally an Italian Hercules film called The Revenge of Hercules.

== In popular culture ==
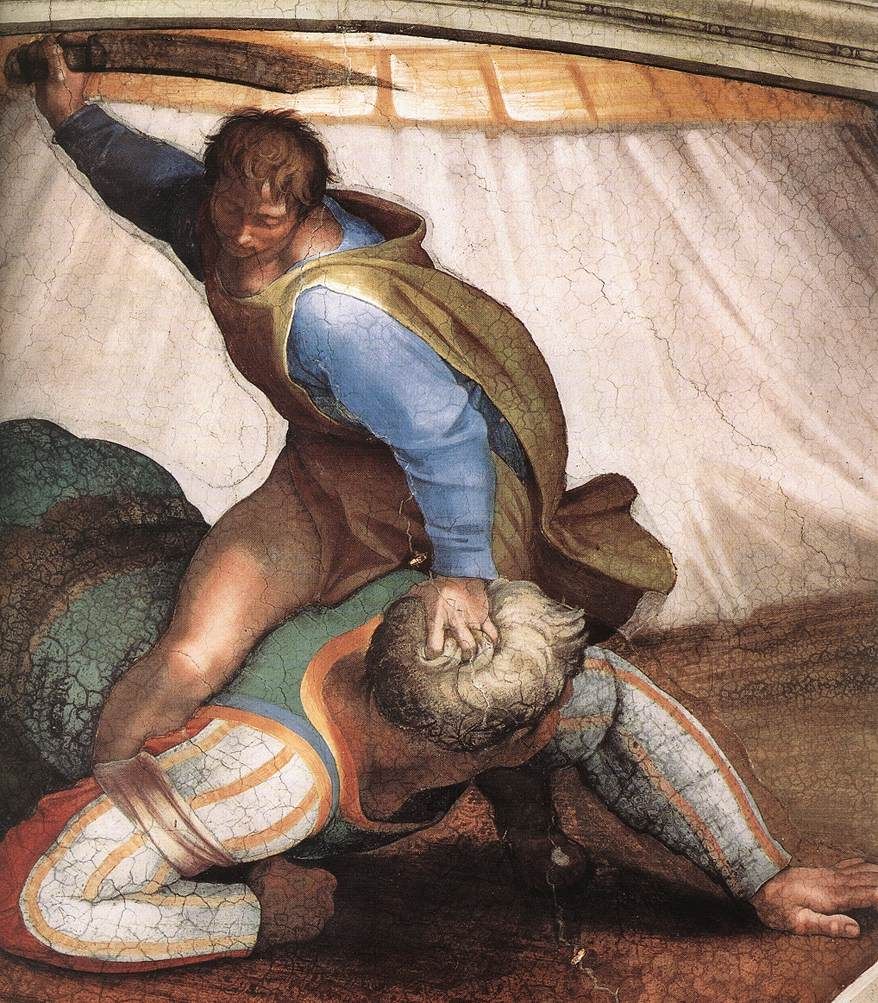
David and Goliath (1509) by Michelangelo, on the Sistine Chapel ceiling

American actor Ted Cassidy portrayed Goliath in the TV series Greatest Heroes of the Bible (1978). Italian actor Luigi Montefiori portrayed this 9 ft 0 in (2.74 m)-tall giant in Paramount's 1985 live-action film King David as part of a flashback. This film includes the King of the Philistines saying: "Goliath has challenged the Israelites six times and no one has responded." It is then on the seventh time that David meets his challenge.

Toho and Tsuburaya Productions collaborated on a film called Daigoro vs. Goliath (1972), which follows the story relatively closely but recasts the main characters as kaiju.

In 1975, Kaveret recorded and released a humorous interpretation of the Goliath story, with several changes made such as Goliath being the "Demon from Ashkelon", and David randomly meeting Goliath rather than dueling each other on a battlefield.

In 2005, Lightstone Studios released a direct-to-DVD movie musical titled "One Smooth Stone", which was later changed to "David and Goliath". It is part of the Liken the scriptures (now just Liken) series of movie musicals on DVD based on scripture stories. Thurl Bailey, a former NBA basketball player, was cast to play the part of Goliath in this film.

In 2009, NBC aired Kings, which has a narrative loosely based on the biblical story of King David, but set in a kingdom that culturally and technologically resembles the present-day United States. The part of Goliath is portrayed by a tank, which David destroys with a shoulder-fired rocket launcher.

In 2018, the 37th season of the reality show Survivor was Survivor: David vs. Goliath. The contestants were grouped in two "tribes" at the start of the season, 'David' and 'Goliath'. The contestants on the David tribe were underdogs who overcame disadvantages and hardships, while those on the Goliath tribe grew up with advantages such as wealth or education.

== See also ==
- Og
- An Army of Davids
- Battle of Ain Jalut
- Gilgamesh
- List of tallest people
- David Plates
