= Cave of Adullam =

Biblical stronghold and story setting

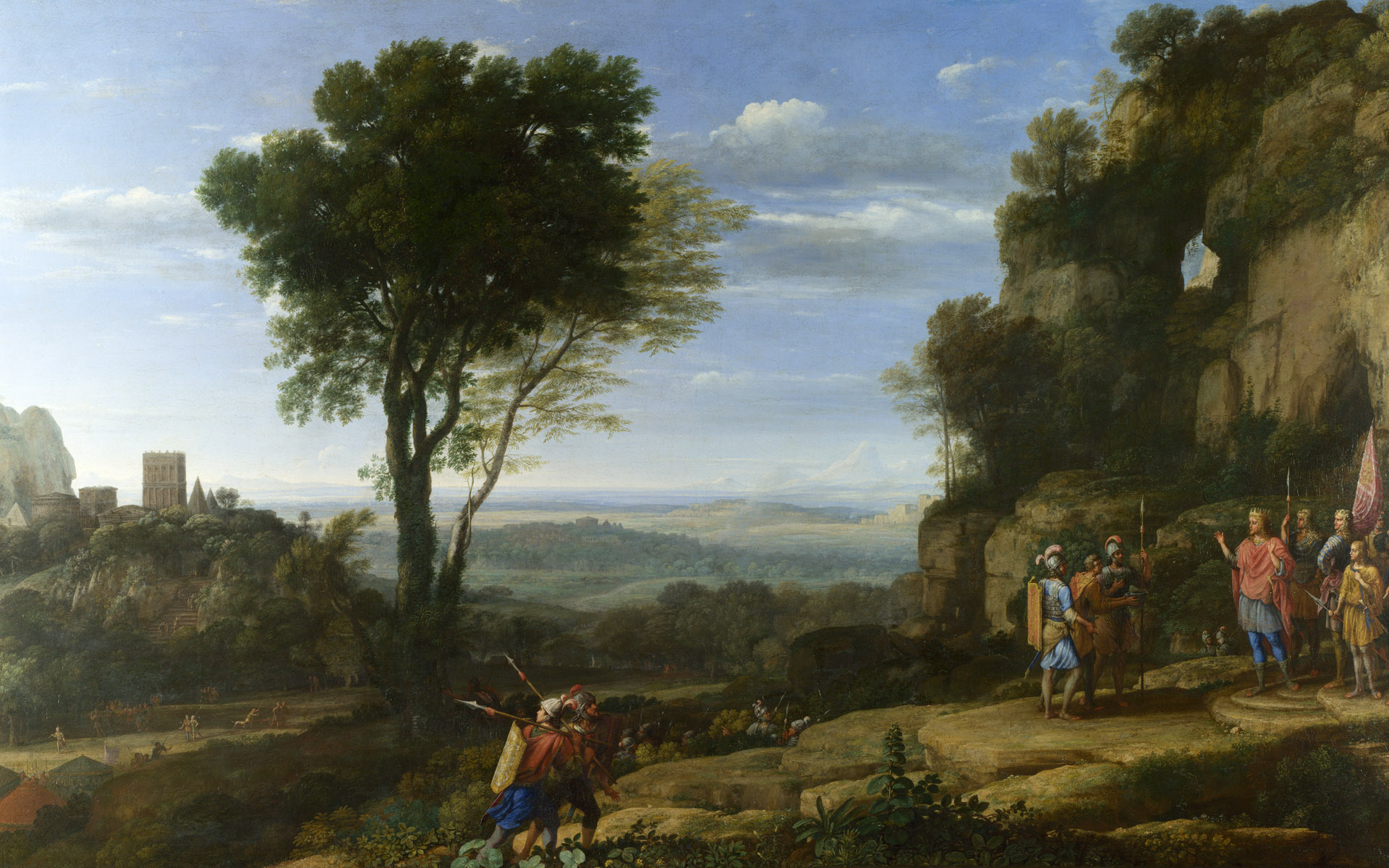
Claude Lorrain, Landscape with David at the Cave of Adullam

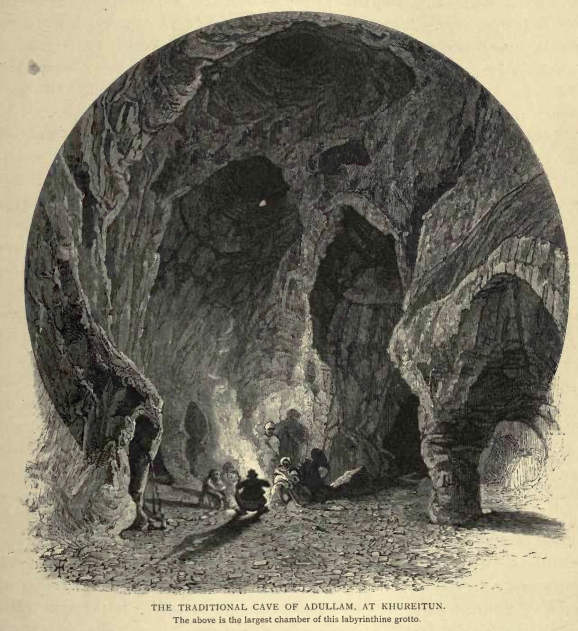
Cave of Adullam, 1880

The Cave of Adullam (Hebrew: מערת עדלם, romanized: mə‘āraṯ ‘Ǎḏullām) was originally a stronghold referred to in the Old Testament, near the town of Adullam, where future King David sought refuge from King Saul.

The word "cave" is usually used but "fortress", which has a similar appearance in writing, is used as well. Wilhelm Gesenius' work Hebrew and Chaldee Lexicon to the Old Testament Scriptures provides notes supporting Adullam as meaning "a hiding place". Brown, Driver, and Briggs' Hebrew and English Lexicon of the Old Testament cite the Arabic word 'adula to mean "turn aside" and suggest Adullam to mean "retreat, refuge".

During this period, David passed up several opportunities to kill Saul, who in turn was attempting to kill his young rival, whose followers believed had been chosen by God to succeed King Saul. David refused to fight unethically, for instance when he had an opportunity to kill Saul in his sleep. According to the Old Testament, God honored David's high ethical standards and soon King David and his men, who had once hidden in the Cave of Adullam, were known throughout Israel for their deeds of valor.

== Non-biblical usage ==
The term "Cave of Adullam" has been used by political commentators to refer to any small group removed from power but planning to return. Thus in Walter Scott's 1814 novel Waverley, when the Jacobite rising of 1745 marches south through England, the Jacobite Baron of Bradwardine welcomes scanty recruits while remarking that they closely resemble David's followers at the Cave of Adullam; "videlicet, every one that was in distress, and every one that was in debt, and every one that was discontented".

A short-lived anti-reform faction within the UK Liberal Party in 1866 was dubbed the Adullamites by fellow Liberal John Bright.

== See also ==
- Psalm 142, "a prayer when he (David) was in the cave".
