= Wise Woman =

Wise Woman usually refers, often in the context of pre-modern European peasantry, to:

- Folk healer (also called cunning folk)
- Midwife

Wise Woman may also refer to:

== Ethnographic examples ==
- Wise woman among the Sami

== Individuals ==
- Gouyen, Apache for "wise woman", a 19th-century Native American figure
- Agnes Sampson, known as the Wise Wife of Keith, involved in the North Berwick Witch Trials

== In fiction ==
- A character in fantasy series The Wheel of Time

== Other uses ==
- One of the cunning folk
- A type of white witch
- Wise Old Man and Wise Old Woman, a Jungian archetype
- Crone, a literary archetype

== See also ==
- The Lost Princess (1875), a fairy tale novel by George MacDonald, first published as The Wise Woman: A Parable
- The Wise Woman of Hoxton, a 17th-century play
- Wise woman of Abel, an unnamed figure in the Hebrew Bible
- Woman of Tekoa, also called a wise woman in the Hebrew Bible
