= Abel-beth-maachah =

Ruin with the remains of biblical town in northern Israel

Tel Abel Beth Maacah
- תֵּל אָבֵל בֵּית מַעֲכָה (Hebrew)
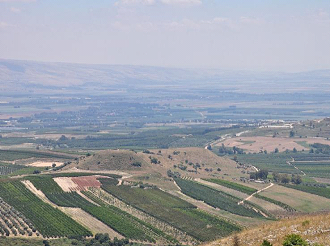
- Tel Abel Beth Maacah seen from the north-west in 2016

- Location within Israel
- 33.257°N 35.580°E
- Type: tell
- Periods: Bronze Age, Iron Age, Persian, Hellenistic, Byzantine, Early Islamic, Crusader, Mamluk and Ottoman periods
- Cultures: Canaan, Israelite
- Location: Near Metula, Israel
- Region: Upper Galilee

Site notes
- Excavation dates: 2013–
- Archaeologists: Nava Panitz-Cohen, Robert A. Mullins, Ruhama Bonfil
- Condition: in ruins
- Public access: yes
- Website: Tel Abel Beth Maacah Excavations website

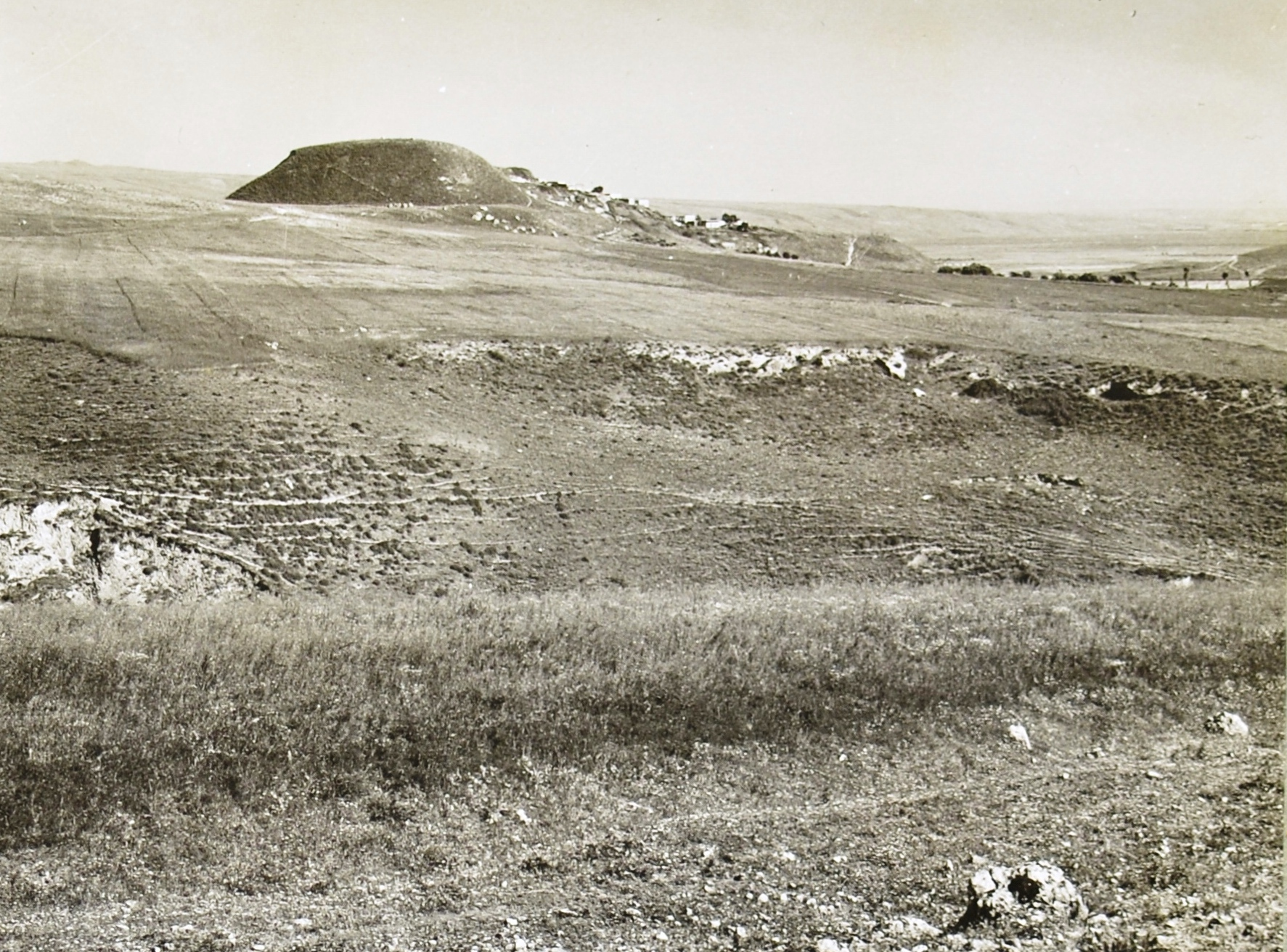
Tel Abel Beth Maacah, picture taken from the road in 1945

Tel Abel Beth Maacah (Hebrew: תל אבל בית מעכה; Arabic: تل آبل القامع, romanized: Tell Abil el-Qameḥ) is a large archaeological tell with a small upper northern section and a large lower southern one, connected by a saddle. It is located on the northern border of present-day Israel, about 2 kilometres (1.2 mi) south of the town of Metula and about 6.5 kilometres (4.0 mi) west of Tel Dan.

The survey and excavations conducted in recent years have shown that the site had been inhabited during the Bronze and Iron Ages, as well as the Achaemenid, Hellenistic, Byzantine, Early Islamic, Crusader, Mamluk and Ottoman periods. Since at least the early 13th century CE the mound was the location of the Arab village of Abil al-Qamh, depopulated in 1948. However, the lower mound was not occupied after the Iron Age I (late 11th/early 10th centuries BCE), when occupation seems to have concentrated on the upper mound.

The site was fortified with walls and a rampart during the Middle Bronze Age II. These fortifications were reused in the Late Bronze Age in the south of the mound, but were abandoned in Iron Age I. A silver hoard in a jug, dating to the end of the Late Bronze Age, is one of the earliest such hoards found in the country. The Iron Age I sequence is among the densest in this region and includes strata of cultic, domestic, and public character. Traces of metal-working were found in the latter. The Iron Age II is represented by a large stone wall within the upper mound, which may be part of a citadel. A well-built structure dating to the Persian-early Hellenistic period was built above this wall, and other Iron Age remains.

In the later periods, the Palestinians village of Abil al-Qamh was located here until it was depopulated during the Nakba in 1948.

== The site ==
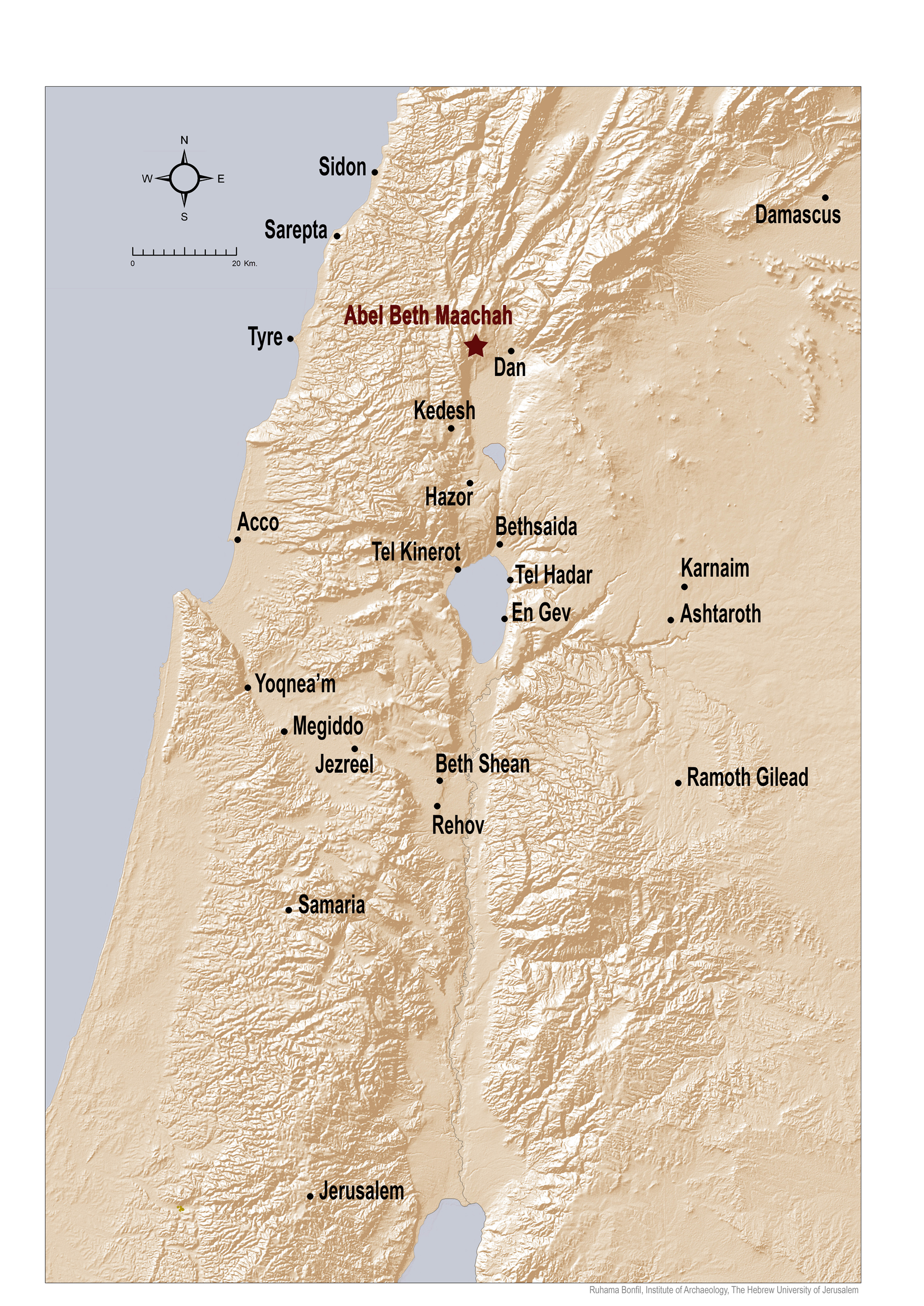

The site is approximately 100 dunams (10 hectares) in size and sits astride the narrow defile of Nahal Ayun, one of the four headwaters of the Jordan River. The Tanur Waterfall, fed by the Iyyon, is located just north of the site. From its strategic vantage point overlooking the narrow northern end of the fertile Hula Valley, the site commands roads leading north to the Lebanese Beqaa Valley, northeast to inland Syria (Damascus) and Mesopotamia, and west to the Lebanese/Phoenician coast.

The tell is identified with Abel Beth-Maacah mentioned in the Hebrew Bible and consists of an upper mound in the north and a larger lower mound in the south, with a moderately high saddle between them.

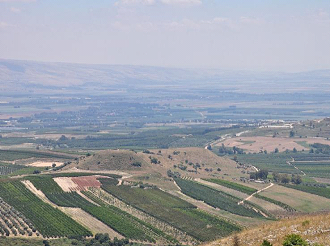
View of Tel Abel Beth Maacah, looking southeast

The location of the town in such a strategic spot points to it having played a major role in the interaction between the various national groups and political powers in the Bronze Age (Canaanites, Hurrians/Mitannians, Egyptians, and Hittites) and the Iron Age (Israelites, Arameans and Phoenicians). Abel Beth Maacah was a border town, and as such, was exposed to these influences at the same time that it fulfilled the role of buffering, or bearing the brunt of, foreign invasions. Its proximity to numerous water sources and a rich agricultural hinterland was yet another factor in making Abel Beth Maacah a large and prominent site in antiquity.

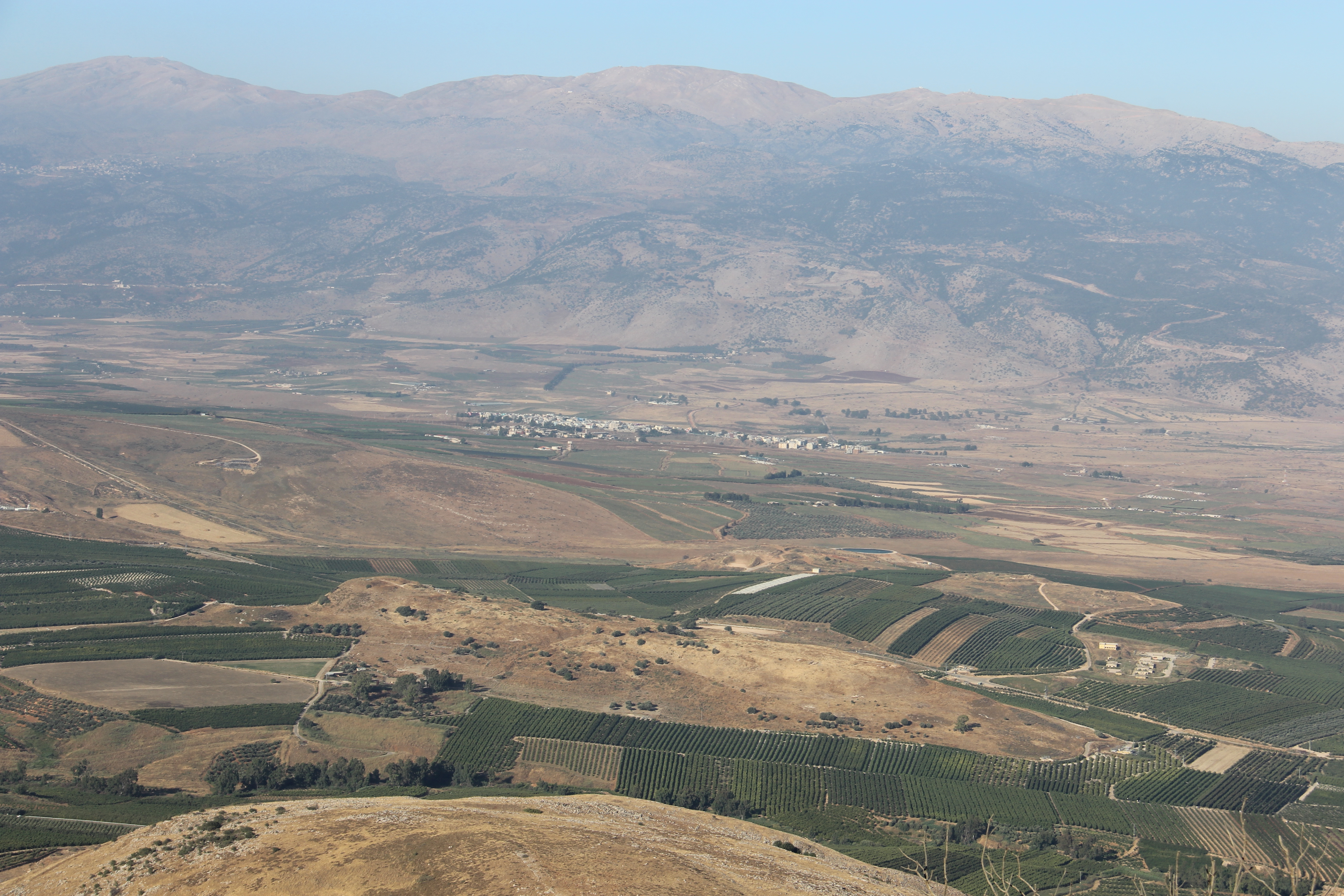
View of Tel Abel Beth Maacah (center of photo), looking east, with the Hermon massif in the background

== Etymology ==
Abel Beth Maacah means "the meadow of the house of Maacah". The biblical name is spelled as Abel-beth-maacah, Abel Beth Maacah, Abel Beth-Maacah, or Avel Bet Ma'akha, with many variations. The city is also called Abel Maim ("meadow of water") in 2 Chronicles 16:4, or Abel Mayim (אַבֵל מַיִם) ("Abel of the waters" or "Abel of waters") in Hebrew (from (אָבֵל - Mourning) and (מַיִם - water)).

Toponymic evidence supports long-term continuity at Abel-beth-maachah, beyond the biblical and classical antiquity periods. The ancient name is preserved in the Arabic toponym Abil al-Qamḥ, attested in Ottoman-period tax registers and later cartographic sources, reflecting phonetic and semantic adaptation rather than replacement. The name's longevity indicates that the site remained embedded in the regional naming landscape of the northern Hula Valley into the early modern period, challenging earlier assumptions that its ancient name had been lost following Late Antiquity.

== Identification ==
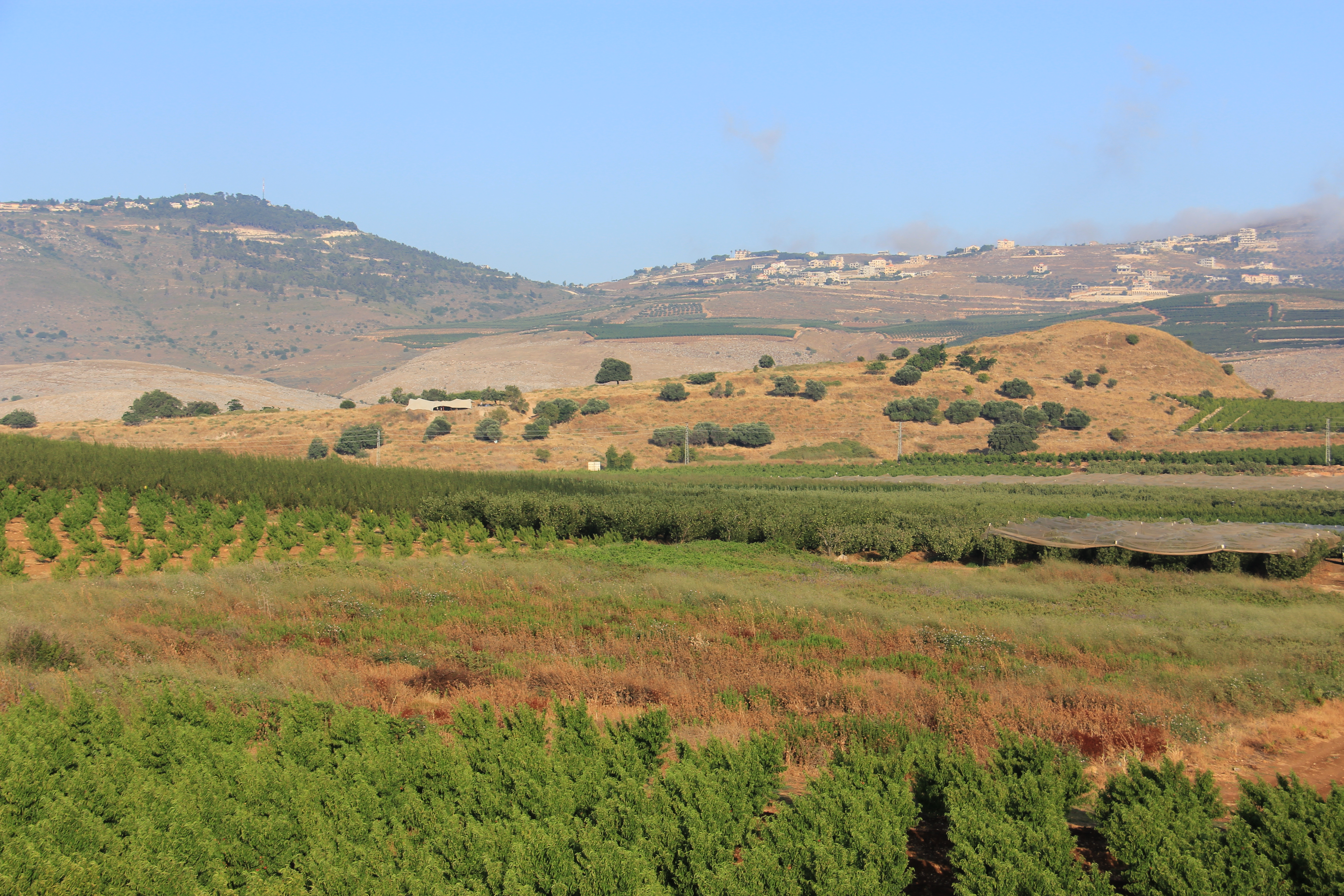
Tel Abel Beth Maacah – view of the northern part of the tell from the east; the Lebanese village of Adaisse in the background

The tell was described by a number of prominent 19th-century and early 20th-century explorers, including Victor Guérin, Félix-Marie Abel and Edward Robinson, who was the first to identify the mound with biblical Abel Beth Maacah (Avel Bet Ma^{c}akha). The proposal has won scholarly acceptance, based largely on historical-geographical considerations.

The identification is based mainly on the appearance of the town in two geographic lists in the Bible. In 1 Kings 15:20, the Aramean king Ben-Hadad I was solicited in the 9th century BCE by King Asa of Judah to attack the northern kingdom. He did successfully, although apparently soon after this, control over this region returned to Israelite hands during the reign of Ahab. "Ben-hadad listened to King Asa, and sent the commanders of his armies against the cities of Israel. He conquered Ijon, Tel Dan, Abel-beth-maacah, and all Chinneroth, with all the land of Naphtali". A similar geographic list is noted in the story of the Assyrian conquest of the region in the late 8th century BCE in 2 Kings 15:29: "In the days of King Pekah of Israel, King Tiglath-pileser of Assyria came and captured Ijon, Abel-beth-maacah, Janoah, Kedesh, Hazor, Gilead, and Galilee, all the land of Naphtali; and carried the people captive to Assyria".

== Second millennium BCE and biblical references ==
A Hebrew inscription on the lid of a wine storage jar uncovered in the summer of 2019 reads “leBenayau,” meaning that the storage jar and its contents “belong to Benayau” is dated to the 10th-9th century BCE. It was found together with other jars in what appears to have been the wine cellar of a man named Benayau. It is the first inscription found at the dig, and the lettering dates it to earlier than 2,900 years ago. The inscription is one of several artifacts that appear to support the idea first proposed by Avraham Biran that Abel-beth-maachah was an Israelite town during the reigns of David and Solomon.

Bronze Age references to the site include the early group of the Execration Texts (Middle Bronze IIA) and possibly Thutmose III's list of destroyed towns (Late Bronze I), as well as the Amarna letters (Late Bronze IIA; Dever 1984: 211–213). After the Assyrian conquest, the site is not mentioned in any later sources.

Aside from the two geographic lists quoted above in relation to the conquest of the town by the Arameans and the Assyrians, the site is mentioned one other time in the Bible: 2 Samuel 20:14–22, which relates a call for revolt against David by a Benjaminite named Sheba ben Bichri. Sheba fled to Abel Beth Maacah, pursued by Joab and his army. Setting up a siege at the town, Joab threatened to destroy it, when the local "wise woman" (possibly an oracle) informed him that the city was loyal to David, calling it "a city and a mother in Israel" (2 Samuel 20:19) and arranged to have the rebel who took refuge there beheaded, and thus saving her town. This is the only time the phrase "a city and a mother in Israel" is mentioned in the Bible and might allude to its particular political and/or religious status. This narrative also emphasizes the town as the northernmost point of the Israelite state entity, although it is not clear to which time period this relates, since this narrative most likely reflects a time later in Iron Age II than the reign of David.

Though speculative, some scholars have suggested that the conquest of Abel Beth Maacah by Ben-hadad I may be alluded to in the second line of the 'House of David' inscription found at nearby Tel Dan, where the letters aleph and bet have survived and might be the beginning of the name of the town "Abel" (Schneidewind 1996:77; Naaman 2012:95, note 10).

== Exploration history ==
=== Past explorations ===
Despite its obvious historical importance and geographic prominence, Abel Beth Maacah had not been excavated prior to 2012. Previous study of the site involved periodic visits by representatives of the British Mandatory Department of Antiquities and limited surveys carried out by the Israel Department of Antiquities in the 1950s, by Yehudah Dayan in the 1960s, and by Prof. William G. Dever of the University of Arizona in 1972, who summarily published the results, along with a detailed historical-geographical analysis (Dever 1986). Subsequently, a small salvage excavation conducted by the Israel Antiquities Authority (IAA) at the base of the southeastern slope revealed several Byzantine tombs, as well as a group of Middle Bronze IIB vessels that seemed typical of a tomb assemblage, although no tomb from this period was found (Stepansky 2005).

=== Current project ===
The excavation of Tel Abel Beth Maacah has been initiated and funded by Azusa Pacific University of Los Angeles, and is conducted as a joint project with the Hebrew University of Jerusalem, co-directed by Dr. Robert Mullins of the former institution and Dr. Naama Yahalom-Mack and Dr. Nava Panitz-Cohen of the latter. The surveyor and stratigraphic advisor is Ruhama Bonfil of the Hebrew University of Jerusalem.

The project began in 2012 with a survey followed by four excavation seasons to date (2013–2016).

==== 2012 survey; habitation periods ====
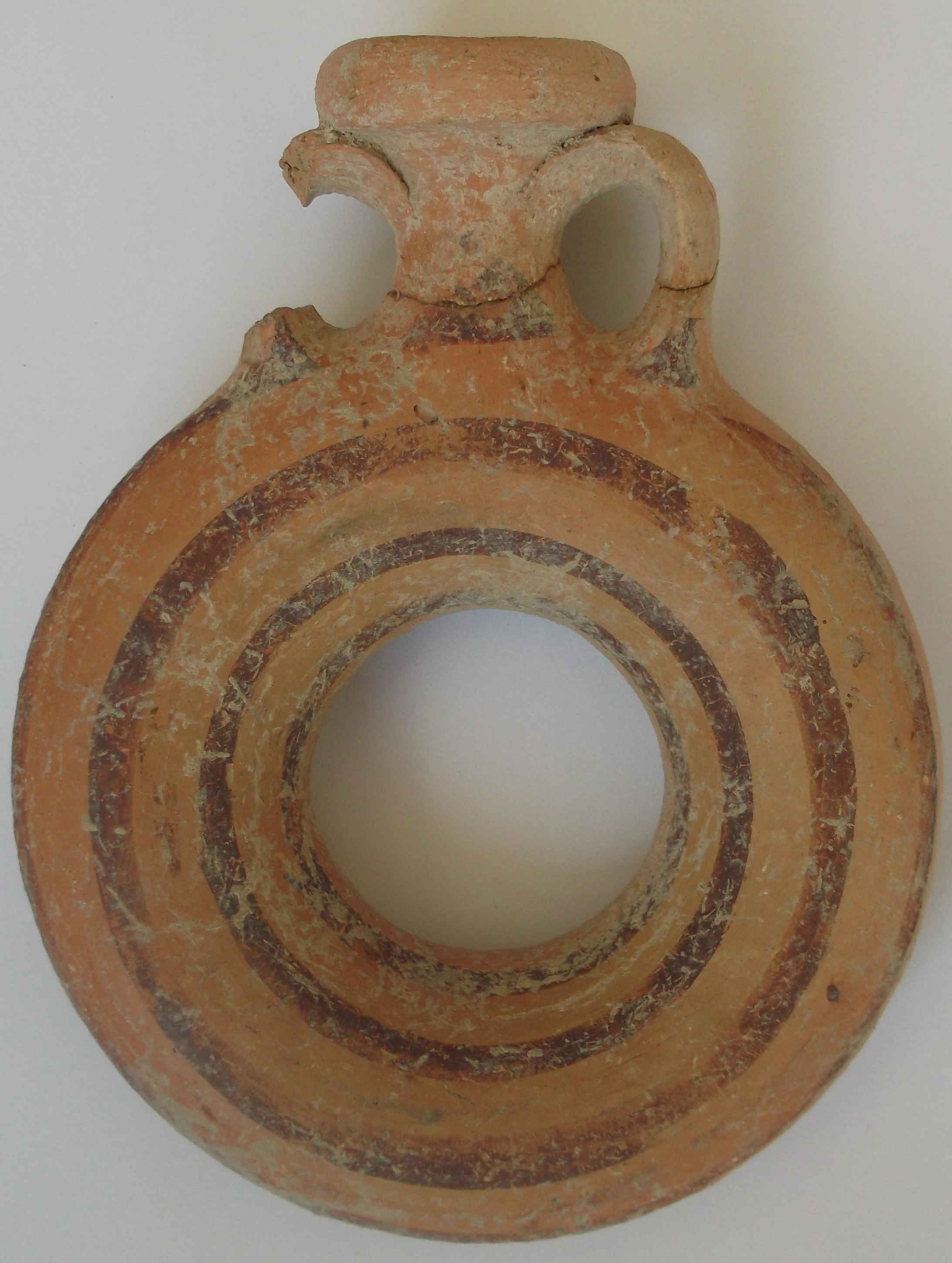
The ring flask from Area A (survey)

In May 2012, a four-day survey was conducted, combining an extensive walking survey with limited shallow (up to 10 cm) excavation in six areas spread around the site. The survey showed that there was occupation in the Early Bronze [EB] II-III, Middle Bronze [MB] II, Late Bronze [LB]I-II, Iron Age I-II, Persian, Hellenistic, Byzantine, Early Islamic, Crusader, Mamluk and Ottoman periods. The survey also revealed that the lower part of the tell in the south has an outcropping of bedrock running through much of its center, indicating that the ancient remains in this part of the site should be sought around its perimeter.

An intact ring flask, apparently of Late Bronze Age date, was found in the survey in the vicinity of Area A.

== Excavation and findings ==
=== Excavation areas ===
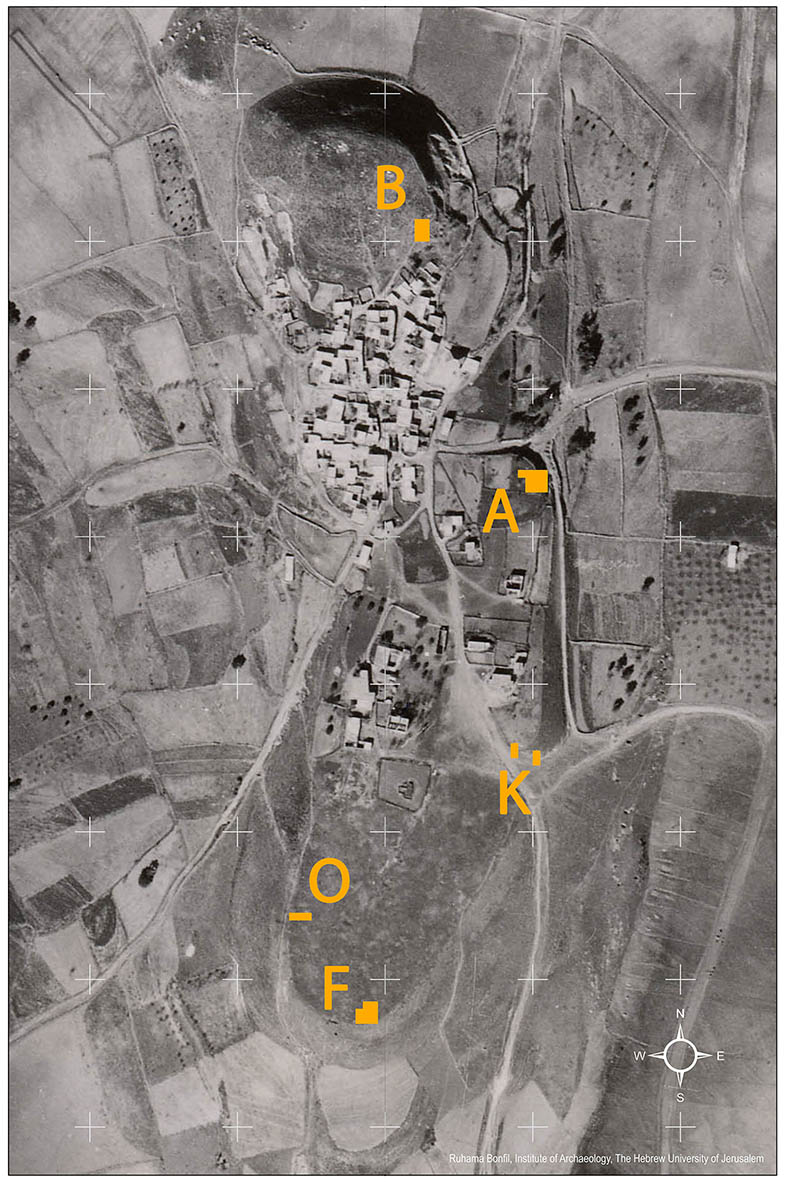
The Arab village of Abil el-Qameḥ on 1945 aerial photo, with current excavation areas marked on it

Five areas had been excavated as of Winter 2021. Area A on the eastern slope of the middle saddle (remains of Middle Bronze IIB, Late Bronze IIB, Iron Age I, Iron Age II and Early Islamic), Area B on the eastern slope of the upper mound (remains of Middle Bronze IIB, Iron Age I, Iron Age II, Persian-early Hellenistic, Roman-Byzantine, Mamluk), Area F on the southern end of the lower mound (remains of MBIIB, LB I-II, Iron I), Area O on the western edge of the lower mound (remains of MBIIB, Iron I-II), and Area K on the eastern slope of a topographical depression between the lower and upper mounds (remains of Iron I-II). In wake of the survey and excavations to date, it was found that the lower mound was probably not occupied after the Iron Age I (late 11th/early 10th century BCE) and occupation was limited to the upper mound and the interim saddle.

Excavation areas are marked on this 1945 aerial photo of the tell (Aerial Photographic Archive, Geography Department, Hebrew University of Jerusalem, taken by the Royal Air Force, Section 23, 1945); the houses visible on the photo belong to the Arab village of Abil al-Qamh.

=== Middle Bronze II ===
Remains of the Middle Bronze II have been revealed to date in three areas: F, O and B.

==== Area F ====
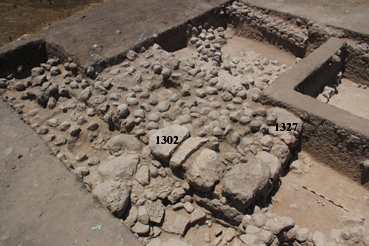
View of the tower, with its northeastern corner of large boulders and the layers of small stones, looking southwest

A large structure was revealed just under topsoil. Its southern end continues down the slope and its western end was cut by later activity. This feature is composed of an outer 'lining' of very large, roughly worked stones in its northeastern corner and northern wall, which enclosed layers of small-medium roughly rounded stones.

Adjoining the eastern face of the stones is a rampart, partly capped by stones and composed of layers of chalky white material and dark brown soil, of which only the top has so far been excavated. The stone structure and rampart are part of a fortification placed on the southern end of the site, overlooking the Huleh Valley and the main north–south road that passed alongside it on the west.

The exact date of the tower and rampart cannot yet be determined, as no floors associated with them have been revealed to date. Against the northern face of the fortification are elements dating to the Late Bronze Age I-II, so that it the fortification should most likely be dated to the Middle Bronze II, though a more precise chronology cannot be fixed yet.

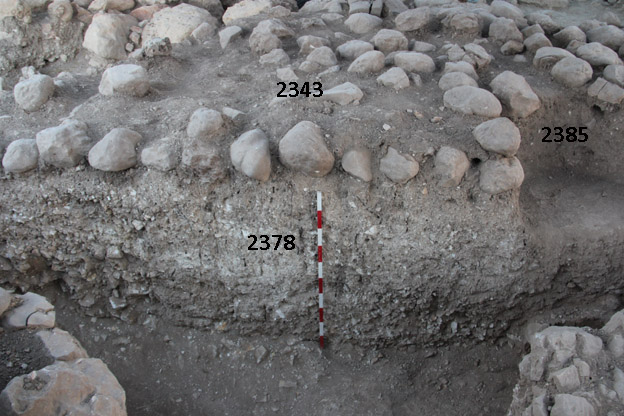
The rampart layers, capped by small-medium stones, looking north; Iron I pits and stone silos cut into the layers

==== Area O ====
One, and possibly two strata, dated to the Middle Bronze IIB, were exposed underneath an eroded Late Bronze Age phase below topsoil.

The Middle Bronze Age remains consist a building with four consecutive rooms revealed to date, with entrances in two of them, showing that the rooms were part of one building that continues to the north. Traces of a violent end to this occupation were identified. The pottery can be dated to Middle Bronze IIB and included storage jars (some with baby burials) and pithoi. In the northeastern corner of the area, the skeleton of a large male was found lying on its stomach and partly covered by a pithos.

The lowest phase exposed consists of the top of a layer of stones on the western edge of the mound that might be part of an Early Bronze wall, judging by the pottery collected nearby.

==== Area B ====
Underneath remains dating to Iron Age I and IIA, a large rampart composed mainly of diagonal gravelly layers was revealed. An MBIIC grave that contained a Hyksos scarab was cut into this rampart and thus, it is tentatively dated to MBIIB. This rampart shows that the upper mound in the north was occupied and fortified during the Middle Bronze Age IIB, although the nature and direction of the rampart here is different from that found in the lower mound in the south (Areas F and possibly, K).

=== Late Bronze Age ===
Remains of the Late Bronze Age were revealed in Areas F, O and A.

==== Area F ====
Three architectural strata, debris layers, and floors from the Late Bronze Age were revealed, abutting the northern face of the MBII fortification. The incorporation of the fortification as part of the LB buildings indicates that it was still in use during this period. The earliest LB stratum, built on top of what seems to be the foundation of the tower, includes two nicely built north–south walls; an earthen layer (floor?) with a well-built oven was found to the west of these walls; the pottery points to an LB I date. The third and latest LB stratum contained several walls (cut by Iron Age I silos and pits). On its earthen floor was a concentration of pottery and a small jug (a local imitation of a Cypriot bilbil) that contained a silver hoard. The 12 pieces found inside included earrings, an ingot, and hacksilver.

The latest LB layer in Area F can be dated to LBIIB (13th century BCE) and the remains exposed so far indicate that it did not end in a destruction, but was peacefully abandoned. These remains were later built over by an Iron I building and cut by Iron I silos and pits.

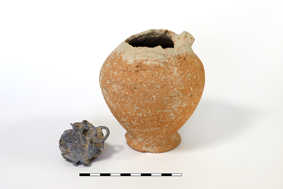
The jug with the silver hoard, as found (photo by Gabi Laron

==== Area O ====
Remains uncovered just below topsoil in Area O are attributed to the Late Bronze Age, since they rested on top of a building attributed to MBIIB and on the basis of the small amount of pottery found associated with them.

==== Area A ====
The lowest level reached in Area A included several large walls, built of stone and brick, with associated Late Bronze pottery. The Iron I walls were built directly over them, with no trace of destruction of the LB elements.

=== Iron Age I ===
Remains of Iron Age I have been revealed mainly in Area A on the eastern edge of the saddle between the lower and upper mounds, where five strata belonging to this period have been excavated, as well as in Area F. In both areas, the pottery included many collared-rim jars, wavy band pithoi, small hemispherical bowls, a variety of vertical cooking pot rims, pyxides, painted carinated kraters, and pear-shaped jugs.

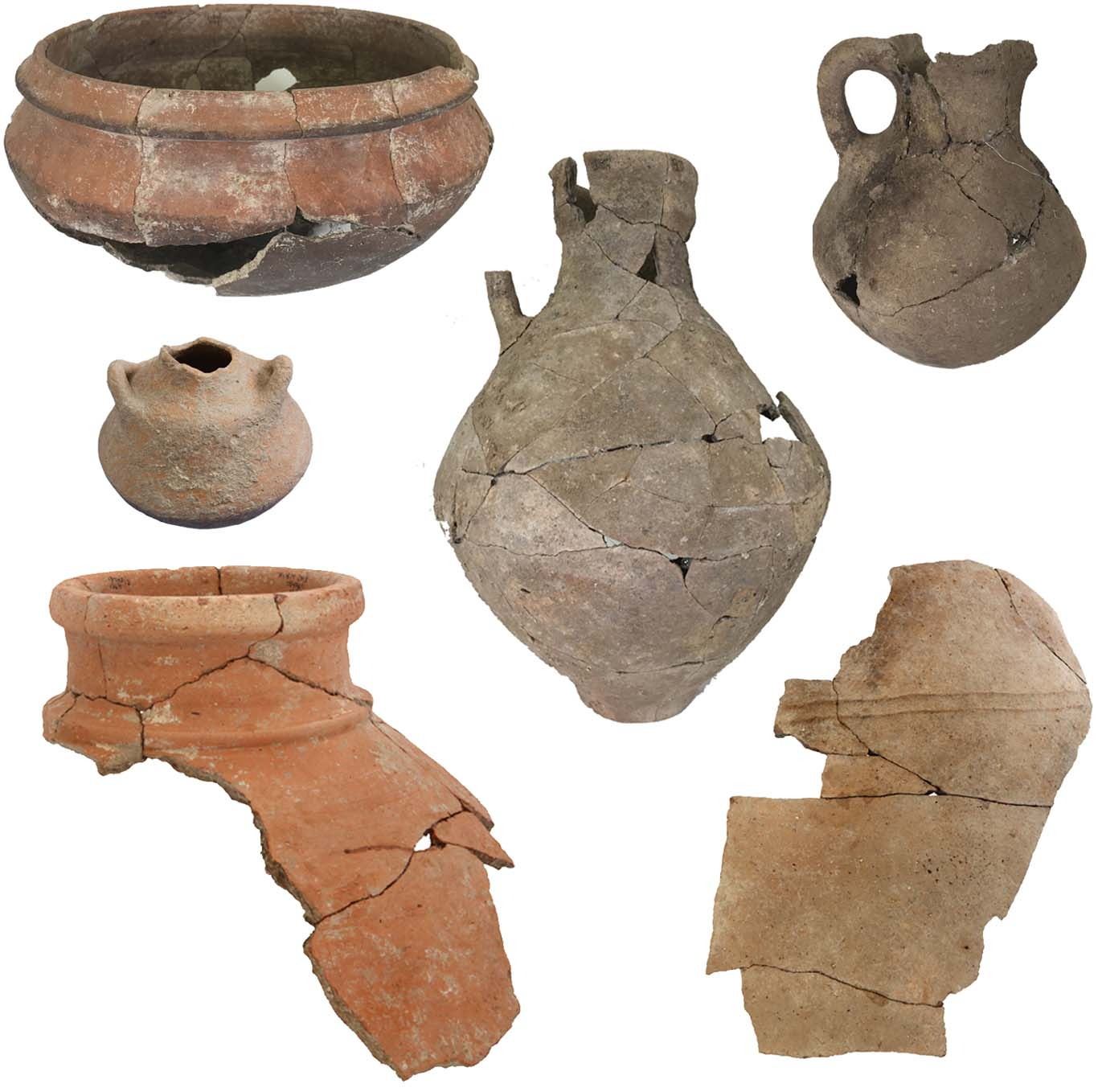
Selection of Iron I pottery forms, Areas A and F

==== Area F ====
Remains of the Iron Age I were found just above the latest Late Bronze Age layer (dated to the 13th century BCE, LBIIB). These remains included a building with several rooms, as well numerous pits and silos. Some of these were cut into the LB walls, as well as into the top of the MBII fortification, indicating that the latter went out of use in this period. The pits contained pottery, a spindle whorl and an iron blade. One of these pits, cut deep against the wall of the MBII tower, contained a concentration of discarded cultic vessels. These remains were exposed just below topsoil. Aside from a large pit dug in the Persian period here, no later occupation was identified following the Iron Age I here.

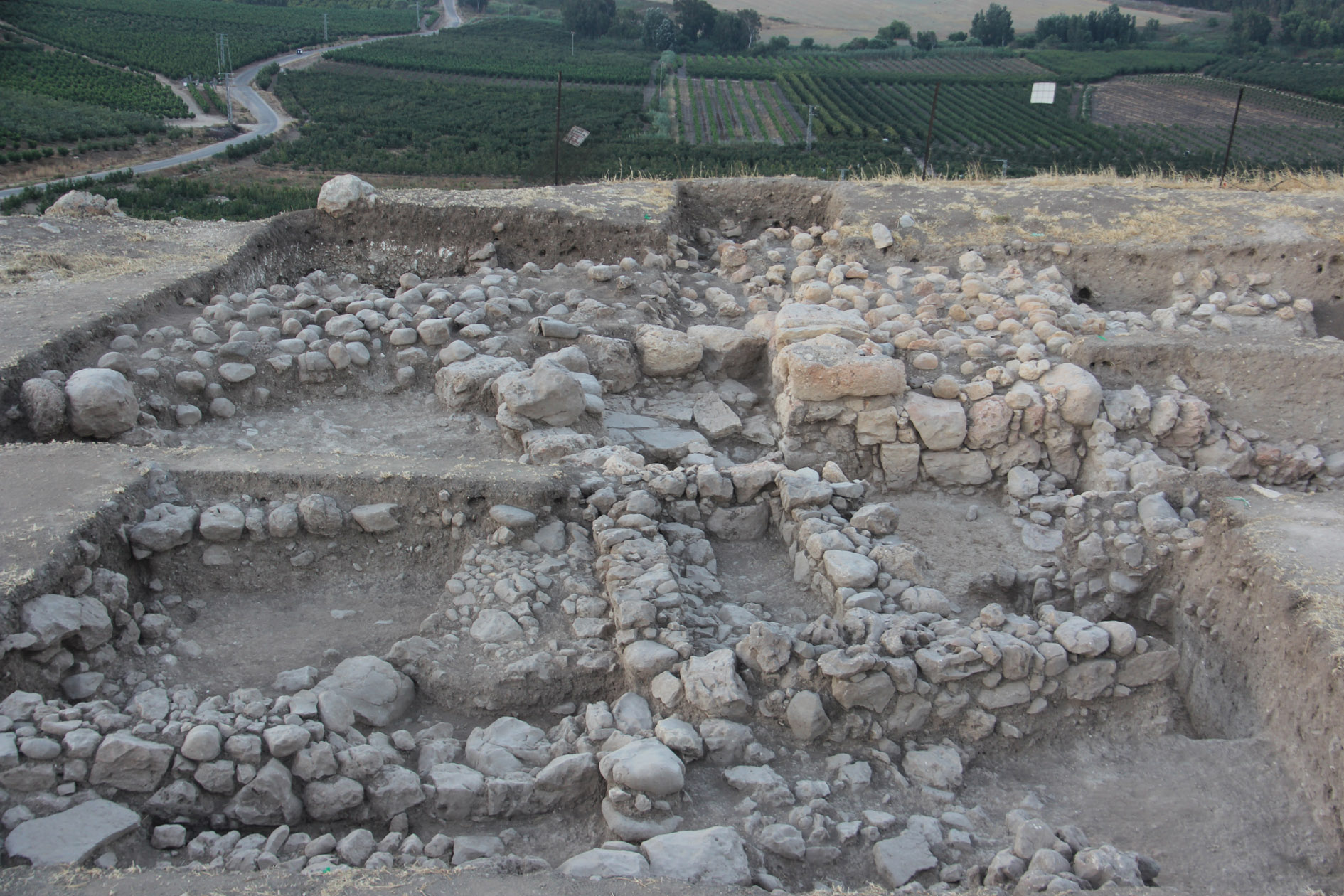
Iron I building in foreground-MBII tower and rampart in background; looking south

==== Area A ====
Four strata are attributed to Iron Age I in Area A. This is one of the densest stratigraphic sequences attributed to this period in this region. Above the uppermost Iron I stratum were several flimsy modern agricultural terrace walls, but no ancient remains later than the end of Iron I (late 11th/early 10th centuries BCE).

The earliest stratum revealed to date appears in a few probes and contains several well-built stone walls and related debris layers with stone collapse and much pottery. The stratum above this has a structure apparently of a cultic nature, with various installations, such as a pit with animal bones, massebot (standing stones), a small bamah (altar). This occupation was violently destroyed, leaving large amounts of pottery, including collar-rim jars, pyxides, carinated jugs and kraters. On the floor of one of the rooms were several jewelry items, including an amethyst scarab set in a gold ring that belongs to the time of the Egyptian Middle Kingdom. Replacing the destroyed cultic(?) area was a layer of domestic nature, with many ovens and earthen floors. Directly above this, a very finely constructed complex was built, comprising a courtyard-like building on the east, a building complex on the west with a large open space on the south and room(s) on the north. A wide passageway runs between them. The external walls of the buildings facing the passageway are lined with stone buttresses.

In the western hall/courtyard, a complete pot bellows was revealed in secondary use, with traces of bronze and iron working inside; an almost complete tuyere was found nearby. It seems that there was some metallurgical activity in this area, similar to that at nearby Tel Dan in Strata VI and V (and possibly IV).

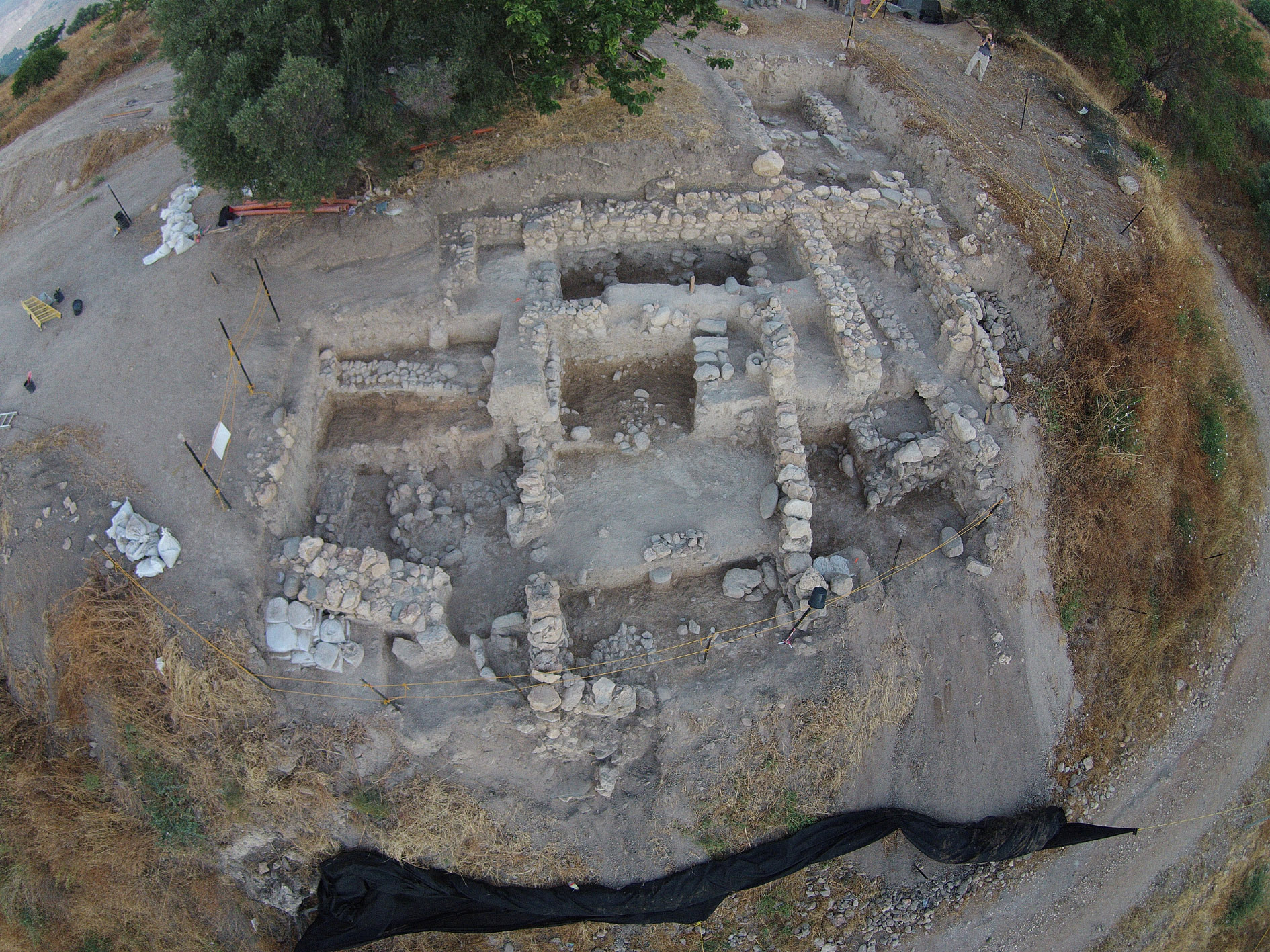
Aerial view of Area A, end of 2015 excavation season, looking west

==== Iron Age I, II and Persian–Early Hellenistic period in Area B ====
A large well-built stone building with three phases and dating to the Persian-early Hellenistic period was exposed in Area B. Below this building are architectural remains and numerous pits attributed to Iron Age I, including a floor with vessels and traces of destruction. Cutting this activity is a massive east–west stone wall that was partly covered by the Persian-early Hellenistic building and thus, it is presently attributed to Iron Age IIB. No floors associated with it have yet been excavated and it seems that it might be part of a citadel at this high point of the mound. Two large stone-lined silos were also attributed to Iron IIB; they contained much Iron II pottery, including red-slipped and hand burnished sherds, as well as the head of a Phoenician-style figurine.

The Iron I and II architecture and pits cut into and are built on the sloping layers of the Middle Bronze II rampart described above.

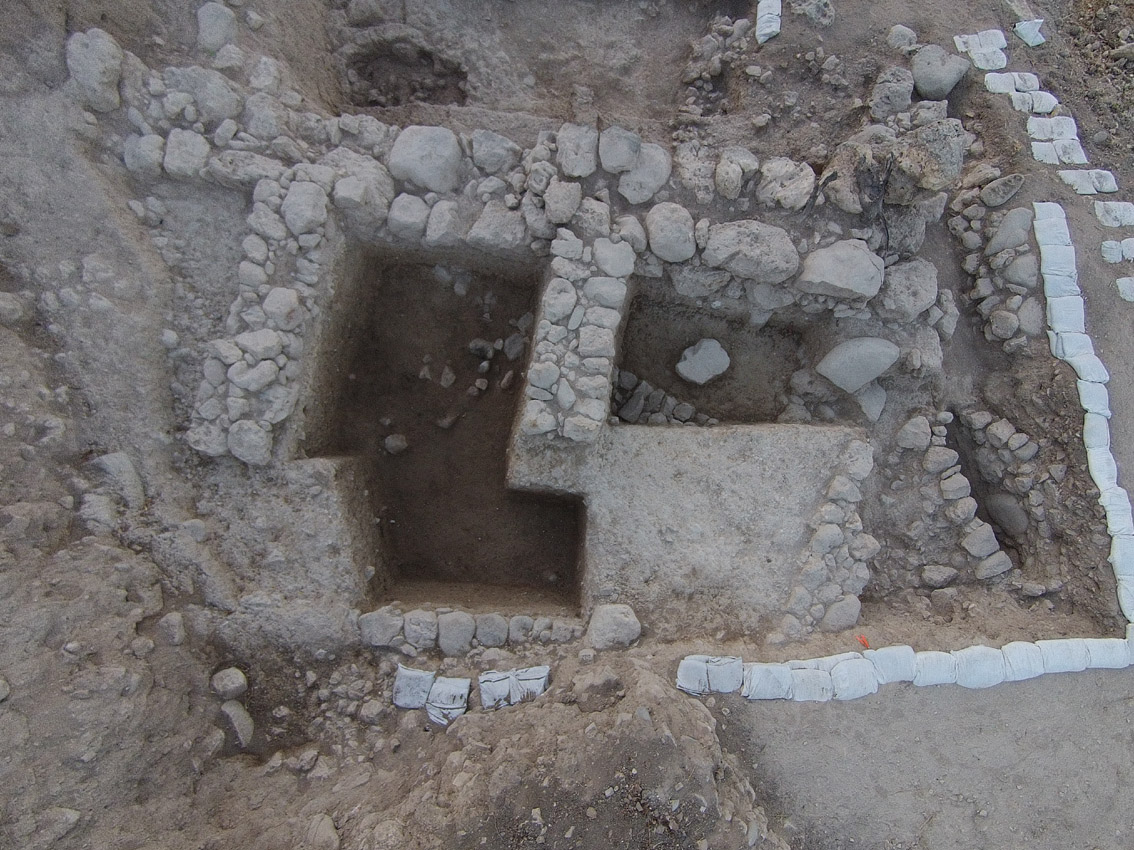
Persian–Early Hellenistic stone building above Iron Age II remains

==== Area K fortifications ====
Located on the eastern slope of the northern end of the lower mound, in a spot whose moderate topography suggests the possibility of a gate here, a north–south stone wall was revealed, ca. 4 m wide and abutted partially on its south side by a white chalky layer. This might represent a fortification system, although no date is possible at this point.

=== Field reports ===
Field reports and additional references are posted online.

=== Significant discoveries ===
In 2018, archaeologists led by Robert Mullins from the Azusa Pacific University announced the discovery of a 2,800-year-old carved head sculpture of a man. The well-crafted figurine was described with long, black hair, a beard and a painted headband. He also had almond-shaped eyes and a serious expression on his face. According to archeologists, the measurements of carved in a glazed ceramic called faience were approximately 2.2 × 2 inches, and the head was once part of a small figurine, now lost that was 8 to 10 inches. The sculpture is on display at the Israel Museum in Jerusalem.

In 2025, a Diocletian basalt boundary stone inscribed with the names of the Tetrarchs was discovered at the site, reused in a later Mamluk-period grave covering; the inscription also preserves the names of two villages, Tirthas and Golgol, otherwise unattested in historical sources.

== Bibliography ==
- Abel, F.M. (1938). Géographie de la Palestine. Études bibliques (in French). Vol. 2. Paris: Gabalda.
- Dever, William G. 1986. Abel-beth-Maacah: Northern Gateway of Ancient Israel. pp. 207–223. In L.T. Geraty and L.G. Herr (eds.). The Archaeology of Jordan and Other Studies. Presented to Siegfried H. Horn. Berrien Springs, MI: Andrews University Press.
- Mazar, B. (1958–59). "Geshur and Ma'cah". Zion (in Hebrew). 23–24 (3–4). Historical Society of Israel. JSTOR 23549221.
- Na'aman, Nadav 2012. The Kingdom of Geshur in History and Memory. Scandinavian Journal of the Old Testament: An International Journal of Nordic Theology 26:1: 88–101.
- Panitz-Cohen, Nava; Mullins, Robert A. and Bonfil, Ruhama 2013. Northern Exposure: Launching Excavations at Tell Abil el-Qameḥ (Tel Abel Beth Maacah). Strata 31: 27–42.
- Panitz-Cohen, Nava; Mullins, Robert A. and Bonfil, Ruhama 2016. Second Preliminary Report of the Excavations at Tell Abil el Qameḥ (Abel Beth Maacah). Strata 33: 35–59.
- Panitz-Cohen, Nava; Yahalom-Mack, Naama 2022. Tel Avel Bet Ma‘akha (Abel Beth Maacah) – 2018–2021. Hadashot Archaeologiot Journal, vol. 134.
- Schneidewind, William M. 1996. Tel Dan Stela – New Light on Aramaic and Jehu's Revolt. Bulletin of the American Schools of Oriental Research 302: 75–90.
- Stepansky, Yosef, (2005). Tel Avel Bet Ma'akha. Hadashot Archaeologiot Journal, vol. 117. IAA report on 2000 discovery of Middle Bronze II burial remains at southeastern foot of the lower mound.
