= Yuval =

Place in Northern Israel

Yuval: יובל (Hebrew)
- Moshav

Hebrew transcription(s)
  - Official: Kfar Yuval
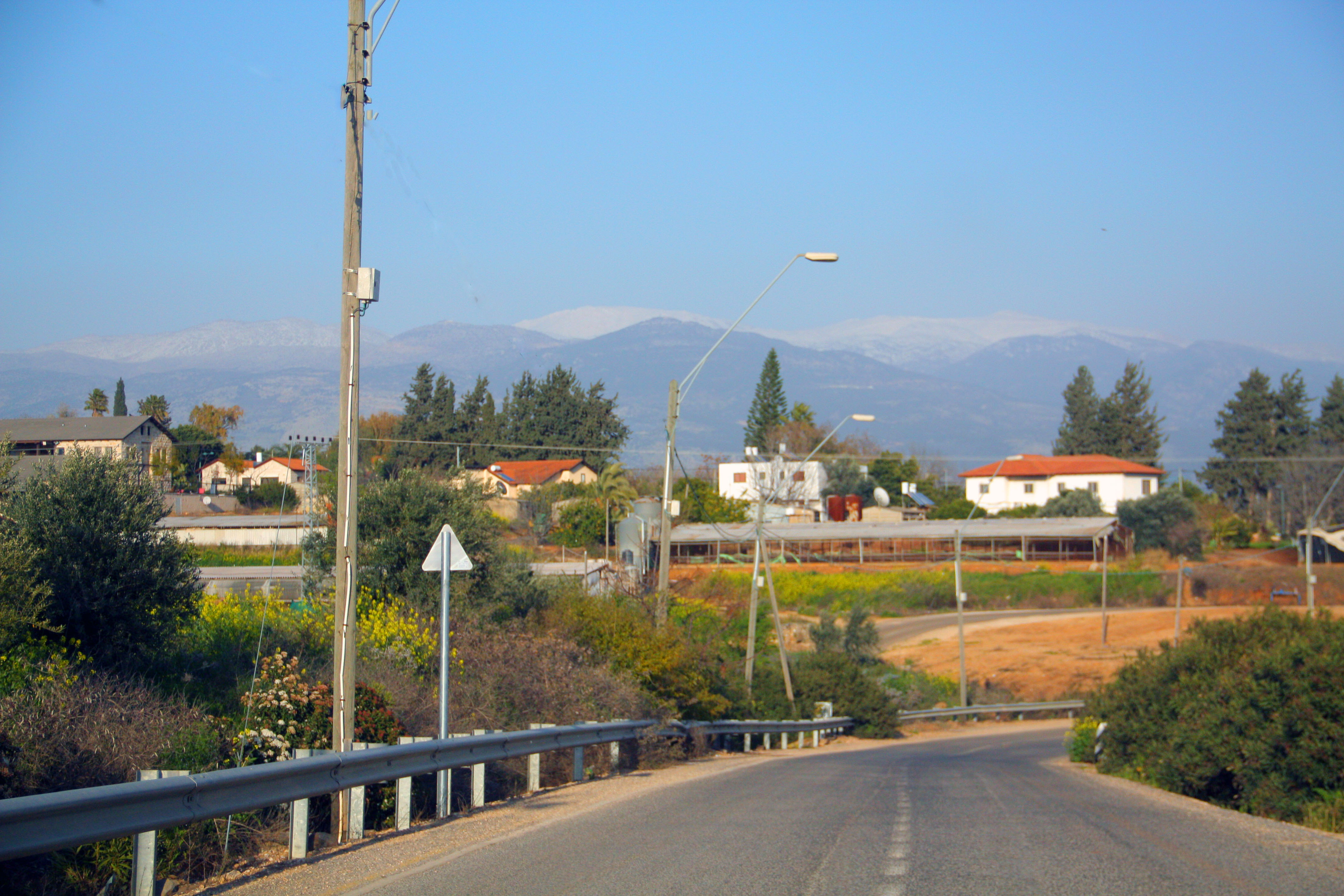
- Etymology: Creek
- Location within Northeast Israel Location within Israel
- Coordinates: 33°14′48″N 35°35′54″E
- Country: Israel
- District: Northern
- Subdistrict: Safed
- Council: Mevo'ot HaHermon
- Affiliation: Moshavim Movement
- Founded: 1953
- Founder: Kurdish Jews
- Population (2024): 886

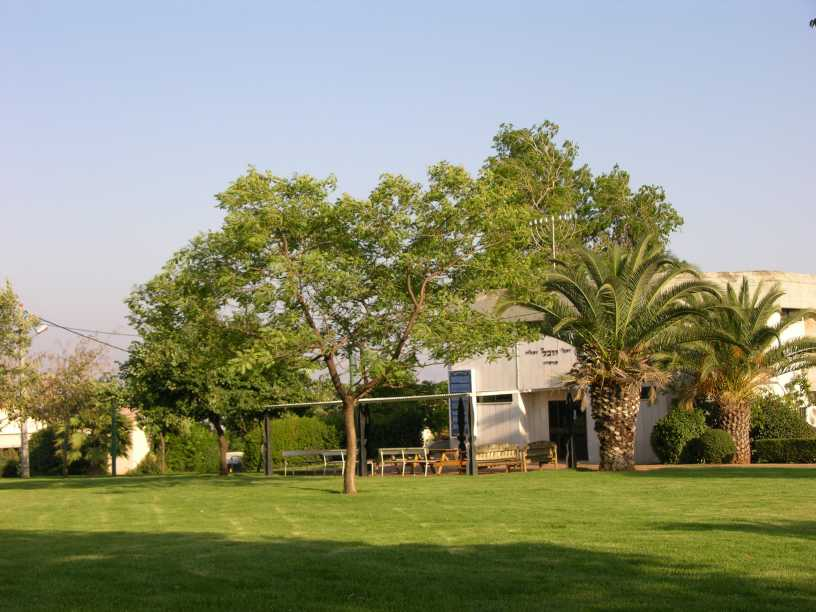
Synagogue of Yuval

Yuval (Hebrew: יובל, lit. 'Creek'), also known as Kfar Yuval, is a moshav in northern Israel. Located in the Galilee Panhandle between Metula and the city of Kiryat Shmona, it is at the border with Lebanon and falls under the jurisdiction of Mevo'ot HaHermon Regional Council. In 2024 it had a population of 886.

== Archaeology ==
Kfar Yuval was established on the land of the Palestinian depopulated village of al-Zūq al-Fauqānī.

During the Roman period, al-Zūq al-Fauqānī was called Golgol. The toponym Golgol is attested in a Late Roman boundary stone inscription discovered at Abil al-Qamḥ, and was preserved has in the Arabic Juneijil (جنيجل) near al-Zūq al-Fauqānī. Golgol has been previously misidentified with Tall al-ʿAjūl, near Abil al-Qamh, whose name is unrelated linguistically to the Roman toponym.

Archaeological finds at al-Zūq al-Fauqānī point to active occupation during the Roman and Byzantine periods. Excavations have revealed a burial cave from the 2nd to 4th centuries CE, which contained multiple burial niches, Roman-period oil lamps, glass vessels, and personal ornaments, indicating long-term use. A Late Roman lead sarcophagus decorated with a human face and vegetal motifs was recovered nearby in 1954. Other discoveries at the site include carved stone elements and the remains of an olive press, all consistent with a settled and agriculturally active community.

== Modern history ==
Yuval was founded in 1953 by evacuees from the Old City of Jerusalem (who originally arrived from Kurdistan) on land that had belonged to the depopulated Palestinian village of Abil al-Qamh. It was named "Yuval" (creek) after the Jordan river's tributaries in the area and also referring to Jeremiah 17:8 ("sends out its roots by the creek"). In the early 1960s most of the founders abandoned the moshav, and it was repopulated by Indian Jewish immigrants from Kochi.

The proximity of the moshav to the border of Israel with Lebanon has made it a target for attacks. In 1975 a group of terrorists infiltrated the moshav, took control of a residence, and killed three members of one family.

The main economic branches of the moshav, as of June 2004, are a chicken coop and plantations of avocado, apples, plums and oranges. Later, the moshav also relied on tourism from Israelis, and it became one of the leading places for village-style hospitality in northern Israel.

During the Gaza war, northern Israeli border communities, including Yuval, faced targeted attacks by Hezbollah and Palestinian factions based in Lebanon, and were largely evacuated. On 14 January 2024, Mira Ayalon, 76, and her son, Barak Ayalon, 40, were killed after anti-tank missiles struck their home in Yuval. Hezbollah claimed responsibility for the attack.

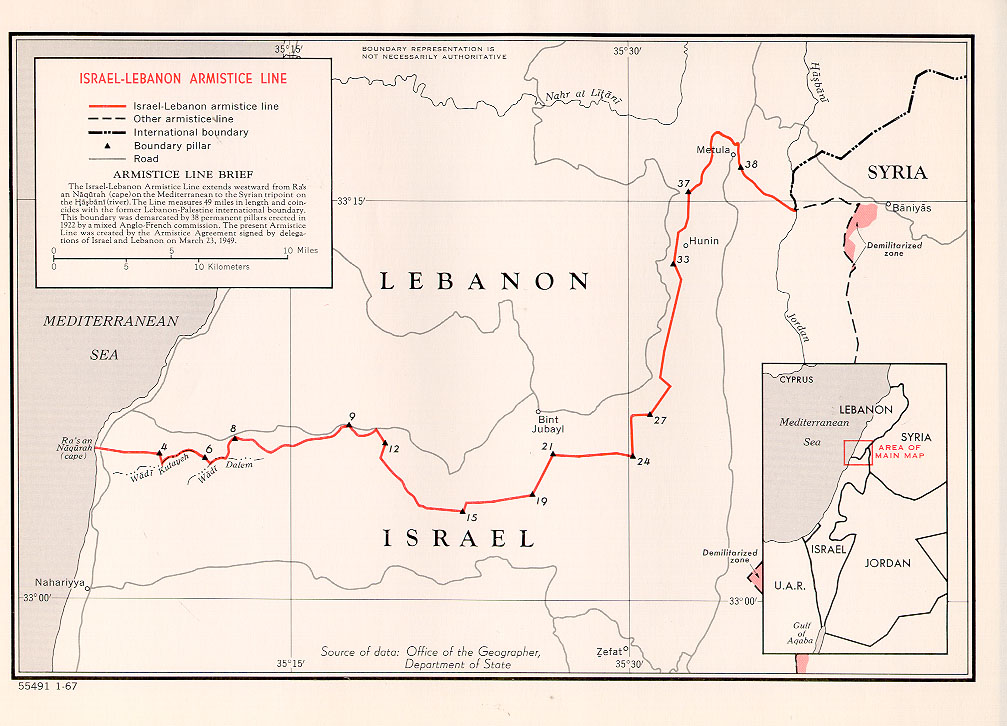
Lebanon border

On 3 March 2026, a rocket fired from Lebanon directly struck a hours in Kfar Yuval ,causing significant damage and lightly injuring one resident.
