= Sheba son of Bichri =

Hebrew Bible character (2 Samuel)

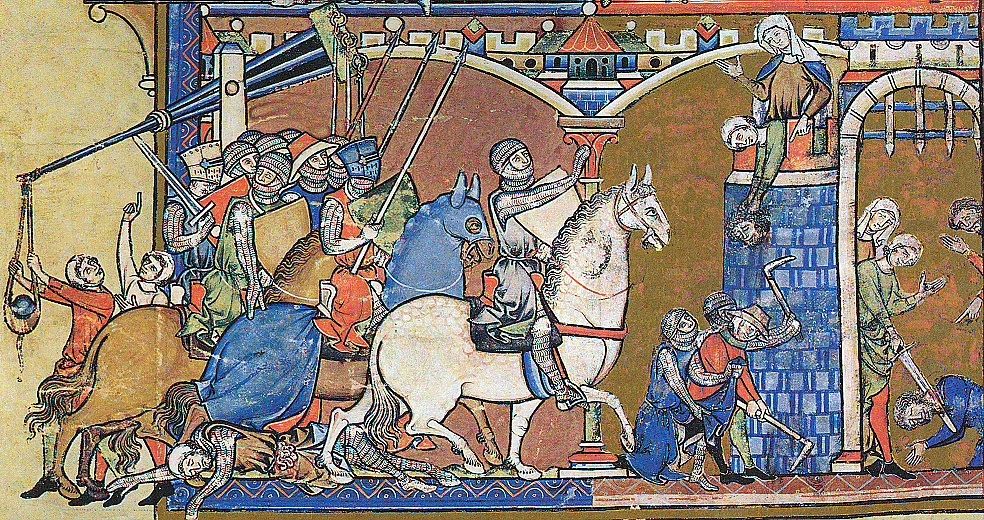
Illustration from the Morgan Bible of Joab approaching Abel-beth-maachah and Sheba's head being thrown down (2 Samuel 20).

Sheba son of Bichri (Biblical Hebrew: שֶׁבַע בֶּן־בִּכְרִי, romanized: Šeḇaʿ ben-Biḵrî) is a character in the Second Book of Samuel in the Hebrew Bible or the Christian Old Testament. In 2 Samuel 20, the narrative identifies Sheba son of Bichri as the leader of a Benjaminite revolt against King David.

== In the Bible ==
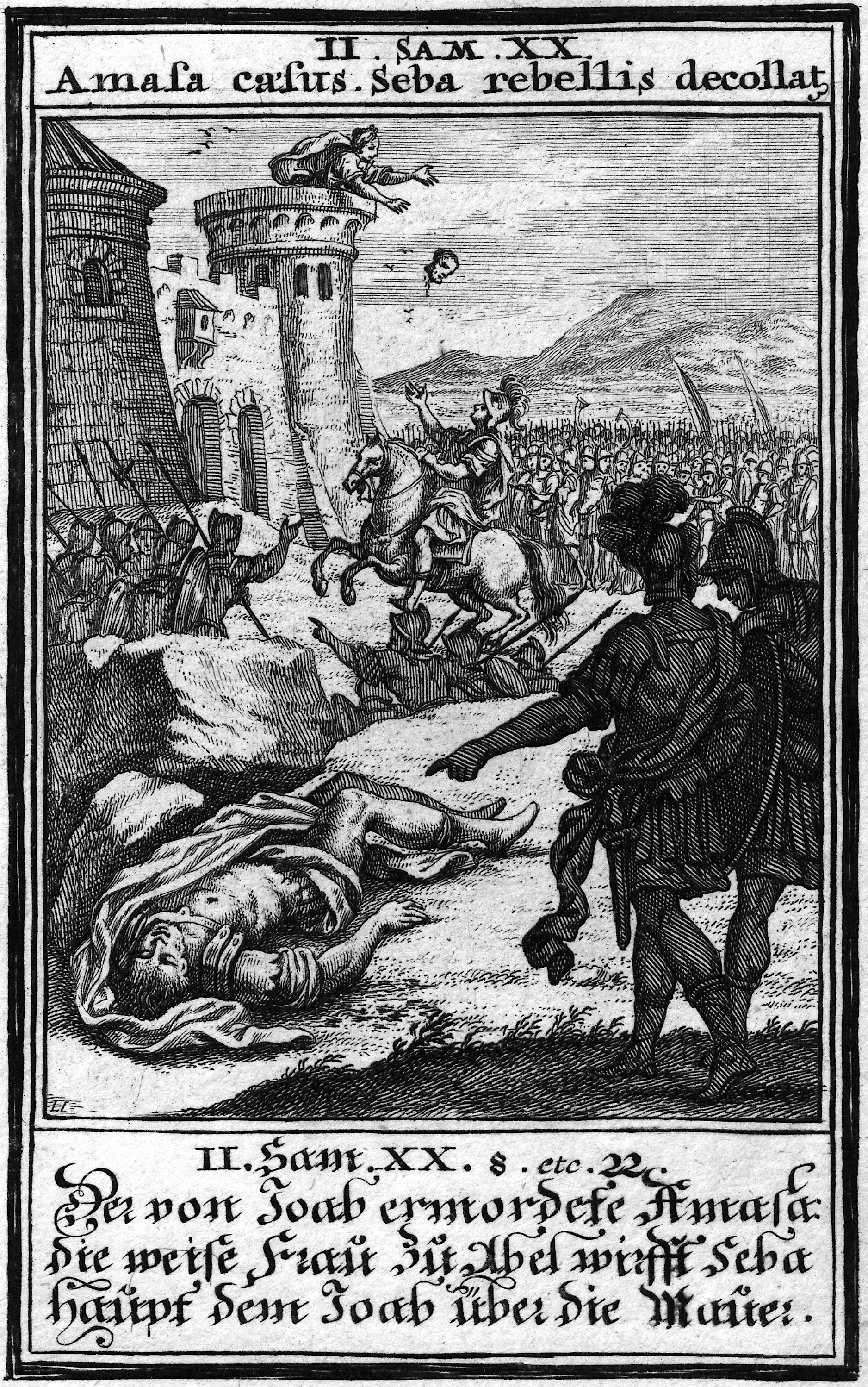
Woodcut by Johann Christoph Weigel, 1695, depicting the events of 2 Samuel 20. In the top of the picture, Sheba's head is thrown down over the wall, while the corpse of Amasa lies in the foreground.

Sheba was a son of Bichri, of the family of Becher, the son of Benjamin, and thus of the tribe of King Saul.

When David returned to Jerusalem after the defeat of Absalom, strife arose between the ten tribes and the Tribe of Judah, because the latter took the lead in bringing back the king. Sheba took advantage of this state of things, and raised the standard of revolt, proclaiming, "We have no part in David." With his followers he proceeded northward. David seeing it necessary to check this revolt, ordered Amasa to summon the army. When Amasa delayed his task, David appointed Abishai and Joab to take the gibborim ("mighty men") and the body-guard and such troops as he could gather, and pursue Sheba. Joab took the opportunity to kill Amasa. Then Joab and Abishai arrived at the city of Abel-beth-maachah, where they knew Sheba to be hiding. They besieged the city. An unnamed wise woman from the city convinced Joab not to destroy Abel Beth-Maacah, because the people did not want Sheba hiding there. She told the people of the city to kill Sheba, and his head was thrown over the wall to Joab.

== In the Talmud ==
In Tosefta Terumot 7:19, the rabbis debate whether it was proper under Jewish law to give up Sheba in order to save the city from Joab's army. Rabbi Simeon bar Yochai said giving up Sheba is forbidden. Rabbi Judah bar Ilai said the wise woman acted properly because Joab had the city surrounded. Everyone in the city would be killed including Sheba so it was better to give up Sheba and save everyone else.

This story served as the source for the subsequent halachic discussion whether it is permissible for a group or community to save itself by sacrificing an individual. The Tosefta establishes the principle that we may not save a community by sacrificing an individual, unless the original demand was for a specified individual. R. Shimon b. Lakish adds the condition that the specified individual be deserving of death because of a crime he committed. This view has been codified by Maimonides in his code of Jewish Law.

Sanhedrin 101b identified Sheba with two other men:

"A Tanna taught: Nebat, Micah, and Sheba the son of Bichri are one and the same." The three interpreted signs and portents to mean that they would reign. "Three beheld but did not see."
