= Kfar Yuval hostage crisis =

1975 hostage crisis in Israel

- Part of Palestinian insurgency in South Lebanon
- The attack site
- Native name: הפיגוע בכפר יובל
- Location: 33°14′48″N 35°35′53″E; Kfar Yuval, Israel
- Date: 15 June 1975; 51 years ago
- Attack type: hostage-taking
- Deaths: 3 Israelis (+ 4 attackers)
- Injuries: 3
- Perpetrator: Arab Liberation Front claimed responsibility
- No. of participants: 4

The Kfar Yuval hostage crisis, which took place during 15 June 1975, was a raid by a squad of Palestinian militants belonging to the Arab Liberation Front on the Israeli moshav of Kfar Yuval in which the militants took residents as hostages and attempted to bargain for the release of terrorists held in Israeli prisons. One person was killed during the takeover.

An IDF special unit freed the hostages and killed the four militants the same day. During the operation, an IDF soldier was killed, and his wife, one of the hostages, was fatally wounded.

== Details of the attack ==
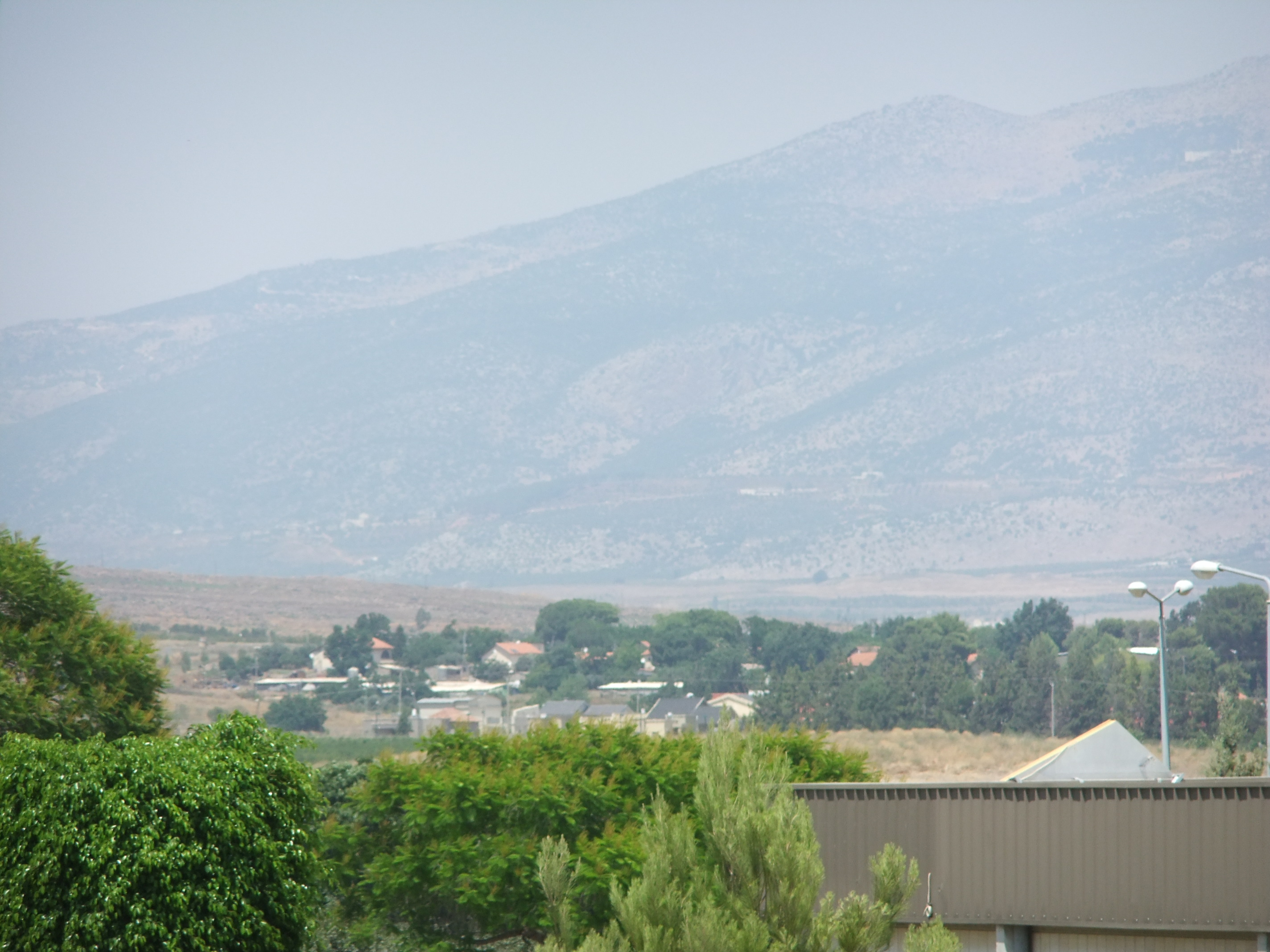
Moshav Kfar Yuval. Photo taken in 2011

On 13 June 1975 a squad of militants belonging to the Arab Liberation Front militant organization crossed the border from Lebanon, heading towards the Israeli village of Kfar Yuval. The squad, which was hiding in the apple plantations of the village, was not detected by the security forces, although security had been reinforced in the village after the breach in the border fence was discovered. On the night of 15 June four militants infiltrated a house in the village. One of the family members, Nehemiah Joseph, who was an Armored Corps soldier, attempted to stop them, blocking the entry to the house doors by gathering furniture next to the door, but was killed by the militants immediately; the other people in the house were taken hostage.

After Israeli military forces arrived at the scene negotiations with the militants began, with the help of the local resident Rahamim Cohen, who volunteered for the job as he spoke fluent Arabic. The militants presented a proclamation with demands to release prisoners detained in Israeli prisons, including Archbishop Hilarion Capucci and Japanese militant Kōzō Okamoto.

=== Takeover operation ===
Yaakov Mordecai, the husband of hostage Simcha Mordecai and a combat soldier in the Golani Brigade in his army service, heard about the hostage-taking while on his way to work and quickly returned to the village, not knowing that his wife and 11-month-old son were among the hostages. He spoke with the commander of the northern command and demanded to be allowed to join the takeover force, mainly because he knew how the rooms in the house were laid out. The commander of the northern command accepted and Yaakov joined the takeover operation team.

As the force began breaking into the house they were shot at by the militants. Yaakov went ahead of the rest of the takeover team and charged into the house and shot two militants dead, but was himself killed by a grenade that also fatally injured his wife Simcha. The rest of the takeover force, encouraged by Mordechai's daring move, broke into the house and in the resulting exchange of fire, killed the rest of the squad.

Yaakov Mordecai was killed and Yitzhak Yosef-Chai, the father of the family taken hostage, and his son Avraham Yosef-Chai were seriously injured during the exchange of fire. Yaakov's wife Simcha was also injured, and died the next day in the hospital. Their infant son Assaf was saved because his mother hid him in a washing machine. Both Assaf and his brother Bezalel were wounded.

Yaakov Mordecai was posthumously awarded the Medal of Courage.
