= Wise woman of Abel =

Figure in the Hebrew Bible

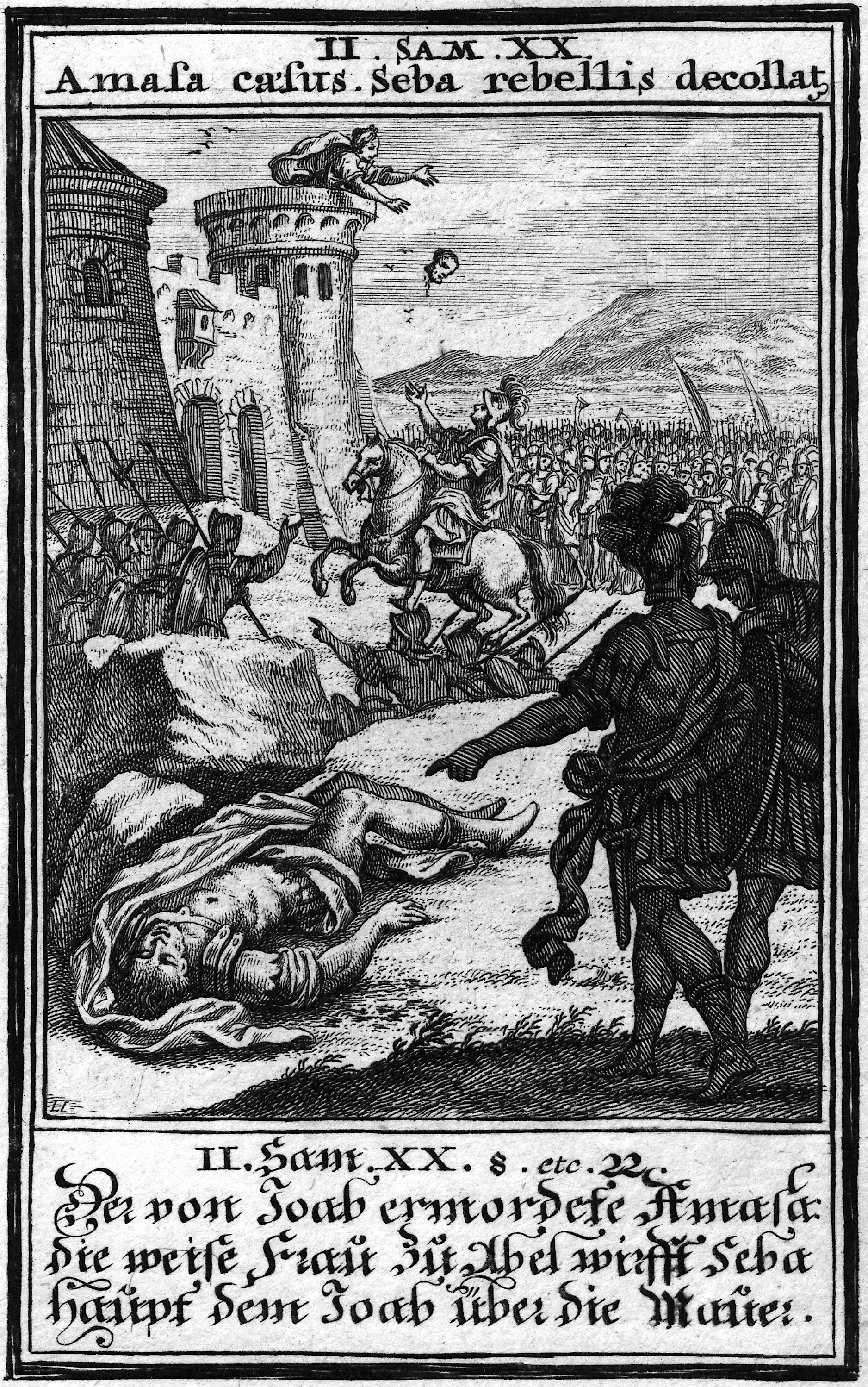
Woodcut by Johann Christoph Weigel, 1695, depicting the events of 2 Samuel 20. In the top of the picture, the woman is throwing Sheba's head down to Joab. In the foreground lies Amasa, whose death is described in the first half of the chapter.

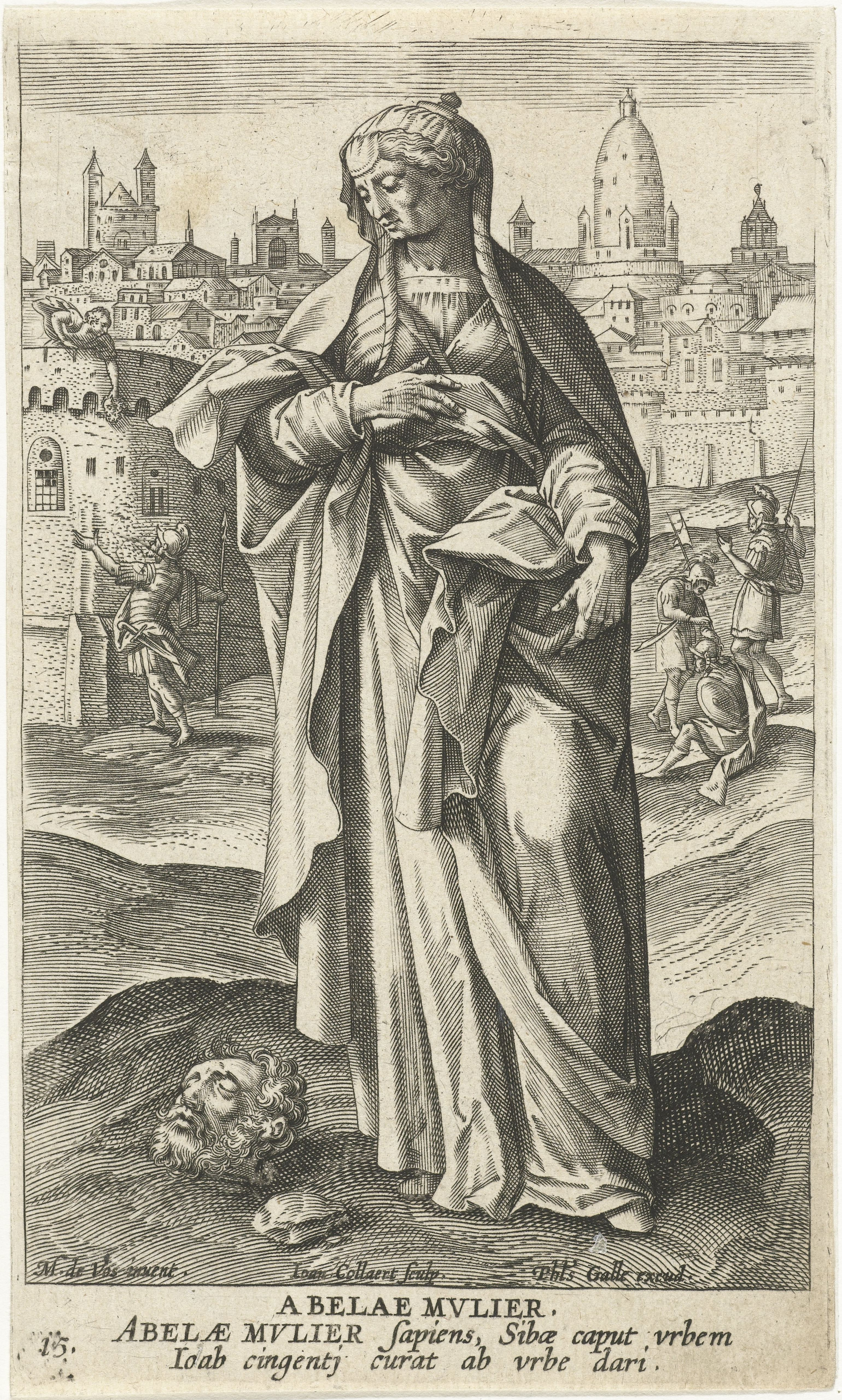
The wise woman of Abel with the head of Sheba

The wise woman of Abel is an unnamed figure in the Hebrew Bible. She appears in 2 Samuel 20, when Joab pursues the rebel Sheba to the city of Abel-beth-maachah. The woman, who lives in Abel, institutes a parley with Joab, who promises to leave the city if Sheba is handed over to him. The woman speaks to the people of the city, and they behead Sheba, throwing his head over the wall, at which Joab departs.

Susan Pigott notes that, like Abigail, the wise woman "prevents undue violence and bloodshed".

According to an Aggadic Midrash, the wise woman of Abel was Serah bat Asher, a person living around 650 years earlier.

== See also ==
- Woman of Tekoa
