= Al-Zuq al-Fawqani =

Al-Zuq al-Fawqani Zuq al-Hajj
- Village
- Etymology: Kh. Zûk el Hâj, the pilgrim’s town or village. Zak is a local Syriac word
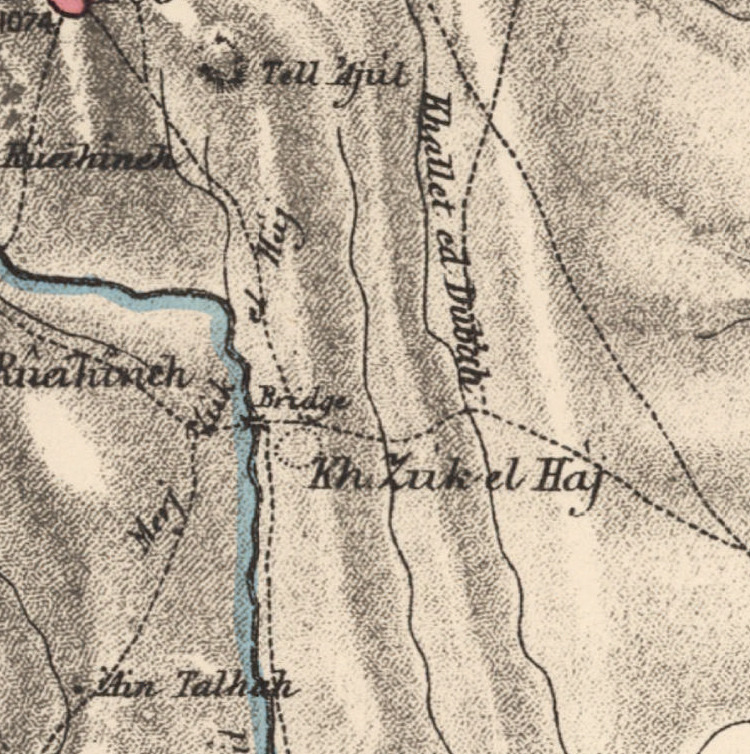
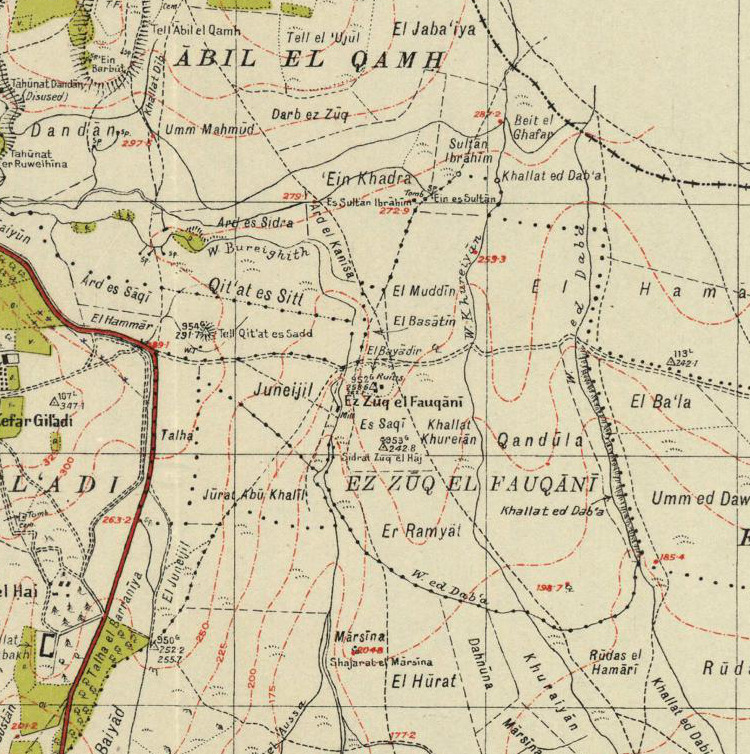
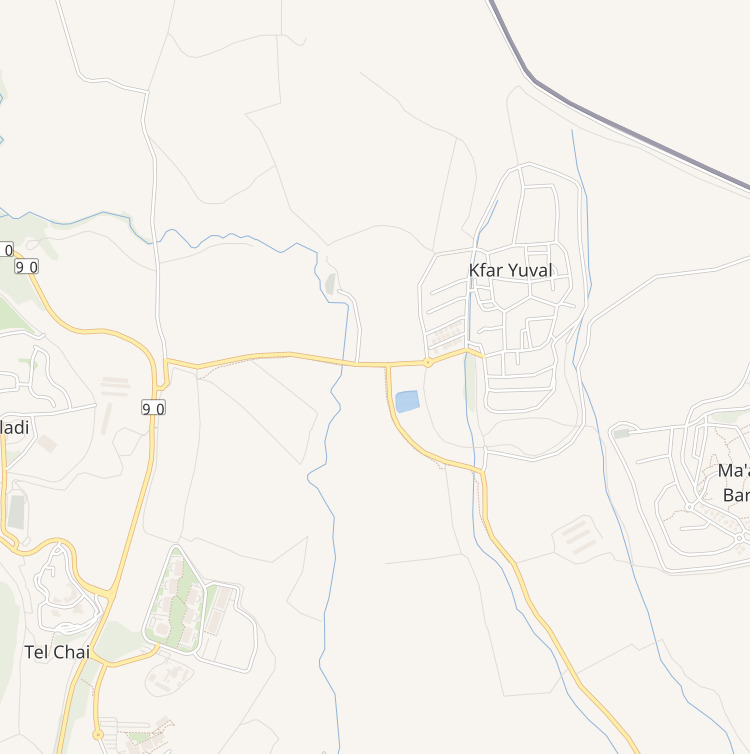
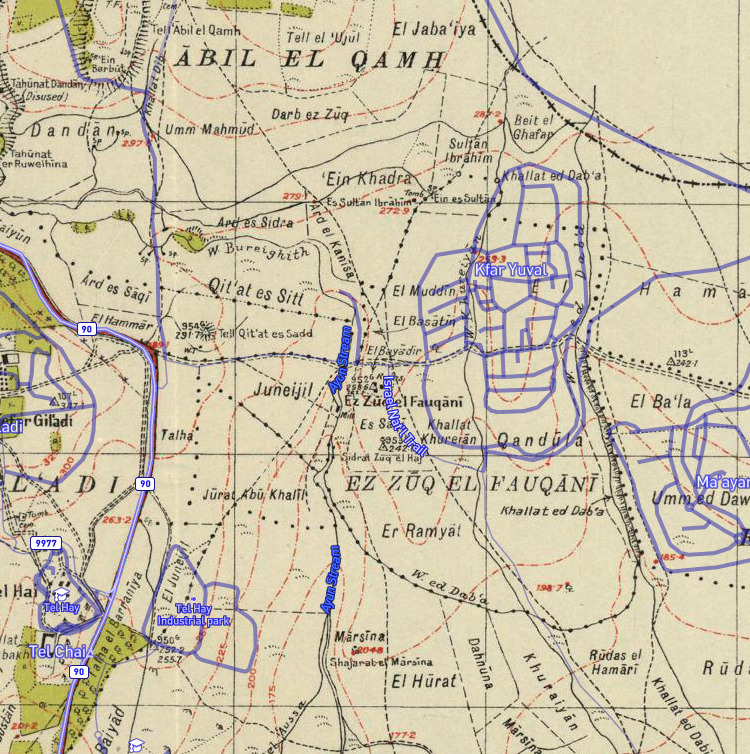
- 1870s map 1940s map modern map 1940s with modern overlay map A series of historical maps of the area around Al-Zuq al-Fawqani (click the buttons)

- Location within Mandatory Palestine
- Coordinates: 33°14′37″N 35°35′30″E
- Palestine grid: 205/294
- Geopolitical entity: Mandatory Palestine
- Subdistrict: Safad
- Date of depopulation: May 21, 1948

Area
  - Total: 1,832 dunams (1.832 km^{2}; 0.707 sq mi)

Population (1945)
  - Total: 160
- Cause(s) of depopulation: Whispering campaign
- Secondary cause: Military assault by Yishuv forces
- Current Localities: Yuval

Al-Zuq al-Fawqani was a Palestinian Arab village in the Safad Subdistrict. It was depopulated during the 1948 Arab-Israeli War on May 21, 1948, by the Palmach's First Battalion of Operation Yiftach. It was located 32 km northeast of Safad. It is identified with the Late Roman site of Golgol.

== History ==
=== Roman Golgol ===
During the Roman period, the site was called Golgol, a name deriving from the Semitic root GLGL, preserved in various biblical and post-biblical place names such as Gilgal. The toponym Golgol is attested in a Late Roman boundary stone inscription discovered at Abil al-Qamḥ, and was preserved in the Arabic Juneijil (جنيجل) near al-Zūq al-Fauqānī. Golgol has been previously misidentified with Tall al-ʿAjūl, near Abil al-Qamh, whose name is unrelated linguistically to the Roman toponym.

Archaeological finds at al-Zūq al-Fauqānī point to active occupation during the Roman and Byzantine periods. Excavations have revealed a burial cave from the 2nd to 4th centuries CE, which contained multiple burial niches, Roman-period oil lamps, glass vessels, and personal ornaments, indicating long-term use. A Late Roman lead sarcophagus decorated with a human face and vegetal motifs was recovered nearby in 1954. Other discoveries at the site include carved stone elements and the remains of an olive press, all consistent with a settled and agriculturally active community.

=== Mamluk period ===
Archeological excavations have shown that Al-Zuq al-Fawqani was populated in the late Mamluk era.

=== Ottoman era ===
Archeological excavations showed that a large hall, with several courtyards was constructed, probably a Khan. Damages indicate that it was destroyed in an earthquake. Pottery from Rashaya el-Fukhar was also found.

In 1875, Victor Guérin noted a large ruined village called Kharbet Khan ez-Zouk el-Fôkani. It was bordered in the west by Wadi Derdara, which was crossed on a small bridge, and had a water mill. There were many destroyed houses everywhere: they had been built with calcareous or basaltic stones, of different sizes and more or less well cut. Cisterns and presses attested an ancient origin. On the highest point of the village a house was still standing, which was of much more recent date.

In 1881, the PEF's Survey of Western Palestine noted at Kh. Zuk el Haj "Foundations of walls built with basaltic masonry."

=== British Mandate era ===
In the 1945 statistics it had a population of 160, with a total of 1,832 dunams of land, according to an official land and population survey. Of this, 503 dunums were for used for plantations and irrigable land, 1,286 were used for cereals; while a total of 43 dunams were classified as uncultivable.

=== 1948, and aftermath ===
Al-Zuq al-Fawqani first became depopulated on May 21, 1948, after a whispering campaign. In late May, many villagers returned, mainly to harvest the crops. The Haganah then started to systematically burn the villages in the area.

In 1992 the village site was described: "The stones of destroyed homes are strewn across the site, which is overgrown with grass, thorns, and a few cactus plants. The nearby settlement of Yuval cultivates part of the surrounding land, and uses the rest as forests and grazing grounds."

== Bibliography ==
- Conder, C.R.; Kitchener, H.H. (1881). The Survey of Western Palestine: Memoirs of the Topography, Orography, Hydrography, and Archaeology. Vol. 1. London: Committee of the Palestine Exploration Fund.
- Government of Palestine, Department of Statistics (1945). Village Statistics, April, 1945.
- Guérin, V (1880). Description Géographique Historique et Archéologique de la Palestine (in French). Vol. 3: Galilee, pt. 2. Paris: L'Imprimerie Nationale.
- Hadawi, S. (1970). Village Statistics of 1945: A Classification of Land and Area ownership in Palestine. Palestine Liberation Organization Research Centre. Archived from the original on 2018-12-08.
- Hartal, Moshe (2008-08-19). "Zuq el-Fauqani" (120). Hadashot Arkheologiyot – Excavations and Surveys in Israel. Archived from the original on 2012-02-22.
- Khalidi, W. (1992). All That Remains: The Palestinian Villages Occupied and Depopulated by Israel in 1948. Washington D.C.: Institute for Palestine Studies. ISBN 0-88728-224-5.
- Morris, B. (2004). The Birth of the Palestinian Refugee Problem Revisited. Cambridge University Press. ISBN 978-0-521-00967-6.
- Palmer, E.H. (1881). The Survey of Western Palestine: Arabic and English Name Lists Collected During the Survey by Lieutenants Conder and Kitchener, R. E. Transliterated and Explained by E.H. Palmer. Committee of the Palestine Exploration Fund.
