= Woman of Tekoa =

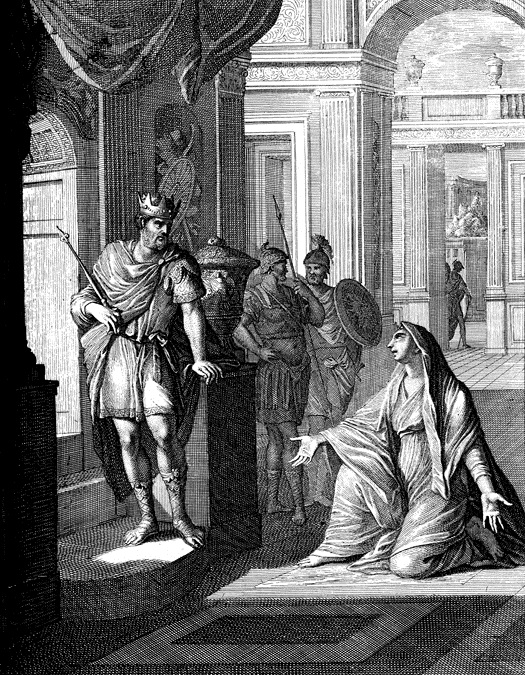
A depiction of the woman of Tekoa before David, by Caspar Luiken.

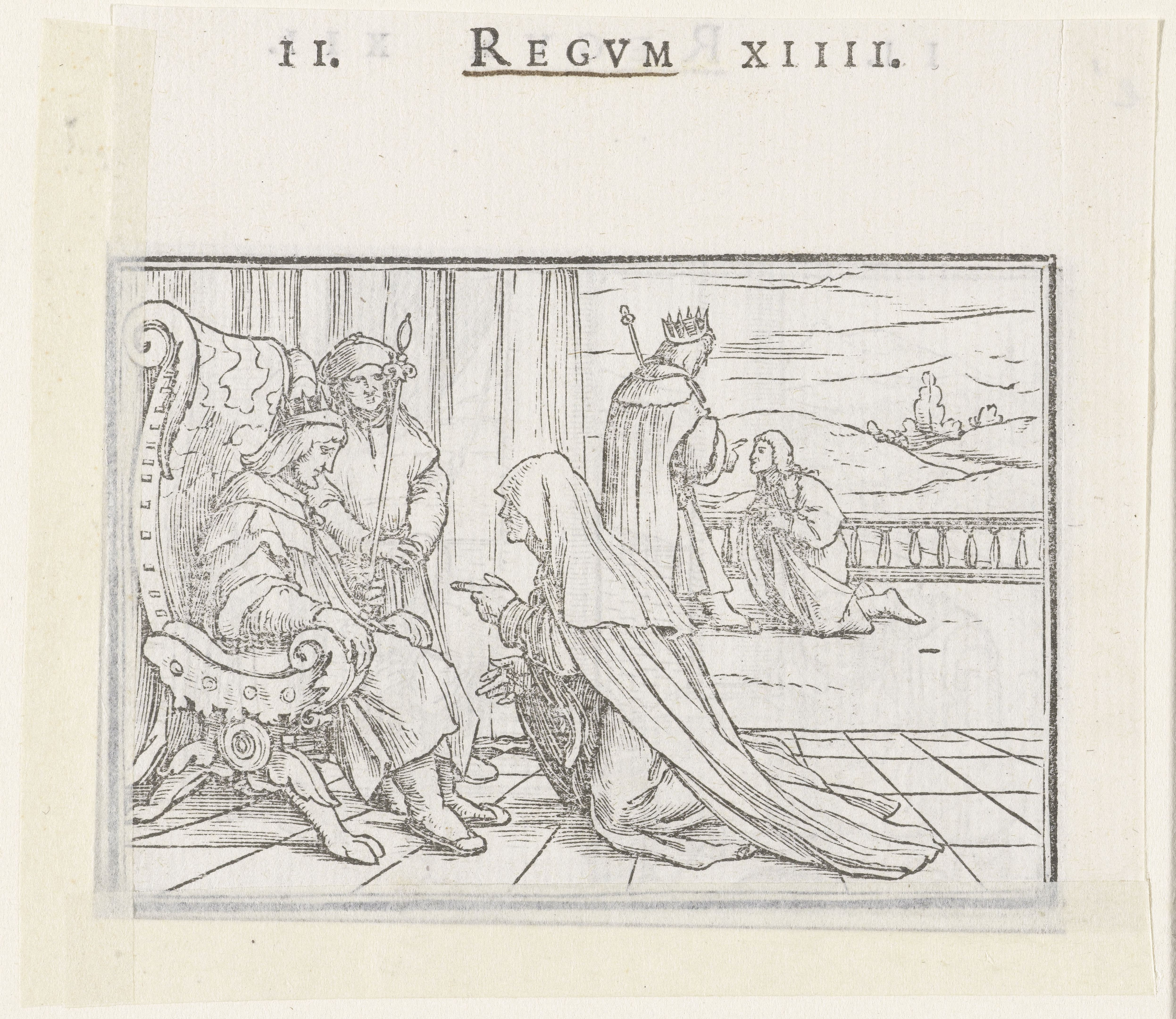
The woman of Tekoa, by Hans Holbein the Younger

The woman of Tekoa is an unnamed figure in the Hebrew Bible. She appears in 2 Samuel 14, after Absalom has been banished following his murder of Amnon. Joab wants David to be reconciled to Absalom, and he sends to Tekoa to find a "wise woman". Joab tells the woman to pretend to be mourning, and she tells a story to David to elicit his sympathy and obtain his favourable judgement. The woman says that her son killed his brother, and now the rest of the family wants to kill him. When David decides that her son should be spared, the Tekoite woman tells him that he should do the same for Absalom.

Claudia V. Camp suggests that the wise woman of Tekoa "employs the servile flattery of a social inferior," but that the narrative questions the "quality of the woman’s wisdom," since four years later Absalom rebelled against David. Jacob Hoftijzer, however, argues that the woman of Tekoa is a capable woman who is able to carry out a very delicate task.

== See also ==
- Wise woman of Abel
