= Abil al-Qamh =

Abil al-Qamh آبل القمح Abil al-Mayya
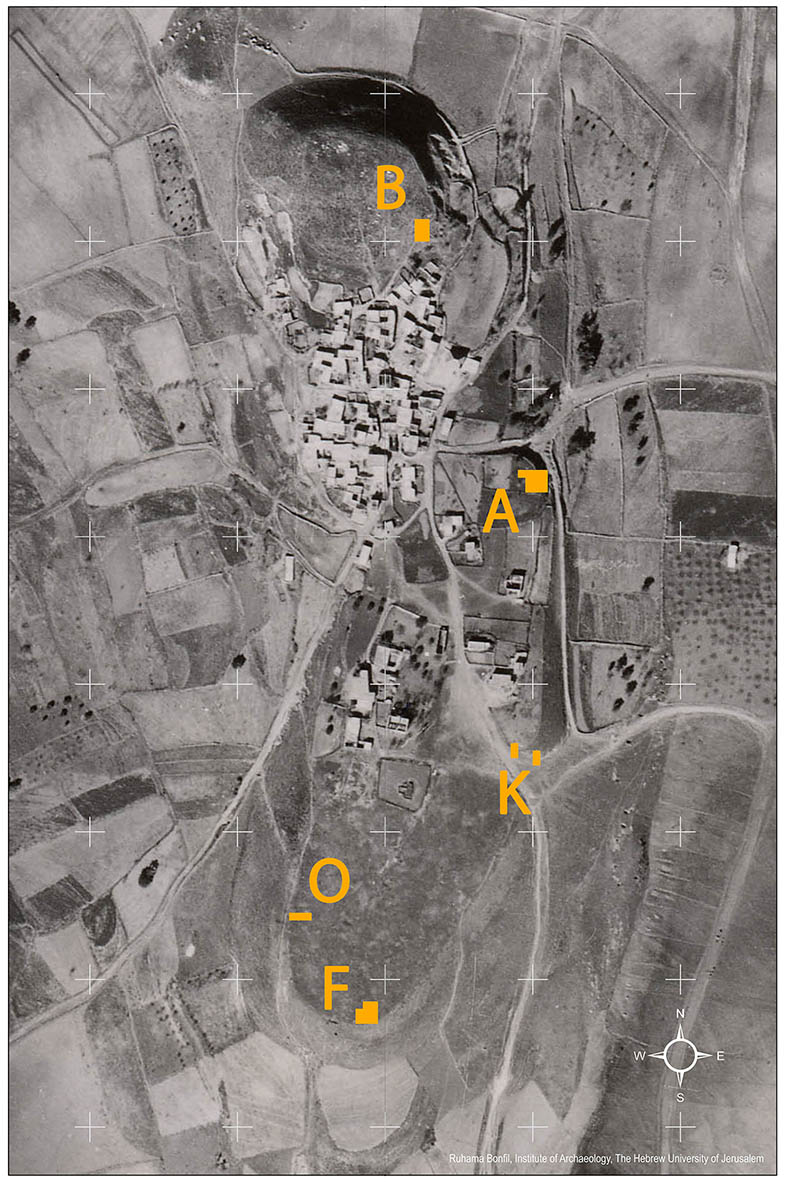
- Air-photo of the village in 1945; later excavation areas markedin letters
- Etymology: "Meadow of Wheat"
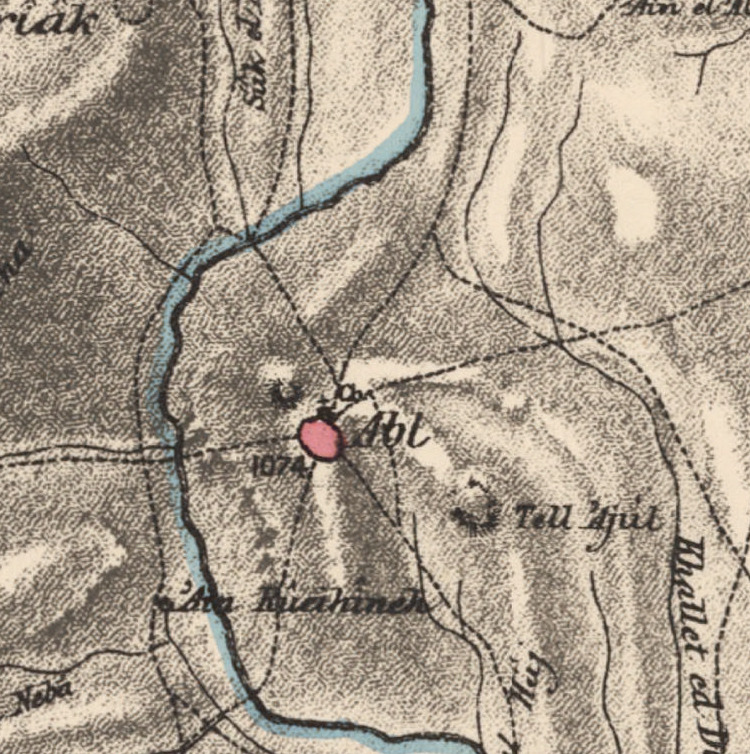
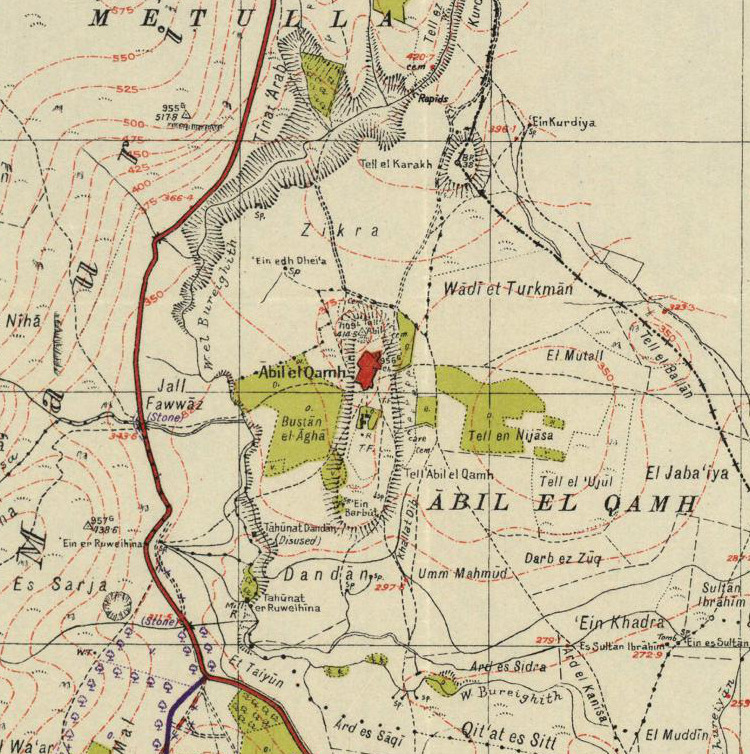
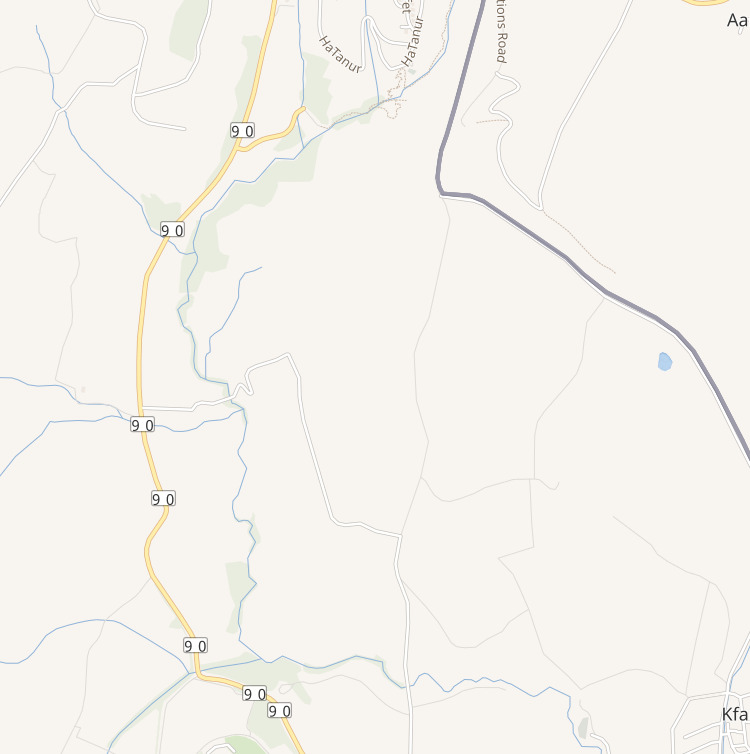
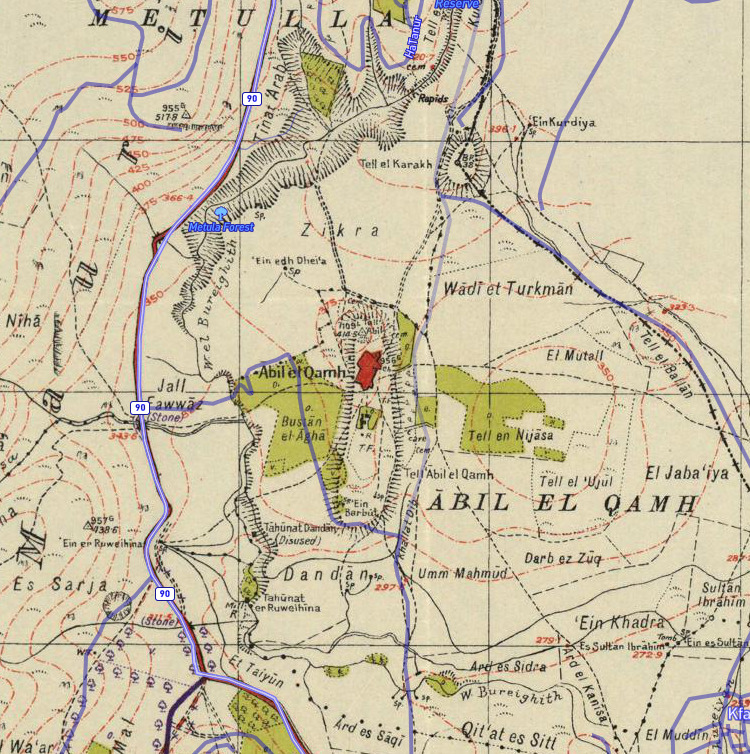
- 1870s map 1940s map modern map 1940s with modern overlay map A series of historical maps of the area around Abil al-Qamh (click the buttons)

- Location within Mandatory Palestine
- Coordinates: 33°15′34″N 35°34′51″E
- Palestine grid: 204/296
- Geopolitical entity: Mandatory Palestine
- Subdistrict: Safad
- Date of depopulation: May 10, 1948

Area
  - Total: 4.6 km^{2} (1.8 sq mi)

Population (1945)
  - Total: 330
- Cause(s) of depopulation: Fear of being caught up in the fighting
- Secondary cause: Influence of nearby town's fall
- Current Localities: Yuval

Abil al-Qamh (Arabic: آبل القمح) was a Palestinian village located near the Lebanese border north of Safad. It was depopulated during the 1948 Arab–Israeli War. It was located at the site of the biblical city of Abel-beth-maachah.

== Name ==
According to historian Walid Khalidi, the village's Arabic name derives from Aramaic; the first part of its name, abil, means "meadow" and the latter part, qamh, means "wheat". Edward Henry Palmer, a nineteenth-century orientalist writer, believed the name "abl" derived from the biblical name Abel Beth Maachah.

== History ==
=== Bronze Age and Iron Age ===
Abil al-Qamh was established on a site that had been inhabited since 2900 BCE and remained populated for over 2,000 years. It was captured by Thutmose III in 1468 BCE. During the Israelite period, under the reign of David, it was fortified, and later conquered by the Arameans. In 734 BCE it was incorporated into the Assyrian Empire.

=== Byzantine period ===
Ceramics from the Byzantine Empire era have been found in the area.

=== Mamluk period ===
During the Mamluk period in 1226 CE, Arab geographer Yaqut al-Hamawi mentions "Abil al Kamh" as a village belonging to Banias, located between Damascus and the Mediterranean Sea.

=== Ottoman period ===
In 1517, Abil al-Qamh was incorporated into the Ottoman Empire, and by 1596 it was under the administration of the nahiya ("subdistrict") of Tibnin, part of Sanjak Safad. The name used was Abil al-Qamh, and it had a population of 24 families and 2 bachelors, an estimated 143 persons total. All the villagers were Muslim. They paid a fixed tax rate of 25% on wheat, barley, olives, beehives, vineyards, goats and beehives; a total of 1,846 Akçe.

In 1838, it was noted as Catholic village in the Mejr Ayun district.

In 1875 Victor Guérin visited Abil al-Qamh, calling it Tell Abel Kamah. On the highest point, to the north, he found the ruins of a wall and a Muslim cemetery. In 1881, the PEF's Survey of Western Palestine (SWP) described the village as being near a stream and containing a church and ancient ruins.

=== British Mandate ===
Abil al-Qamh was a part of the French Mandate of Lebanon until 1923, when it was incorporated into the British Mandate in Palestine. In the first half of the 20th century, it had a triangular outline that conformed to the hill on which it was built. Agriculture was the basis of its economy, and the village's abundant water supply earned it the local name of Abil al-Mayya meaning the "Meadow of Water".

In the 1931 census of Palestine, Abil al-Qamh had a total population of 229; 122 Muslims and 107 Christians, in total 58 houses.

In the 1945 statistics, the population was 330; 230 Muslims and 100 Christians, with a total of 4,615 dunams of land, according to an official land and population survey. The village had a mixed population of 230 Shia Muslims and 100 Arab Christians. A total of 3,535 dunums of land were allocated to cereals; 299 dunums were irrigated or used for orchards, while 13 dunams was built-up (urban) area.

=== 1948 and aftermath ===
Abil al-Qamh was captured on May 10, 1948 by the First Battalion of the Palmach commanded by Yigal Allon in Operation Yifatch. The town emptied of residents after capture for reasons that are disputed. Palestinian historian Walid Khalidi and Israeli historian Benny Morris don't disagree over the facts that there was no direct fighting in the village, and that there was fear among residents after the fall of Safad to Israel. However, in Khalidi's account, he viewed the town as depopulated after Jewish leaders went to the heads of Arab villages (makhatir) warning them of massive Jewish reinforcements arriving in the Galilee, causing the residents of Abil al-Qamh to flee. Morris' did not find evidence of a "whispering campaign" towards the town, though he did in other locations. He classified the departures as due to the residents own fears. He wrote there was fear of being caught up in the fighting, but also that there were in general "Arab fears of falling under Jewish rule."

In 1952, Israel established the town of Yuval on village lands, 1.5 kilometers (0.93 mi) from the village site. The Abil al-Qamih area itself became "overgrown with grasses and weeds. A grove of trees stands in the northeast corner, and stones from destroyed houses are strewn throughout the site...," according to Palestinian historian Walid Khalidi, writing in 1992.

In recent years, the Lebanese Authorities have claimed that Abil al-Qamh and six other depopulated Shia villages along the border rightfully belong to Lebanon.

The two mounds belonging to the archaeological site known as Tell Abil el-Qameḥ in Arabic and Tel Abel Beth Maacah in Hebrew have been surveyed in 2012 and have since been excavated in annual campaigns (four as of 2016).

== Refugees ==
The inhabitants of Abil al-Qamh fled to neighbouring villages in Lebanon during the 1948 Arab–Israeli War. While Shiites fled to neighboring Shia villages, Christians notably fled to Deir Mimas, where most of them later acquired Lebanese passports; still living in Deirmimas are for instance the families of Abdo, Keserwany, Harfouch, and Haddad originally from the Abil al-Qamih area.

== See also ==
- List of towns and villages depopulated during the 1947–1949 Palestine war
- Metawali - Shia Twelvers in Lebanon
- Shia villages in Palestine

== Bibliography ==
- Conder, C.R.; Kitchener, H.H. (1881). The Survey of Western Palestine: Memoirs of the Topography, Orography, Hydrography, and Archaeology. Vol. 1. London: Committee of the Palestine Exploration Fund.
- Dauphin, C. (1998). La Palestine byzantine, Peuplement et Populations. BAR International Series 726 (in French). Vol. III : Catalogue. Oxford: Archeopress. ISBN 0860549054.
- Department of Statistics (1945). Village Statistics, April, 1945. Government of Palestine.
- Guérin, V. (1880). Description Géographique Historique et Archéologique de la Palestine (in French). Vol. 3: Galilee, pt. 2. Paris: L'Imprimerie Nationale.
- Hadawi, S. (1970). Village Statistics of 1945: A Classification of Land and Area ownership in Palestine. Palestine Liberation Organization Research Centre. Archived from the original on 2018-12-08.
- Hütteroth, W.-D.; Abdulfattah, K. (1977). Historical Geography of Palestine, Transjordan and Southern Syria in the Late 16th Century. Erlanger Geographische Arbeiten, Sonderband 5. Erlangen, Germany: Vorstand der Fränkischen Geographischen Gesellschaft. ISBN 3-920405-41-2.
- Khalidi, W. (1992). All That Remains: The Palestinian Villages Occupied and Depopulated by Israel in 1948. Washington D.C.: Institute for Palestine Studies. ISBN 0-88728-224-5.
- Le Strange, G. (1890). Palestine Under the Moslems: A Description of Syria and the Holy Land from A.D. 650 to 1500. Committee of the Palestine Exploration Fund.
- Mills, E., ed. (1932). Census of Palestine 1931. Population of Villages, Towns and Administrative Areas. Jerusalem: Government of Palestine.
- Morris, B. (2004). The Birth of the Palestinian Refugee Problem Revisited. Cambridge University Press. ISBN 978-0-521-00967-6.
- Palmer, E.H. (1881). The Survey of Western Palestine: Arabic and English Name Lists Collected During the Survey by Lieutenants Conder and Kitchener, R. E. Transliterated and Explained by E.H. Palmer. Committee of the Palestine Exploration Fund.
- Robinson, E.; Smith, E. (1841). Biblical Researches in Palestine, Mount Sinai and Arabia Petraea: A Journal of Travels in the year 1838. Vol. 3. Boston: Crocker & Brewster.
- Rhode, H. (1979). Administration and Population of the Sancak of Safed in the Sixteenth Century. Columbia University. Archived from the original on 2020-03-01.
