= Amasa =

Biblical nephew of King David and military commander of Israel

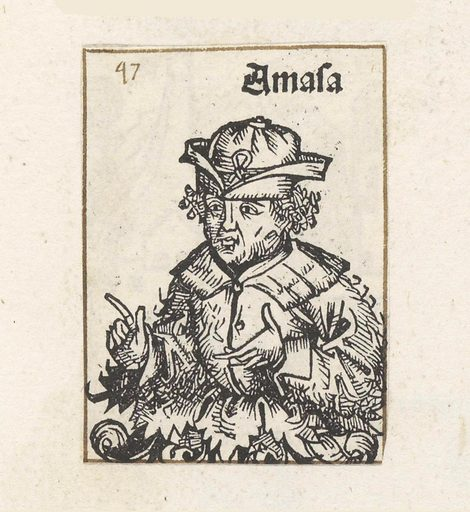
Woodcut of Amasa in the Nuremberg Chronicle by Hartmann Schedel, 1493.

Amasa (Hebrew: עמשא) or Amessai is a person mentioned in the Hebrew Bible. His mother was Abigail (2 Samuel 17:25), a sister of King David (1 Chronicles 2:16,17). Hence, Amasa was a nephew of David, and cousin of Joab, David's military commander, as well as a cousin of Absalom, David's son. David calls him "my bone and my flesh" (2 Samuel 19:13).

== Biblical references ==
Amasa's father was Jether (1 Kings 2:5,32, 1 Chronicles 2:17) who was also called Ithra (2 Samuel 17:25). Jether had dual-nationality, being an Ishmaelite and Israelite, although it might be a case of an assimilated Ishmaelite living in Israel.

When Absalom rebelled against David and won over the tribes of Israel (2 Samuel 15), Absalom appointed Amasa as commander over the army (2 Samuel 17:25), in effect replacing Joab, who had served as commander for David.

After the revolt was crushed and Absalom died (2 Samuel 18:1–17), David was invited back to Jerusalem and restored as king. David re-appointed Amasa as his military commander in Joab's stead "from now on" as his military commander (2 Samuel 19:13). Other versions translate this status differently: it is given as "permanently" in the Jewish Publication Society 1985 translation and "for life" in the New International Version.

David's appointment of Amasa has been interpreted as "a bold stroke of policy, to promise the post of commander-in chief to the general of the rebel army".

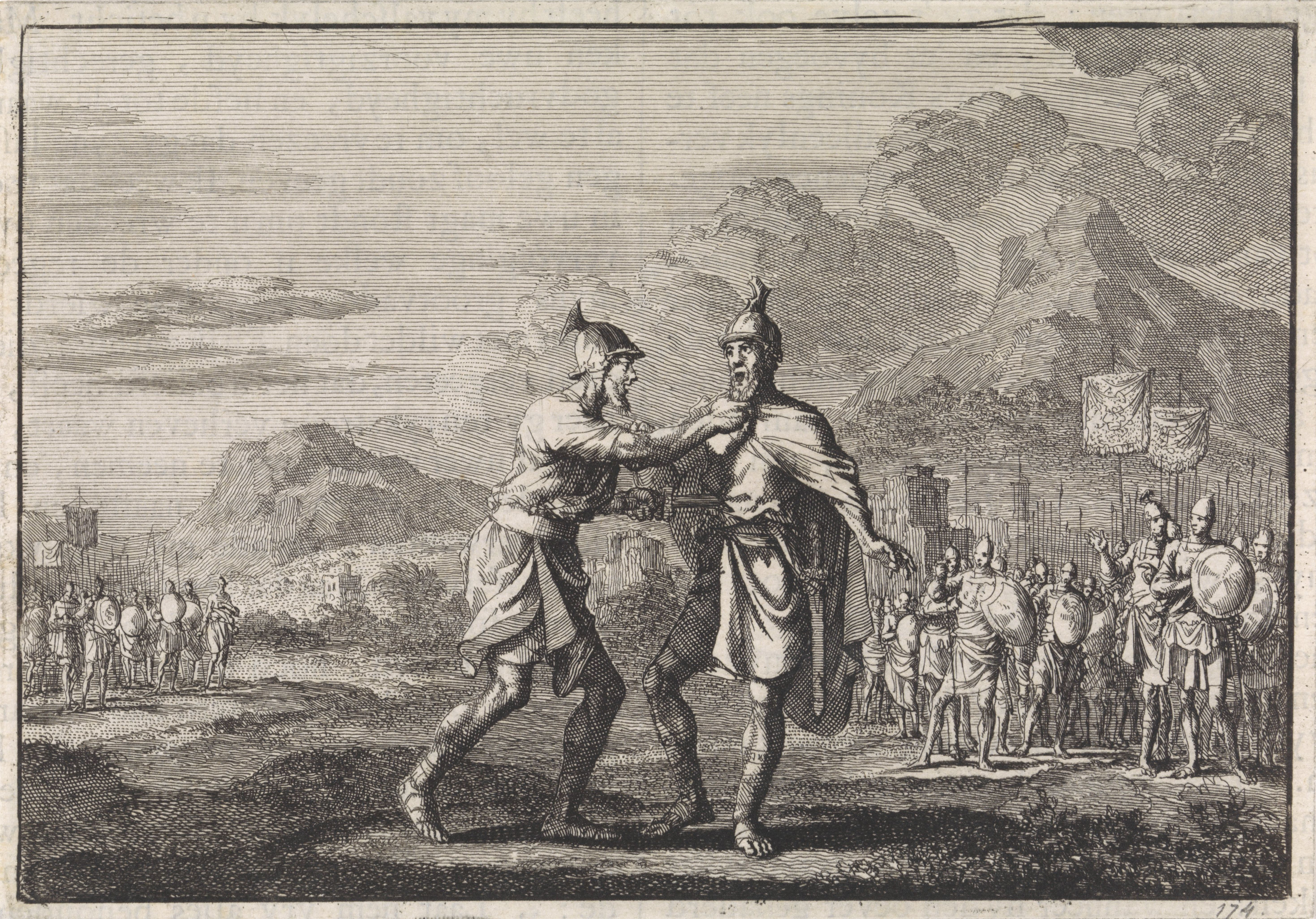
Joab kills Amasa, Jan Luyken, 1704

While being fiercely loyal to David, Joab was also suspicious of any potential rivals for Joab's power or threats to David's kingdom, and had no qualms about taking the lives of any who might stand in his way (e.g., Abner: 2 Sam 3:27, and Absalom: 2 Sam 18:14). So it was not difficult for Joab to also decide to murder Amasa (2 Sam 20:10, 1 Kgs 2:5,32). Joab's own justification for killing Amasa may have been because he believed Amasa to be conspiring with Sheba son of Bichri the Benjamite, due to Amasa's slowness to mobilize the army against Sheba's rebels (2 Sam 20:4,5).

The murder of Amasa is cited as one of the reasons (beside the murder of Abner, 2 Sam 3:27) why David on his deathbed counsels his son Solomon to have Joab executed (1 Kgs 2:5–6). Solomon fulfills this wish (1 Kgs 2:32–34) right after the execution of his own half-brother Adonijah (1 Kgs 2:25), a pretender to the throne whom Joab had supported (cf. 1 Kgs 1:7,19,41).
