= 2 Samuel 10 =

Second Book of Samuel chapter

- ← chapter 9 chapter 11 →
- The pages containing the Books of Samuel (1 & 2 Samuel) Leningrad Codex (1008 CE).
- Book: First book of Samuel
- Hebrew Bible part: Nevi'im
- Order in the Hebrew part: 3
- Category: Former Prophets
- Christian Bible part: Old Testament
- Order in the Christian part: 10

2 Samuel 10 is the tenth chapter of the Second Book of Samuel in the Old Testament of the Christian Bible or the second part of Books of Samuel in the Hebrew Bible. Jewish tradition attributes the book to the prophet Samuel, with later additions by the prophets Gad and Nathan; modern scholarship, however, regards it as a compilation of independent texts dated to c. 630–540 BCE. This chapter contains the account of David's reign in Jerusalem. This chapter is part of a section covering 2 Samuel 9–20 and continuing to 1 Kings 1–2, which describes the power struggles among David's sons to succeed him, until the kingdom was firmly established in Solomon's hands (1 Kings 2:46).

== Text ==
This chapter was originally written in Biblical Hebrew. It is divided into 19 verses.

=== Textual witnesses ===
Some early manuscripts containing the text of this chapter in Biblical Hebrew are of the Masoretic Textual tradition, which includes the Codex Cairensis (895), Aleppo Codex (10th century), and Codex Leningradensis (1008). Fragments containing parts of this chapter in Hebrew were found among the Dead Sea Scrolls including 4Q51 (4QSam^{a}; 100–50 BCE) with extant verses 4–7 and 18–19.

Extant ancient manuscripts of a translation into Koine Greek known as the Septuagint (compiled in the last few centuries BCE) include Codex Vaticanus (B; $\mathfrak{G}$^{B}; 4th century) and Codex Alexandrinus (A; $\mathfrak{G}$^{A}; 5th century). (Note: The whole book of 2 Samuel is missing from the extant Codex Sinaiticus.)

== Analysis ==
The historic wars with Ammon and Aram are recorded in 2 Samuel 10–12 in connection with the David–Bathsheba affair and the succession narrative thereafter. This chapter comprises 3 parts:

1. Humiliation of David's envoys by the Ammonites (10:1–5)
2. Joab's victory over the Ammonites (10:6–14)
3. David's victory over the Arameans (10:15–19)

At the center of the chapter, Joab, David's commander, prayed for divine assistance: "may the LORD do what seems good to him" (verse 12), and God heard his prayer, confirming that God would help David (and his army) "wherever he went".

== Humiliation of David's envoys by the Ammonites (10:1–5) ==
The section begins with the clause, "and it was after this" (Biblical Hebrew: וַיְהִי אַחֲרֵי־כֵן, romanized: wayhî ʾaḥărê-ḵēn), indicating an indeterminate period of time since the events of the last chapter. (Note: The clause "wayehî ’a-ḥă-rê-ḵên", "and-happened after this", occurs 10 times in the Hebrew Bible, six times in the Books of Samuel (1 Samuel 24:5; 2 Samuel 2:1; 8:1; 10:1; 13:1; 21:18) and twice in the parallel passages in the Books of Chronicles (1 Chronicles 18:1; 19:1), with twice in the Book of Judges) The death of Nahash of Ammon, the king of the Ammonites and an ally of David, led David to send a mourning envoy to pay his respects and to maintain good relations with Hanun, Nahash's son and successor. However, Hanun, who suspected David's motives, humiliated the envoys. It was common in ancient Near East that, during a transition of power, a neighboring kingdom would attack an inexperienced king—just as the Philistines tried to attack David upon his anointing in Hebron (2 Samuel 2:1), or when the Moabites rebelled against Ahaziah, the king of Israel who ascended the throne after Ahab, his father, died (2 Kings 1:1 and 3:5).

The section opens in David's court (10:1); the king's envoys are dispatched (10:2), and the political scene is set. What follows is a swift shift of perspective: the action moves to Hanun's court, where rumor and suspicion take hold (10:3a). There, accusations against the envoys are voiced and believed (10:3b–4), and Hanun's rash decision to humiliate the messengers becomes the story's fulcrum. That central confrontation—charged with misreading and dishonor—drives the narrative forward and determines the stakes for both courts. The sequence closes by returning to David's court, completing a compact dramatic arc that begins with royal initiative, passes through foreign misjudgment, and resolves in its aftermath. The episode begins and ends in David's court, while the central event happens in Hanun's court.

=== Verse 2 ===
Then David said, "I will show kindness to Hanun the son of Nahash, as his father showed kindness to me."
So David sent by the hand of his servants to comfort him concerning his father. And David's servants came into the land of the people of Ammon.

- "I will show kindness" (אֶעֱשֶׂה־חֶסֶד, ’eʿĕśeh‑ḥesed): with the term chesed here more idiomatically connoting "loyalty" both times.
- Nahash, king of the Ammonites, was Saul's enemy in 1 Samuel 11, so it is reasonable that he favored David. Nahash attacked Jabesh-Gilead in c. 1049 BCE, so by his death in c. 998 BCE, he may have reigned for nearly 50 years.

== Joab's victory over the Ammonites (10:6–14) ==
Facing imminent retaliation from David for the humiliation of Israelite envoys, the Ammonites asked for help from the Arameans (verse 6) of four Aramean states: Zobah and Aram Rehob to the south, Maacah (Aram-Maacah in 1 Chronicles 19:6) north of Manasseh in Transjordan, and Tob, further south. Compared with the narrative in 2 Samuel 8:3–5, the course of the Aramean conflict could be reconstructed as follows:

- a first battle outside the gate of Rabbah (10:6–14).
- a second battle in the region of Helam in northern Gilead (10:15–19).
- a final and decisive battle in which Hadadezer ben Rehob's coalition was conquered (8:3–8).

Joab successfully fought a battle in Rabbah on two fronts, but was not in a position to take more advantage, so he returned to Jerusalem (verse 14).

== David's victory over the Arameans (10:15–19) ==
Under David's leadership, the fight yielded a much better result: the Arameans fled before David, who killed many of them, including Shobach, Hadadezer's commander (verse 18), effectively neutralizing Aram's power. After this defeat, Hadadezer's vassals transferred their allegiance to David (verse 19).

=== Verse 19 ===
And when all the vassal kings of Hadadezer saw that they had been routed by Israel, they submitted to Israel and became their vassals. And the Arameans were afraid to help the Ammonites anymore.

This verse does not employ wordplay: Hadadezer's vassals saw (וַיִּרְאוּ, wayyirʾū, 'they saw') that they were defeated, and the Arameans thereafter feared (וַיִּרְאוּ, wayyirʾū, 'they feared') to aid the Ammonites again. Because the consonantal spelling ויראו is identical in both clauses, some Christian interpreters have suggested a pun; yet the Masoretic vocalization distinguishes two separate roots—רָאָה (raʾah, lit. 'to see') and יָרֵא (yārēʾ, lit. 'to fear')—so the narrative progression is causal (going from perception to fear), not literary wordplay.

== See also ==
- Syria
- Beard
- Chariot
- Helam
- Horses in warfare
- Ishtob
- Jerusalem
- Jericho
- Jordan River
- Israel
- Related Bible parts: 1 Samuel 11, 2 Samuel 8, 1 Chronicles 19

== Sources ==
=== Commentaries on Samuel ===
- Auld, Graeme (2003). "1 & 2 Samuel". In James D. G. Dunn and John William Rogerson (ed.). Eerdmans Commentary on the Bible. Eerdmans. ISBN 9780802837110.
- Bergen, David T. (1996). 1, 2 Samuel. B&H Publishing Group. ISBN 9780805401073.
- Chapman, Stephen B. (2016). 1 Samuel as Christian Scripture: A Theological Commentary. Wm. B. Eerdmans Publishing Company. ISBN 978-1467445160.
- Collins, John J. (2014). "Chapter 14: 1 Samuel 12 – 2 Samuel 25". Introduction to the Hebrew Scriptures. Fortress Press. pp. 277–296. ISBN 978-1451469233.
- Evans, Paul (2018). Longman, Tremper (ed.). 1-2 Samuel. The Story of God Bible Commentary. Zondervan Academic. ISBN 978-0310490944.
- Gordon, Robert (1986). I & II Samuel, A Commentary. Paternoster Press. ISBN 9780310230229.
- Hertzberg, Hans Wilhelm (1964). I & II Samuel, A Commentary (trans. from German 2nd edition 1960 ed.). Westminster John Knox Press. p. 19. ISBN 978-0664223182.
- Morrison, Craig E. (2013). Berit Olam: 2 Samuel. Liturgical Press. ISBN 978-0814682913.
- Steinmann, Andrew (2017). 2 Samuel. Concordia commentary: a theological exposition of sacred scripture. Concordia Publishing House. ISBN 9780758650061.

=== General ===
- Breytenbach, Andries (2000). "Who Is Behind The Samuel Narrative?". In Johannes Cornelis de Moor and H.F. Van Rooy (ed.). Past, Present, Future: the Deuteronomistic History and the Prophets. Brill. ISBN 9789004118713.
- Coogan, Michael David (2007). Coogan, Michael David; Brettler, Marc Zvi; Newsom, Carol Ann; Perkins, Pheme (eds.). The New Oxford Annotated Bible with the Apocryphal/Deuterocanonical Books: New Revised Standard Version, Issue 48 (Augmented 3rd ed.). Oxford University Press. ISBN 978-0195288810.
- Fitzmyer, Joseph A. (2008). A Guide to the Dead Sea Scrolls and Related Literature. Grand Rapids, MI: William B. Eerdmans Publishing Company. ISBN 9780802862419.
- Halley, Henry H. (1965). Halley's Bible Handbook: an abbreviated Bible commentary (24th (revised) ed.). Zondervan Publishing House. ISBN 0-310-25720-4.
- Hayes, Christine (2015). Introduction to the Bible. Yale University Press. ISBN 978-0300188271.
- Jones, Gwilym H. (2007). "12. 1 and 2 Samuel". In Barton, John; Muddiman, John (eds.). The Oxford Bible Commentary (first (paperback) ed.). Oxford University Press. pp. 196–232. ISBN 978-0199277186.
- Klein, R.W. (2003). "Samuel, books of". In Bromiley, Geoffrey W (ed.). The International Standard Bible Encyclopedia. Eerdmans. ISBN 9780802837844.
- Knight, Douglas A (1995). "Chapter 4 Deuteronomy and the Deuteronomists". In James Luther Mays, David L. Petersen and Kent Harold Richards (ed.). Old Testament Interpretation. T&T Clark. ISBN 9780567292896.
- McKane, William (1993). "Samuel, Book of". In Metzger, Bruce M; Coogan, Michael D (eds.). The Oxford Companion to the Bible. Oxford University Press. pp. 409–413. ISBN 978-0195046458.
- Ulrich, Eugene, ed. (2010). The Biblical Qumran Scrolls: Transcriptions and Textual Variants. Brill.
- Würthwein, Ernst (1995). The Text of the Old Testament. Translated by Rhodes, Erroll F. Grand Rapids, MI: Wm. B. Eerdmans. ISBN 0-8028-0788-7.
