= 2 Samuel 8 =

Second Book of Samuel chapter

- ← chapter 7 chapter 9 →
- The pages containing the Books of Samuel (1 & 2 Samuel) Leningrad Codex (1008 CE).
- Book: First book of Samuel
- Hebrew Bible part: Nevi'im
- Order in the Hebrew part: 3
- Category: Former Prophets
- Christian Bible part: Old Testament
- Order in the Christian part: 10

2 Samuel 8 is the eighth chapter of the Second Book of Samuel in the Old Testament of the Christian Bible or the second part of Books of Samuel in the Hebrew Bible. Jewish tradition attributes the book to the prophet Samuel, with later additions by the prophets Gad and Nathan; modern scholarship, however, regards it as a compilation of independent texts dated to c. 630–540 BCE. This chapter contains the account of David's reign in Jerusalem. This is within a section comprising 2 Samuel 2–8 that deals with the period when David set up his kingdom.

== Text ==
This chapter was originally written in Biblical Hebrew. It is divided into 18 verses.

=== Textual witnesses ===
Some early manuscripts containing the text of this chapter in Biblical Hebrew are of the Masoretic Textual tradition, which includes the Codex Cairensis (895), Aleppo Codex (10th century), and Codex Leningradensis (1008). Fragments containing parts of this chapter in Hebrew were found among the Dead Sea Scrolls including 4Q51 (4QSam^{a}; 100–50 BCE) with extant verses 1–8.

Extant ancient manuscripts of a translation into Koine Greek known as the Septuagint (compiled in the last few centuries BCE) include Codex Vaticanus (B; $\mathfrak{G}$^{B}; 4th century) and Codex Alexandrinus (A; $\mathfrak{G}$^{A}; 5th century). (Note: The whole book of 2 Samuel is missing from the extant Codex Sinaiticus.)

== Places ==
- Aram
- Berothah
- Betah
- Damascus
- Edom
- Euphrates
- Hama
- Jerusalem
- Metheg-ammah
- Moab
- Syria
- Valley of Salt
- Zobah

== Analysis ==
This chapter catalogs David's victories (verses 1–14), arranged thematically rather than chronologically, and lists David's court officials (verses 15–18).

== David's victories (8:1–14) ==
This section can be divided into two sections: David's victories (verses 2–6) and David's handling of the plunder (verses 7–14), with the first verse serving as an overture to introduce the two verbs that guide the reading: David “strikes” ('n-k-h'; נָכָה nakah) his enemies and then "takes" ('l-q-kh'; לָקַח laqakh) plunder. Three interlocking pairs of refrains integrate the whole unit, which main theme is the ascent of David as a shepherd-king to the world stage, just as God promised to give David a great name ("the LORD gave victory to David wherever he went"; cf. 2 Samuel 7:9).

The structure of this section is as follows:

1. David's victories (8:1-6)

David strikes (n-k-h) the Philistines (8:1)
David strikes (n-k-h) the Moabites (8:2ab)

Refrain 1: The Moabites became servants to David, bearers of tribute (8:2c)

David strikes (n-k-h) Hadadezer (8:3–4)
David strikes (n-k-h) the Arameans (8:5)

Refrain 2: David establishes garrisons in foreign territory (8:6a)
Refrain 1: The Arameans became servants to David, bearers of tribute (8:6b)
Refrain 3: The Lord gave victory to David wherever he went (8:6c)

2. David and the plunder (8:7–14)

David takes (l-q-kh) gold from Hadadezer's servants and takes (l-q-kh) bronze from Hadadezer's town (8:7–8)
David receives tribute from King Toi (8:9–10)
David dedicates all the plunder to the Lord (8:11–12)
David defeats the Edomites (8:13)

Refrain 2: David establishes garrisons in foreign territory (8:14a)
Refrain 3: The Lord gave victory to David wherever he went (8:14b)

These verses, together with other passages (cf. 1 Samuel 30:1–31; 2 Samuel 5:17–25; 10:1–11:1; 12:26–31; 21:15–22) provide a list of David's victories, as shown below:

Enemies subdued by David
Defeated enemy	Bible verses
Amalekites	1 Samuel 30:1–31
Ammonites	2 Samuel 10:1–11:1; 12:26–31
Aram-Zobah (Hadadezer)	2 Samuel 8:3–10
Aram	2 Samuel 10:6–19
Edom	2 Samuel 8:13–14
Moab	2 Samuel 8:2
Philistines	2 Samuel 5:17–25; 8:1; 21:15–22

According to 2 Samuel 10:1–19 and this passage, David fought three successive battles against the Arameans. king Toi (or "Tou") of Hamath (which was on the Orontes River to the north of Zobah) heard about David's successes and sent his son to make an alliance with David, bringing expensive gifts. As a result of his conquests David took control over what is now 'Palestine' from the Philistines, with garrisons placed in Moab, Edom, and Ammon (which corresponds to modern Jordan), and also conquered Aramean states (corresponding to modern Syria and eastern Lebanon).

=== Verse 1 ===
After this David defeated the Philistines and subdued them, and David took Metheg-ammah out of the hand of the Philistines.

- "After this": from Hebrew "wayehî ’a-ḥă-rê-ḵên", "and-happened after this", indicating an unspecified interval of time since God's promise to David in the previous chapter.
- "Metheg-ammah": from Hebrew: "metheg ha-ammah", literally, "the Bridle of the Mother City", because in 2 Samuel 20:19 "ammah" refers to a "mother city" (Note: "Ammah" referring to "mother" (chief) city is supported by the Phoenician cognate "′m" for the same meaning.) also can be rendered as "the bridle of one cubit." or "the forearm bridle". The parallel text in 1 Chronicles 18:1 reads "Gath and its daughters (nearby villages)".

== David's court officials (8:15–18) ==
The list of David's court officials is not exactly identical with another version in 2 Samuel 20:23–26, which indicates the existence of several variants in archives over a period of time. The comparison is as follows:

David's officials (Officials only found in either list are in italics)
2 Samuel 8:15–18	2 Samuel 20:23–26
Joab, commander of the army	Joab, commander of the army
Jehoshaphat, royal historian	Benaiah, over the Cherethites and Pelethites
Zadok and Ahimelech (son of Abiathar), high priests	Adoram, in charge of forced labor
Seraiah, royal scribe	Jehoshaphat, royal historian
Benaiah, over the Cherethites and Pelethites	Sheva, royal scribe
David's sons, palace administrators	Zadok and Abiathar, high priests Ira, David's priest

Joab had been with David and had command of the army for a long time (cf 2 Samuel 2), whereas Jehoshaphat was still in office in the time of Solomon (1 Kings 4:3). Zadok and Abiathar shared the priesthood until David's death (1 Kings 2:26). The Cherethites and Pelethites were the royal bodyguard, under the command of Benaiah (cf. 1 Chronicles 18:17); they were David's most loyal soldiers, marching with David out of Jerusalem during Absalom's rebellion (2 Samuel 15:18), helping to chase the rebellious Sheba son of Bichri (2 Samuel 20:7), and guarding Solomon's anointing by Zadok the high priest as David's successor (1 Kings 1).

== See also ==
- Ahilud
- Ahitub
- Jehoiada
- Kingdom of Israel
- Zeruiah
- Related Bible parts: 2 Samuel 5, 2 Samuel 20, 1 Kings 1, 1 Chronicles 18, Psalm 60

== Sources ==
=== Commentaries on Samuel ===
- Auld, Graeme (2003). "1 & 2 Samuel". In James D. G. Dunn and John William Rogerson (ed.). Eerdmans Commentary on the Bible. Eerdmans. ISBN 9780802837110.
- Bergen, David T. (1996). 1, 2 Samuel. B&H Publishing Group. ISBN 9780805401073.
- Chapman, Stephen B. (2016). 1 Samuel as Christian Scripture: A Theological Commentary. Wm. B. Eerdmans Publishing Company. ISBN 978-1467445160.
- Collins, John J. (2014). "Chapter 14: 1 Samuel 12 – 2 Samuel 25". Introduction to the Hebrew Scriptures. Fortress Press. pp. 277–296. ISBN 978-1451469233.
- Evans, Paul (2018). Longman, Tremper (ed.). 1-2 Samuel. The Story of God Bible Commentary. Zondervan Academic. ISBN 978-0310490944.
- Gordon, Robert (1986). I & II Samuel, A Commentary. Paternoster Press. ISBN 9780310230229.
- Hertzberg, Hans Wilhelm (1964). I & II Samuel, A Commentary (trans. from German 2nd edition 1960 ed.). Westminster John Knox Press. p. 19. ISBN 978-0664223182.
- Morrison, Craig E. (2013). Berit Olam: 2 Samuel. Liturgical Press. ISBN 978-0814682913.
- Steinmann, Andrew (2017). 2 Samuel. Concordia commentary: a theological exposition of sacred scripture. Concordia Publishing House. ISBN 9780758650061.

=== General ===
- Breytenbach, Andries (2000). "Who Is Behind The Samuel Narrative?". In Johannes Cornelis de Moor and H.F. Van Rooy (ed.). Past, Present, Future: the Deuteronomistic History and the Prophets. Brill. ISBN 9789004118713.
- Coogan, Michael David (2007). Coogan, Michael David; Brettler, Marc Zvi; Newsom, Carol Ann; Perkins, Pheme (eds.). The New Oxford Annotated Bible with the Apocryphal/Deuterocanonical Books: New Revised Standard Version, Issue 48 (Augmented 3rd ed.). Oxford University Press. ISBN 978-0195288810.
- Fitzmyer, Joseph A. (2008). A Guide to the Dead Sea Scrolls and Related Literature. Grand Rapids, MI: William B. Eerdmans Publishing Company. ISBN 9780802862419.
- Halley, Henry H. (1965). Halley's Bible Handbook: an abbreviated Bible commentary (24th (revised) ed.). Zondervan Publishing House. ISBN 0-310-25720-4.
- Hayes, Christine (2015). Introduction to the Bible. Yale University Press. ISBN 978-0300188271.
- Jones, Gwilym H. (2007). "12. 1 and 2 Samuel". In Barton, John; Muddiman, John (eds.). The Oxford Bible Commentary (first (paperback) ed.). Oxford University Press. pp. 196–232. ISBN 978-0199277186.
- Klein, R.W. (2003). "Samuel, books of". In Bromiley, Geoffrey W (ed.). The International Standard Bible Encyclopedia. Eerdmans. ISBN 9780802837844.
- Knight, Douglas A (1995). "Chapter 4 Deuteronomy and the Deuteronomists". In James Luther Mays, David L. Petersen and Kent Harold Richards (ed.). Old Testament Interpretation. T&T Clark. ISBN 9780567292896.
- McKane, William (1993). "Samuel, Book of". In Metzger, Bruce M; Coogan, Michael D (eds.). The Oxford Companion to the Bible. Oxford University Press. pp. 409–413. ISBN 978-0195046458.
- Ulrich, Eugene, ed. (2010). The Biblical Qumran Scrolls: Transcriptions and Textual Variants. Brill.
- Würthwein, Ernst (1995). The Text of the Old Testament. Translated by Rhodes, Erroll F. Grand Rapids, MI: Wm. B. Eerdmans. ISBN 0-8028-0788-7.
