= 2 Samuel 9 =

Second Book of Samuel chapter

- ← chapter 8 chapter 10 →
- The pages containing the Books of Samuel (1 & 2 Samuel) Leningrad Codex (1008 CE).
- Book: First book of Samuel
- Hebrew Bible part: Nevi'im
- Order in the Hebrew part: 3
- Category: Former Prophets
- Christian Bible part: Old Testament
- Order in the Christian part: 10

2 Samuel 9 is the ninth chapter of the Second Book of Samuel in the Old Testament of the Christian Bible or the second part of Books of Samuel in the Hebrew Bible. Jewish tradition attributes the book to the prophet Samuel, with later additions by the prophets Gad and Nathan; modern scholarship, however, regards it as a compilation of independent texts dated to c. 630–540 BCE. This chapter contains the account of David's reign in Jerusalem. This chapter is part of a section covering 2 Samuel 9–20 and continuing to 1 Kings 1–2, which describes the power struggles among David's sons to succeed him, until the kingdom was firmly established in Solomon's hands (1 Kings 2:46).

== Text ==
This chapter was originally written in Biblical Hebrew. It is divided into 13 verses.

=== Textual witnesses ===
Some early manuscripts containing the text of this chapter in Biblical Hebrew are of the Masoretic Textual tradition, which includes the Codex Cairensis (895), Aleppo Codex (10th century), and Codex Leningradensis (1008). Fragments containing parts of this chapter in Hebrew were found among the Dead Sea Scrolls including 4Q51 (4QSam^{a}; 100–50 BCE) with extant verses 8–10.

Extant ancient manuscripts of a translation into Koine Greek known as the Septuagint (compiled in the last few centuries BCE) include Codex Vaticanus (B; $\mathfrak{G}$^{B}; 4th century) and Codex Alexandrinus (A; $\mathfrak{G}$^{A}; 5th century). (Note: The whole book of 2 Samuel is missing from the extant Codex Sinaiticus.)

== Analysis ==
The structure of this chapter is as follows:

- A. David's intention (9:1)
  - B. David speaks to Ziba (9:2–5)
    - C. Mephibosheth does obeisance (9:6)
      - D. David fulfills his covenant with Jonathan (9:7)
    - C'. Mephibosheth does obeisance (9:8)
  - B'. David speaks to Ziba (9:9–11)
- A'. David's intention is accomplished (9:12–13)

This chapter is connected with events concerning the house of Saul and the death of Ish-bosheth in 2 Samuel 2–4. Arguably, it is more strongly associated with the story of the Gibeonites' revenge in 2 Samuel 21:1–14, which should precede the accommodation of Mephibosheth at David's table.

== David inquires about the house of Saul (9:1–4) ==
The section begins with David asking about "showing kindness to the house of Saul for Jonathan's sake" (verse 1), which is based on his promises to Jonathan in their covenant before YHWH and his promise to Saul that he "would not cut off his descendants". The passage contains a flashback to a time early in David's reign (999 BCE, according to Christian scholar Andrew Steinmann), placed in this chapter in anticipation of the events in 1 Samuel 16 and 1 Samuel 19 concerning Ziba and Mephibosheth. David did not have much information about Saul's house since his escape from that house (c. 1015 BCE), whereas his last contact with Jonathan was at Horesh roughly one year after Mephibosheth's birth (c. 1013–1012 BCE). (Note: Mephibosheth was 5 years old when Jonathan died (2 Samuel 4:4; c. 1009 BCE), so Mephibosheth's birth was around 1014 BCE.) David's official knew about Saul's servant, Ziba, who had the information about Saul's descendants (verse 2). Ziba identified only Mephibosheth as the surviving member of the house of Saul because Saul's sons from concubines and the grandsons through his daughter Merab were not considered heirs to Saul's house.

=== Verse 1 ===
And David said, "Is there still anyone left of the house of Saul, that I may show him kindness for Jonathan's sake?"

- "Kindness" (חֶסֶד, ḥesed, 'lovingkindness'): in the sense of "covenantal faithfulness".

== David and Mephibosheth (9:5–13) ==
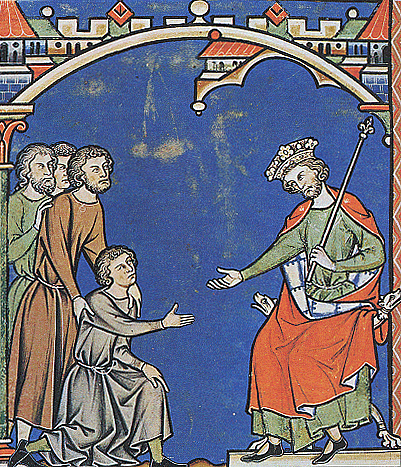
"Mephibosheth is brought to David by Ziba". An illustration in the Christian Morgan Bible (c. 1240s)

The presence of a member of Saul's household in David's own emphasizes that David was dealing honorably with Jonathan's descendant, with the text using the word chesed (IPA: [ˈħɛ.sed]; lit. 'lovingkindness') in verses 1, 3, and 7, to conform with the appeal 1 Samuel 20:14 records Jonathan making of God. David granted Mephibosheth, son of Jonathan, special patronage (verse 7), at royal expense (verse 11), his grandfather's property restored to him (verse 7), and arrangements were made for Ziba to act as estate manager to provide for the family (verse 10).

Saul's estate (verse 7) was royal property, so it should have belonged to David after he became king. However, at that time, some may still have belonged to remaining members of Saul's house, including his children of concubines, relatives, and his daughters' families. Merab, Saul's eldest daughter, was with her husband, Adriel, in Mehola, whereas Michal, Saul's other daughter, resided with her husband, King David, in Jerusalem. Therefore, some lands in other areas may have been maintained by caretakers, including Ziba. This could be how David's officials were able to trace Ziba. Now David could declare that all the estate should be given to Mephibosheth as Saul's sole legitimate heir.

=== Verse 5 ===
Then King David sent and brought him out of the house of Machir, the son of Ammiel, from Lo-debar.

- "Machir": a valued member in Saul's house who later showed kindness to David during Absalom's rebellion.

== See also ==
- David and Jonathan
- Micah son of Mephibosheth
- Paraplegia
- Related Bible parts: 1 Samuel 20, 1 Samuel 24, 2 Samuel 16, 2 Samuel 19

== Sources ==
=== Commentaries on Samuel ===
- Auld, Graeme (2003). "1 & 2 Samuel". In James D. G. Dunn and John William Rogerson (ed.). Eerdmans Commentary on the Bible. Eerdmans. ISBN 9780802837110.
- Bergen, David T. (1996). 1, 2 Samuel. B&H Publishing Group. ISBN 9780805401073.
- Chapman, Stephen B. (2016). 1 Samuel as Christian Scripture: A Theological Commentary. Wm. B. Eerdmans Publishing Company. ISBN 978-1467445160.
- Collins, John J. (2014). "Chapter 14: 1 Samuel 12 – 2 Samuel 25". Introduction to the Hebrew Scriptures. Fortress Press. pp. 277–296. ISBN 978-1451469233.
- Evans, Paul (2018). Longman, Tremper (ed.). 1-2 Samuel. The Story of God Bible Commentary. Zondervan Academic. ISBN 978-0310490944.
- Gordon, Robert (1986). I & II Samuel, A Commentary. Paternoster Press. ISBN 9780310230229.
- Hertzberg, Hans Wilhelm (1964). I & II Samuel, A Commentary (trans. from German 2nd edition 1960 ed.). Westminster John Knox Press. p. 19. ISBN 978-0664223182.
- Morrison, Craig E. (2013). Berit Olam: 2 Samuel. Liturgical Press. ISBN 978-0814682913.
- Steinmann, Andrew (2017). 2 Samuel. Concordia commentary: a theological exposition of sacred scripture. Concordia Publishing House. ISBN 9780758650061.

=== General ===
- Breytenbach, Andries (2000). "Who Is Behind The Samuel Narrative?". In Johannes Cornelis de Moor and H.F. Van Rooy (ed.). Past, Present, Future: the Deuteronomistic History and the Prophets. Brill. ISBN 9789004118713.
- Coogan, Michael David (2007). Coogan, Michael David; Brettler, Marc Zvi; Newsom, Carol Ann; Perkins, Pheme (eds.). The New Oxford Annotated Bible with the Apocryphal/Deuterocanonical Books: New Revised Standard Version, Issue 48 (Augmented 3rd ed.). Oxford University Press. ISBN 978-0195288810.
- Fitzmyer, Joseph A. (2008). A Guide to the Dead Sea Scrolls and Related Literature. Grand Rapids, MI: William B. Eerdmans Publishing Company. ISBN 9780802862419.
- Halley, Henry H. (1965). Halley's Bible Handbook: an abbreviated Bible commentary (24th (revised) ed.). Zondervan Publishing House. ISBN 0-310-25720-4.
- Hayes, Christine (2015). Introduction to the Bible. Yale University Press. ISBN 978-0300188271.
- Jones, Gwilym H. (2007). "12. 1 and 2 Samuel". In Barton, John; Muddiman, John (eds.). The Oxford Bible Commentary (first (paperback) ed.). Oxford University Press. pp. 196–232. ISBN 978-0199277186.
- Klein, R.W. (2003). "Samuel, books of". In Bromiley, Geoffrey W (ed.). The International Standard Bible Encyclopedia. Eerdmans. ISBN 9780802837844.
- Knight, Douglas A (1995). "Chapter 4 Deuteronomy and the Deuteronomists". In James Luther Mays, David L. Petersen and Kent Harold Richards (ed.). Old Testament Interpretation. T&T Clark. ISBN 9780567292896.
- McKane, William (1993). "Samuel, Book of". In Metzger, Bruce M; Coogan, Michael D (eds.). The Oxford Companion to the Bible. Oxford University Press. pp. 409–413. ISBN 978-0195046458.
- Ulrich, Eugene, ed. (2010). The Biblical Qumran Scrolls: Transcriptions and Textual Variants. Brill.
- Würthwein, Ernst (1995). The Text of the Old Testament. Translated by Rhodes, Erroll F. Grand Rapids, MI: Wm. B. Eerdmans. ISBN 0-8028-0788-7.
