= 2 Samuel 7 =

Second Book of Samuel chapter

- ← chapter 6 chapter 8 →
- The pages containing the Books of Samuel (1 & 2 Samuel) Leningrad Codex (1008 CE).
- Book: First book of Samuel
- Hebrew Bible part: Nevi'im
- Order in the Hebrew part: 3
- Category: Former Prophets
- Christian Bible part: Old Testament
- Order in the Christian part: 10

2 Samuel 7 is the seventh chapter of the Second Book of Samuel in the Old Testament of the Christian Bible or the second part of Books of Samuel in the Hebrew Bible. Jewish tradition attributes the book to the prophet Samuel, with later additions by the prophets Gad and Nathan; modern scholarship, however, regards it as a compilation of independent texts dated to c. 630–540 BCE. This chapter contains the account of David's reign in Jerusalem. This chapter comes within a section of the Deuteronomistic history comprising 2 Samuel 2–8, which deals with the period when David set up his kingdom.

== Text ==
This chapter was originally written in Biblical Hebrew. It is divided into 29 verses. Some early biblical manuscripts containing the text of this chapter in Biblical Hebrew are of the Masoretic Textual tradition, which includes the Codex Cairensis (895), Aleppo Codex (10th century), and Codex Leningradensis (1008). Fragments containing parts of this chapter in Hebrew were found among the Dead Sea Scrolls including 4Q51 (4QSam^{a}; 100–50 BCE) with extant verses 6–7 and 22–29.

Extant ancient manuscripts of a translation into Koine Greek known as the Septuagint (compiled in the last few centuries BCE) include Codex Vaticanus (B; $\mathfrak{G}$^{B}; 4th century) and Codex Alexandrinus (A; $\mathfrak{G}$^{A}; 5th century). (Note: The whole book of 2 Samuel is missing from the extant Codex Sinaiticus.)

== Analysis ==
This chapter addresses two important issues: building a temple and succession to David's throne; it introduces succession narratives in 2 Samuel 9–10 and 1 Kings 1–2. It is one of the most important sections in the Hebrew Bible (or Old Testament) and has been the subject of intense research.

There are three scenes in this chapter:

1. David and Nathan: David proposes to build a "house" for the Ark of the Covenant (7:1–3).
2. Nathan and God: the divine oracle:
  1. God, who redeemed Israel, decides he wants his house built (7:4–7).
  2. God will build a house for David (7:8–17).
3. David and God: David's response:
  1. David praises God's redemptive acts (7:18–24).
  2. David's prayer (7:25–29).

The second and third scenes run in parallel, with the first part of each scene recalling God's redemptive acts—specifically the Exodus from Egypt—and the second part, introduced with wě‘attâ (Biblical Hebrew: וְעַתָּה), which can be translated as "and now" or "now therefore"—indicating a consequence based on the premise established in the first part.

== Oracles regarding the House for God and House of David (7:1–17) ==
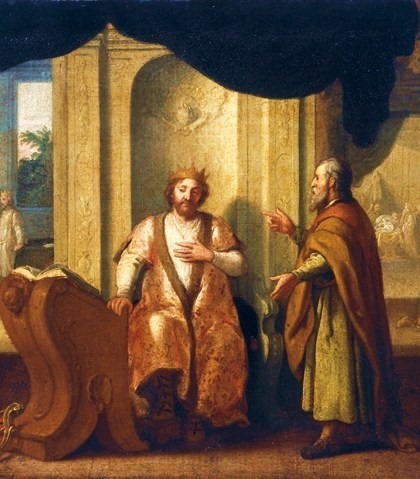
King David and Nathan the prophet (right), by Matthias Scheits

Verses 1–17 appear to be one unit, though it contains two separate oracles concerning two different issues:

1. The appropriateness of constructing a temple (verses 1–7).
2. The succession to David's throne (verses 8–16).

=== Sectional summary ===
David consults Nathan, a court prophet and his advisor, about his intention to build a temple to house the Ark of the Covenant; similar divine consultations for building temples are found in extra-biblical parallels, such as in the Egyptian Königsnovelle (lit. 'royal drama') genre. Nathan then conveys the first oracle of YHWH (verses 5 and 7): that David is prohibited from building a temple for YHWH in Jerusalem. The report is also recorded in 1 Chronicles 22:8 and 28:3 and in 1 Kings 5:17. Nathan later endorses Solomon, a son of David, as David's successor (1 Kings 1–2) and the constructor of the First Temple in Jerusalem.

The second oracle (verses 8–16) focuses on the issue of succession to David's throne. It connects to the first oracle through the same historical context (verses 1–3) and the use of the word bayit (בַּיִת, báyit, 'house') in two distinct ways: David was not permitted to build a "house" for YHWH (verses 5, 6, and 13), but YHWH would establish a "house", or dynasty, for David (verses 11, 16), referring to the house of David.

The core message of the second oracle is as follows: David had been called by God (verse 9) and protected against his enemies and made into a great name (verse 10); God would raise up his son to succeed him and would establish his kingdom (verse 12), and he would enjoy the status of God's son (verse 14). Additional elements are God's care of the people of Israel (verses 10–11), the eternity of David's kingdom (verses 13 and 16), and the contrast between David and Saul (verses 14b–15). The combined theme of David's greatness and the certainty of succession can be found in between this oracle and other texts, such as Psalm 89 by Ethan the Ezrahite.

In 1 Kings 5:3–4, Solomon explained that while David was given "rest" from his enemies, it was not to the higher degree of "rest" given to Solomon, with neither "adversary nor misfortune" to impede the Temple's construction, as the fulfillment of God's promise to "give Israel rest from its adversaries", to "fight Israel's battles", and to "bestow on them the Promised Land".

=== Verses 1–2 ===
^{1}Now it came to pass when the king was dwelling in his house, and the LORD had given him rest from all his enemies all around, ^{2} that the king said to Nathan the prophet, "See now, I dwell in a house of cedar, but the Ark of God dwells inside tent curtains."

- Nathan the prophet, first mentioned here, played important roles in three key moments of David's reign in addition to serving as a prophetic advisor for David (2 Chronicles 29:25) and as a biographer of David and Solomon:
1. Via his prophecy in this chapter about the House of God and House of David.
2. His later conveyance of God's rebuke for David's adultery with Bathsheba (2 Samuel 12).
3. His prompting of the aging David to declare Solomon as his successor (1 Kings 1).
- The construction of David's house using cedar logs supplied by Hiram I, the sitting king of Tyre, was also recounted in 2 Samuel 5:9–12.
- When period in his reign David formed his resolution to build the Temple is unknown.

=== Verse 14 ===
[YHWH says]: "I will be his father, and he shall be my son. If he commit[s] iniquity, I will chasten him with the rod of men, and with the stripes of the children of men."

- "Stripes": namely, blows (RJPS and NJKV) or strokes.

=== Verse 16 ===
[YHWH says] "And your house and your kingdom shall be established forever before you. Your throne shall be established forever."

- "Before you": The Septuagint reads "before me", as does the portion from Hebrew scholar Everett Fox's Early Prophets.

== The prayer of David (7:18–29) ==
The second half of the chapter contains David's prayer, which could be connected with bringing the Ark to Jerusalem (6:1–19) rather than with the dynastic oracle in 7:1–7. In addition there were allusions to God's promise and its eternal nature (verses 22 and 28–29), God's redemption of his people from Egypt (verses 23–24), and several Deuteronomistic themes (verses 22b–26).

=== Verse 23 ===
And who is like Your people, like Israel, the one nation on the earth whom God went to redeem for Himself as a people, to make for Himself a name—and to do for Yourself great and awesome deeds for Your land—before Your people whom You redeemed for Yourself from Egypt, the nations, and their gods?

- "For Your land" in the Masoretic Text; the Septuagint's translation reads "to cast you out" (Ancient Greek: τοῦ ἐκβαλεῖν σε, romanized: tou ekbalein se), as in 1 Chronicles 17:21.

== See also ==
- Ark of the Covenant
- Children of Israel
- Saul
- Solomon's Temple
- Tabernacle
- Tribes of Israel
- United Monarchy of Israel
- Related Bible parts: 2 Samuel 12, 1 Kings 1, 1 Chronicles 29, 2 Chronicles 9, Psalm 89

== Sources ==
=== Commentaries on Samuel ===
- Auld, Graeme (2003). "1 & 2 Samuel". In James D. G. Dunn and John William Rogerson (ed.). Eerdmans Commentary on the Bible. Eerdmans. ISBN 9780802837110.
- Bergen, David T. (1996). 1, 2 Samuel. B&H Publishing Group. ISBN 9780805401073.
- Chapman, Stephen B. (2016). 1 Samuel as Christian Scripture: A Theological Commentary. Wm. B. Eerdmans Publishing Company. ISBN 978-1467445160.
- Collins, John J. (2014). "Chapter 14: 1 Samuel 12 – 2 Samuel 25". Introduction to the Hebrew Scriptures. Fortress Press. pp. 277–296. ISBN 978-1451469233.
- Evans, Paul (2018). Longman, Tremper (ed.). 1-2 Samuel. The Story of God Bible Commentary. Zondervan Academic. ISBN 978-0310490944.
- Gordon, Robert (1986). I & II Samuel, A Commentary. Paternoster Press. ISBN 9780310230229.
- Hertzberg, Hans Wilhelm (1964). I & II Samuel, A Commentary (trans. from German 2nd edition 1960 ed.). Westminster John Knox Press. p. 19. ISBN 978-0664223182.
- Morrison, Craig E. (2013). Berit Olam: 2 Samuel. Liturgical Press. ISBN 978-0814682913.
- Steinmann, Andrew (2017). 2 Samuel. Concordia commentary: a theological exposition of sacred scripture. Concordia Publishing House. ISBN 9780758650061.

=== General ===
- Breytenbach, Andries (2000). "Who Is Behind The Samuel Narrative?". In Johannes Cornelis de Moor and H.F. Van Rooy (ed.). Past, Present, Future: the Deuteronomistic History and the Prophets. Brill. ISBN 9789004118713.
- Coogan, Michael David (2007). Coogan, Michael David; Brettler, Marc Zvi; Newsom, Carol Ann; Perkins, Pheme (eds.). The New Oxford Annotated Bible with the Apocryphal/Deuterocanonical Books: New Revised Standard Version, Issue 48 (Augmented 3rd ed.). Oxford University Press. ISBN 978-0195288810.
- Fitzmyer, Joseph A. (2008). A Guide to the Dead Sea Scrolls and Related Literature. Grand Rapids, MI: William B. Eerdmans Publishing Company. ISBN 9780802862419.
- Halley, Henry H. (1965). Halley's Bible Handbook: an abbreviated Bible commentary (24th (revised) ed.). Zondervan Publishing House. ISBN 0-310-25720-4.
- Hayes, Christine (2015). Introduction to the Bible. Yale University Press. ISBN 978-0300188271.
- Jones, Gwilym H. (2007). "12. 1 and 2 Samuel". In Barton, John; Muddiman, John (eds.). The Oxford Bible Commentary (first (paperback) ed.). Oxford University Press. pp. 196–232. ISBN 978-0199277186.
- Klein, R.W. (2003). "Samuel, books of". In Bromiley, Geoffrey W (ed.). The International Standard Bible Encyclopedia. Eerdmans. ISBN 9780802837844.
- Knight, Douglas A (1995). "Chapter 4 Deuteronomy and the Deuteronomists". In James Luther Mays, David L. Petersen and Kent Harold Richards (ed.). Old Testament Interpretation. T&T Clark. ISBN 9780567292896.
- McKane, William (1993). "Samuel, Book of". In Metzger, Bruce M; Coogan, Michael D (eds.). The Oxford Companion to the Bible. Oxford University Press. pp. 409–413. ISBN 978-0195046458.
- Ulrich, Eugene, ed. (2010). The Biblical Qumran Scrolls: Transcriptions and Textual Variants. Brill.
- Würthwein, Ernst (1995). The Text of the Old Testament. Translated by Rhodes, Erroll F. Grand Rapids, MI: Wm. B. Eerdmans. ISBN 0-8028-0788-7.
