= 2 Samuel 19 =

Second Book of Samuel chapter

- ← chapter 18 chapter 20 →
- The pages containing the Books of Samuel (1 & 2 Samuel) Leningrad Codex (1008 CE).
- Book: First book of Samuel
- Hebrew Bible part: Nevi'im
- Order in the Hebrew part: 3
- Category: Former Prophets
- Christian Bible part: Old Testament
- Order in the Christian part: 10

2 Samuel 19 is the nineteenth chapter of the Second Book of Samuel in the Old Testament of the Christian Bible or the second part of Books of Samuel in the Hebrew Bible. According to Jewish tradition the book was attributed to the prophet Samuel, with additions by the prophets Gad and Nathan, but modern scholars view it as a composition of a number of independent texts of various ages from c. 630–540 BCE. This chapter contains the account of David's reign in Jerusalem. This is within a section comprising 2 Samuel 9–20 and continued to 1 Kings 1–2 which deal with the power struggles among David's sons to succeed David's throne until 'the kingdom was established in the hand of Solomon' (1 Kings 2:46).

== Text ==
This chapter was originally written in the Hebrew language. It is divided into 43 verses.

=== Textual witnesses ===
Some early manuscripts containing the text of this chapter in Hebrew are of the Masoretic Text tradition, which includes the Codex Cairensis (895), Aleppo Codex (10th century), and Codex Leningradensis (1008). Fragments containing parts of this chapter in Hebrew were found among the Dead Sea Scrolls including 4Q51 (4QSam^{a}; 100–50 BCE) with extant verses 6–12, 14–16, 25, 27–29, 38.

Extant ancient manuscripts of a translation into Koine Greek known as the Septuagint (originally was made in the last few centuries BCE) include Codex Vaticanus (B; $\mathfrak{G}$^{B}; 4th century) and Codex Alexandrinus (A; $\mathfrak{G}$^{A}; 5th century). (Note: The whole book of 2 Samuel is missing from the extant Codex Sinaiticus.)

== Analysis ==
The story of Absalom's rebellion can be observed as five consecutive episodes:

A. David's flight from Jerusalem (15:13–16:14)

B. The victorious Absalom and his counselors (16:15–17:14)

C. David reaches Mahanaim (17:15–29)

B'. The rebellion is crushed and Absalom is executed (18:1–19:8abc)

A'. David's reentry into Jerusalem (19:8d–20:3)

God's role seems to be understated in the whole events, but is disclosed by a seemingly insignificant detail: 'the crossing of the Jordan river'. The Hebrew root word' 'br, "to cross" (in various nominal and verbal forms) is used more than 30 times in these chapters (compared to 20 times in the rest of 2 Samuel) to report David's flight from Jerusalem, his crossing of the Jordan river, and his reentry into Jerusalem. In 2 Samuel 17:16, stating that David should cross the Jordan (17:16), the verb 'br is even reinforced by a 'Hebrew infinitive absolute' to mark this critical moment: "king David is about to cross out of the land of Israel." David's future was in doubt until it was stated that God had rendered foolish Ahithophel's good counsel to Absalom (2 Samuel 17:14), thus granting David's prayer (15:31), and saving David from Absalom's further actions. Once Absalom was defeated, David's crossing back over the Jordan echoes the Israelites' first crossing over the Jordan under Joshua's leadership (Joshua 1–4):

1. Both David and Joshua crossed the Jordan and came to Gilgal (Joshua 4:19; 2 Samuel 19:40).
2. Both were assisted by women who hid the good spies to save the mission: Rahab in Joshua 2:1–21 and the woman of Bahurim in 2 Samuel 17:20.
3. Both episodes include the Ark of the Covenant, although David prevented the ark from crossing out of the land of Israel (15:25; referring to areas west of Jordan river).

Here God's role is not as explicit as during Joshua's crossing, but the signs are clear that God was with David, just as with Joshua.

== Joab reproved David (19:1–8) ==
With his prolonged mourning for Absalom David placed his personal grief over his responsibility towards his troops and supporters who had helped him fighting. Joab took initiatives to rebuke David, warning about another possible rebellion (verse 7). Joab's harsh words managed to wake the king from his depression and to see him sitting on his throne watching his troops marching past.

=== Verse 8 ===
Then the king arose and took his seat in the gate.
And the people were all told, "Behold, the king is sitting in the gate."
And all the people came before the king.
Now Israel had fled every man to his own home.

- "Israel": compared to 2 Samuel 18:16–17, this may refer to the supporters of Absalom (cf. also 2 Samuel 18:6–7).
- "Every man to his own home": Hebrew: “each to his tent.”

== David restored as king (19:9–33) ==
'Bringing the king back' to his residence in Jerusalem was a prestigious privilege to the king's supporters. Despite some dissatisfaction of David's previous management, the people of Israel, former supporters of Absalom, were ready to transfer their allegiance again to the king, but the people of Judah, David's own tribe was not doing anything as such, perhaps because Absalom's rebellion had started in Hebron, in Judah's territory. Therefore, David sent two priests, Zadok and Abiathar (cf. 2 Samuel 15:24–29) from Jerusalem to the elders of Judah with two messages:

1. a reminder of David's Judahite descent
2. David's intention to appoint Amasa to replace Joab as commander of his army.

Agreeing on the messages, the Judahites went to Gilgal to guard David's crossing of the Jordan River.

During David's return journey to Jerusalem there were three meetings which correspond to those during his departure from the city (15:9–16:13).

His first encounter was with Shimei, a Benjaminite from the house of Saul, who previously cursed David (2 Samuel 16:5–13), now pleaded with the king to forget his past actions, even added that he made efforts as the first of the 'house of Joseph' (referring to the 'northerner', that is, tribes of Israel outside Judah) to meet him. David, as customary on coronation day, showed magnanimity by swearing an oath not to kill Shimei, refusing the advice of the vengeful sons of Zeruiah to punish (cf. 16:9), even dismissed Abishai as an 'adversary' (Hebrew: satan). Despite his oath, David did not forget or forgive Shimei's insults so he commanded Solomon to deal with Shimei after David's death (1 Kings 2:8–9).

The second meeting was with Ziba, who had rushed down to the Jordan at the same time as Shimei with a group of people to assist the king's household to cross. The conversation with Mephibosheth (verses 24–30) was inserted here, because of the issue related to him and Ziba; it more likely happened near Jerusalem, after David's conversation with Barzillai in Transjordan. Mephiposheth was unkempt when coming to David, intentionally to demonstrate his grief for David's departure, and pleaded innocence, claiming that he had been deceived by Ziba (cf. 16:1–4), referring David as an 'angel of God' (cf. 2 Samuel 14:17, 20) as he recounted David's previous favors to him. David replied, curtly and to the point, by dividing Saul's territories between Ziba and Mephibosheth.

The third meeting was with Barzillai who had made provision for the king and his troops (2 Samuel 17:27), and now David wished to recompense by giving him a place in the court (verses 31–40). Barzillai's old age could no longer enjoy the pleasures of the Court, so he only requested his home and family grave, while handed over his servant (or 'son' according to some Septuagint manuscripts), Chimham, to accompany David. David would not forget Barzillai's kindness: he blessed Barzillai (verses 38b—39), and later commended him to Solomon (1 Kings 2:26).

The conflict between north and south in verses 41–43 is a continuation of verses 8–13, where the tribes of Israel outside Judah were thinking of 'bringing the king back' before the Judahites, but then the Judahites came first to guard the king crossing the Jordan River. The northern tribes felt excluded, especially as the tribe of Judah claimed priority because David was their kinsman, but the northern tribes claimed to form the larger part of his kingdom ('ten shares' to two) and to be the first to mention bringing back the king. These verses, left without a resolution, prepare for the revolt of 2 Samuel 20 and the ultimate division of the kingdom in 1 Kings 12.

== See also ==
- Abiathar
- Abishai
- Absalom
- Amasa
- Bahurim
- Barzillai
- Chimham
- City gate
- Gera
- Gileadite
- Gilgal
- Gittite
- Ittai
- Jerusalem
- Joab
- Jordan River
- King David's Warriors
- Kingdom of Israel
- Kohen
- Mahanaim
- Rogelim
- Saul
- Shimei
- Tribe of Benjamin
- Tribe of Joseph
- Tribe of Judah
- Zadok
- Zeruiah
- Related Bible parts: 2 Samuel 16, 2 Samuel 18

== Sources ==
=== Commentaries on Samuel ===
- Auld, Graeme (2003). "1 & 2 Samuel". In James D. G. Dunn and John William Rogerson (ed.). Eerdmans Commentary on the Bible. Eerdmans. ISBN 9780802837110.
- Bergen, David T. (1996). 1, 2 Samuel. B&H Publishing Group. ISBN 9780805401073.
- Chapman, Stephen B. (2016). 1 Samuel as Christian Scripture: A Theological Commentary. Wm. B. Eerdmans Publishing Company. ISBN 978-1467445160.
- Collins, John J. (2014). "Chapter 14: 1 Samuel 12 – 2 Samuel 25". Introduction to the Hebrew Scriptures. Fortress Press. pp. 277–296. ISBN 978-1451469233.
- Evans, Paul (2018). Longman, Tremper (ed.). 1-2 Samuel. The Story of God Bible Commentary. Zondervan Academic. ISBN 978-0310490944.
- Gordon, Robert (1986). I & II Samuel, A Commentary. Paternoster Press. ISBN 9780310230229.
- Hertzberg, Hans Wilhelm (1964). I & II Samuel, A Commentary (trans. from German 2nd edition 1960 ed.). Westminster John Knox Press. p. 19. ISBN 978-0664223182.
- Morrison, Craig E. (2013). Berit Olam: 2 Samuel. Liturgical Press. ISBN 978-0814682913.
- Steinmann, Andrew (2017). 2 Samuel. Concordia commentary: a theological exposition of sacred scripture. Concordia Publishing House. ISBN 9780758650061.

=== General ===
- Breytenbach, Andries (2000). "Who Is Behind The Samuel Narrative?". In Johannes Cornelis de Moor and H.F. Van Rooy (ed.). Past, Present, Future: the Deuteronomistic History and the Prophets. Brill. ISBN 9789004118713.
- Coogan, Michael David (2007). Coogan, Michael David; Brettler, Marc Zvi; Newsom, Carol Ann; Perkins, Pheme (eds.). The New Oxford Annotated Bible with the Apocryphal/Deuterocanonical Books: New Revised Standard Version, Issue 48 (Augmented 3rd ed.). Oxford University Press. ISBN 978-0195288810.
- Fitzmyer, Joseph A. (2008). A Guide to the Dead Sea Scrolls and Related Literature. Grand Rapids, MI: William B. Eerdmans Publishing Company. ISBN 9780802862419.
- Halley, Henry H. (1965). Halley's Bible Handbook: an abbreviated Bible commentary (24th (revised) ed.). Zondervan Publishing House. ISBN 0-310-25720-4.
- Hayes, Christine (2015). Introduction to the Bible. Yale University Press. ISBN 978-0300188271.
- Jones, Gwilym H. (2007). "12. 1 and 2 Samuel". In Barton, John; Muddiman, John (eds.). The Oxford Bible Commentary (first (paperback) ed.). Oxford University Press. pp. 196–232. ISBN 978-0199277186.
- Klein, R.W. (2003). "Samuel, books of". In Bromiley, Geoffrey W (ed.). The International Standard Bible Encyclopedia. Eerdmans. ISBN 9780802837844.
- Knight, Douglas A (1995). "Chapter 4 Deuteronomy and the Deuteronomists". In James Luther Mays, David L. Petersen and Kent Harold Richards (ed.). Old Testament Interpretation. T&T Clark. ISBN 9780567292896.
- McKane, William (1993). "Samuel, Book of". In Metzger, Bruce M; Coogan, Michael D (eds.). The Oxford Companion to the Bible. Oxford University Press. pp. 409–413. ISBN 978-0195046458.
- Ulrich, Eugene, ed. (2010). The Biblical Qumran Scrolls: Transcriptions and Textual Variants. Brill.
- Würthwein, Ernst (1995). The Text of the Old Testament. Translated by Rhodes, Erroll F. Grand Rapids, MI: Wm. B. Eerdmans. ISBN 0-8028-0788-7.
