= 2 Samuel 20 =

Second Book of Samuel chapter

- ← chapter 19 chapter 21 →
- The pages containing the Books of Samuel (1 & 2 Samuel) Leningrad Codex (1008 CE).
- Book: First book of Samuel
- Hebrew Bible part: Nevi'im
- Order in the Hebrew part: 3
- Category: Former Prophets
- Christian Bible part: Old Testament
- Order in the Christian part: 10

2 Samuel 20 is the twentieth chapter of the Second Book of Samuel in the Old Testament of the Christian Bible or the second part of Books of Samuel in the Hebrew Bible. According to Jewish tradition the book was attributed to the prophet Samuel, with additions by the prophets Gad and Nathan, but modern scholars view it as a composition of a number of independent texts of various ages from c. 630–540 BCE. This chapter contains the account of David's reign in Jerusalem. This is within a section comprising 2 Samuel 9–20 and continued to 1 Kings 1–2 which deal with the power struggles among David's sons to succeed David's throne until 'the kingdom was established in the hand of Solomon' (1 Kings 2:46).

== Text ==
This chapter was originally written in the Hebrew language. It is divided into 26 verses.

=== Textual witnesses ===
Some early manuscripts containing the text of this chapter in Hebrew are of the Masoretic Text tradition, which includes the Codex Cairensis (895), Aleppo Codex (10th century), and Codex Leningradensis (1008). Fragments containing parts of this chapter in Hebrew were found among the Dead Sea Scrolls including 1Q7 (1QSam; 50 BCE) with extant verses 6–10 and 4Q51 (4QSam^{a}; 100–50 BCE) with extant verses 1–2, 4, 9–14, 19, 21–25.

Extant ancient manuscripts of a translation into Koine Greek known as the Septuagint (originally was made in the last few centuries BCE) include Codex Vaticanus (B; $\mathfrak{G}$^{B}; 4th century) and Codex Alexandrinus (A; $\mathfrak{G}$^{A}; 5th century). (Note: The whole book of 2 Samuel is missing from the extant Codex Sinaiticus.)

=== Old Testament references ===
- 2 Samuel 20:23–26: 2 Samuel 8:15–18

== Analysis ==
Verses 1–3 of this chapter conclude the account of Absalom's rebellion with David safely back in his residence in Jerusalem:

== Rebellion of Sheba (20:1–22) ==
The discontent of the northern tribes recorded at the end of the previous chapter led to another rebellion, this time under Sheba, 'the son of Bichri, a Benjaminite', and a representative of the Saulide camp (cf. Bechorath in 1 Samuel 9:1). Although verse 2 suggests that 'all Israel' (the tribes other than Judah) left David and followed Sheba, verse 14 shows that only the Bichrites were the active rebels, but the significance of this group must not be overlooked. David perceived in verse 6 that this dissent was potentially more harmful than Absalom's rebellion, because it endangered the structure of the kingdom. Significantly Sheba's rallying cry (verse 1) was repeated when the kingdom of Israel was really divided after the death of Solomon (1 Kings 12:16).

Once David had settled in Jerusalem and made arrangements for his ten concubines, whom he left behind (verse 3), he turned his focus to the dissension. The newly appointed commander, Amasa (2 Samuel 19:13), was given three days to rally a force, but did not do as requested. Abishai was immediately put in charge of the army, but Joab who still had 'men' under his command (verse 7) took the lead to pursue Sheba. When Amasa met them at Gibeon, Joab pretended to kiss Amasa by pulling his beard to kiss him, but used a hidden short sword in his girdle to kill Amasa. Now Joab unquestionably became the leader of the army (his brother Abishai was no longer mentioned after verse 10) and the pursuit reached Abel of Beth-maacah in the north, near Dan, where Sheba went into. During the siege a 'wise woman' spoke to Joab from the rampart, offering a plan to save Abel-beth-maachah, a city which had a reputation for wisdom (verse 18) and considered a 'mother city' in Israel (verse 19), by beheading Sheba and throwing his severed head to Joab. With this, the rebellion ended, all people went home to their own cities as Joab returned to Jerusalem to report to David.

There are obvious links between the appearance of the wise woman of Abel and that of Tekoa in 2 Samuel 14:

1. Both women spoke to Joab
2. the 'heritage of the LORD' became an issue in both (verse 19; cf. 2 Samuel 14:16).

=== Verse 8 ===
Then the king arose and took his seat in the gate.
And the people were all told, "Behold, the king is sitting in the gate."
And all the people came before the king.
Now Israel had fled every man to his own home.

- "Israel": comparing to 2 Samuel 18:16–17 this may refer to the supporters of Absalom (cf. 2 Samuel 18:6–7).
- "Every man to his own home": Hebrew: “each to his tent.”

== David's court officials (20:23–26) ==
The chapter concludes with another list of David's court officials not exactly identical to the previous list in 2 Samuel 8:15-18. The comparison is as follows:

David's officials (Officials only found in either list are in italics)
2 Samuel 8:15–18	2 Samuel 20:23–26
Joab, commander of the army	Joab, commander of the army
Jehoshaphat, royal historian	Benaiah, over the Cherethites and Pelethites
Zadok and Ahimelech (son of Abiathar), high priests	Adoram, in charge of forced labor
Seraiah, royal scribe	Jehoshaphat, royal historian
Benaiah, over the Cherethites and Pelethites	Sheva, royal scribe
David's sons, palace administrators	Zadok and Abiathar, high priests Ira, David's priest

Joab remained the established commander of the army, and Benaiah remained in charge of the Cherethites and Pelethites. Adoram (written as "Adoniram" in 1 Kings 4:6), not mentioned in the previous list, was in charge of forced labor, which was established in the latter part of David's reign. All the other names are identical with those in the previous list, except Ira, who replaces David's sons at 2 Samuel 8:18 and was called 'the Jairite', probably denoting his origin from the village of Jair (Numbers 32:41; Deuteronomy 3:14).

== See also ==
- Abishai
- Absalom
- Ahilud
- Amasa
- Belial
- Bichri
- City gate
- Concubine
- Gibeon
- Jairite
- Jehoiada
- Jerusalem
- Jesse
- Joab
- Jordan River
- Kingdom of Israel
- Kohen
- Mount Ephraim
- Saul
- Shofar
- Tribe of Benjamin
- Tribe of Joseph
- Tribe of Judah
- Widow
- Zadok
- Zeruiah
- Related Bible parts: 2 Samuel 8, 2 Samuel 14, 2 Samuel 19, 1 Kings 12

== Sources ==
=== Commentaries on Samuel ===
- Auld, Graeme (2003). "1 & 2 Samuel". In James D. G. Dunn and John William Rogerson (ed.). Eerdmans Commentary on the Bible. Eerdmans. ISBN 9780802837110.
- Bergen, David T. (1996). 1, 2 Samuel. B&H Publishing Group. ISBN 9780805401073.
- Chapman, Stephen B. (2016). 1 Samuel as Christian Scripture: A Theological Commentary. Wm. B. Eerdmans Publishing Company. ISBN 978-1467445160.
- Collins, John J. (2014). "Chapter 14: 1 Samuel 12 – 2 Samuel 25". Introduction to the Hebrew Scriptures. Fortress Press. pp. 277–296. ISBN 978-1451469233.
- Evans, Paul (2018). Longman, Tremper (ed.). 1-2 Samuel. The Story of God Bible Commentary. Zondervan Academic. ISBN 978-0310490944.
- Gordon, Robert (1986). I & II Samuel, A Commentary. Paternoster Press. ISBN 9780310230229.
- Hertzberg, Hans Wilhelm (1964). I & II Samuel, A Commentary (trans. from German 2nd edition 1960 ed.). Westminster John Knox Press. p. 19. ISBN 978-0664223182.
- Morrison, Craig E. (2013). Berit Olam: 2 Samuel. Liturgical Press. ISBN 978-0814682913.
- Steinmann, Andrew (2017). 2 Samuel. Concordia commentary: a theological exposition of sacred scripture. Concordia Publishing House. ISBN 9780758650061.

=== General ===
- Breytenbach, Andries (2000). "Who Is Behind The Samuel Narrative?". In Johannes Cornelis de Moor and H.F. Van Rooy (ed.). Past, Present, Future: the Deuteronomistic History and the Prophets. Brill. ISBN 9789004118713.
- Coogan, Michael David (2007). Coogan, Michael David; Brettler, Marc Zvi; Newsom, Carol Ann; Perkins, Pheme (eds.). The New Oxford Annotated Bible with the Apocryphal/Deuterocanonical Books: New Revised Standard Version, Issue 48 (Augmented 3rd ed.). Oxford University Press. ISBN 978-0195288810.
- Fitzmyer, Joseph A. (2008). A Guide to the Dead Sea Scrolls and Related Literature. Grand Rapids, MI: William B. Eerdmans Publishing Company. ISBN 9780802862419.
- Halley, Henry H. (1965). Halley's Bible Handbook: an abbreviated Bible commentary (24th (revised) ed.). Zondervan Publishing House. ISBN 0-310-25720-4.
- Hayes, Christine (2015). Introduction to the Bible. Yale University Press. ISBN 978-0300188271.
- Jones, Gwilym H. (2007). "12. 1 and 2 Samuel". In Barton, John; Muddiman, John (eds.). The Oxford Bible Commentary (first (paperback) ed.). Oxford University Press. pp. 196–232. ISBN 978-0199277186.
- Klein, R.W. (2003). "Samuel, books of". In Bromiley, Geoffrey W (ed.). The International Standard Bible Encyclopedia. Eerdmans. ISBN 9780802837844.
- Knight, Douglas A (1995). "Chapter 4 Deuteronomy and the Deuteronomists". In James Luther Mays, David L. Petersen and Kent Harold Richards (ed.). Old Testament Interpretation. T&T Clark. ISBN 9780567292896.
- McKane, William (1993). "Samuel, Book of". In Metzger, Bruce M; Coogan, Michael D (eds.). The Oxford Companion to the Bible. Oxford University Press. pp. 409–413. ISBN 978-0195046458.
- Ulrich, Eugene, ed. (2010). The Biblical Qumran Scrolls: Transcriptions and Textual Variants. Brill.
- Würthwein, Ernst (1995). The Text of the Old Testament. Translated by Rhodes, Erroll F. Grand Rapids, MI: Wm. B. Eerdmans. ISBN 0-8028-0788-7.
