= Court recorder =

Court Recorder may refer to

- Court reporter, someone who captures live testimony in court for the record
- Recorder (Bible), a functionary at the Court of King David in the Hebrew Bible
- Recorder (judge), a type of judge in some legal systems
