= Asaph (biblical figure) =

Multiple men from the Hebrew Bible

Asaph (English: /ˈeɪ.sæf/ Ay-saf; Hebrew: אָסָף ’Āsāp̄, "Gather") is the name of three men from the Hebrew Bible.

- Asaph, the father of Joah (2 Kings 18:18–37)
- The articles related to the son of Berachiah and descendant of Kohath refer to the same person:
  - Asaph, son of Berachiah the Gershonite (2 Chronicles 20:14). Together with Heman, the grandson of the Israelite prophet Samuel (1 Chronicles 6:24, or 1 Chronicles 6:39 in non-Hebrew translations), he and his male descendants were set aside by King David to worship God in song and music (1 Chronicles 15:16–17). He authored Psalm 50, and Psalms 73 to 83.
  - Asaph, a Levite descendant of Kohath (1 Chronicles 26:1)
- Asaph, the keeper of the king's forest under the Persian king Artaxerxes I Longimanus (Nehemiah 2:8)

== See also ==
- Psalms of Asaph
- Psalms
- Asif ibn Barkhiya
