= Joah =

- Gender: Male

Origin
- Origin: Hebrew

Joah (Hebrew: יוֹאָח) is a Hebrew masculine given name, which means "Yahu is his brother" or "God is his brother." It is derived from the two words "Yahu" (the short form of YHWH) and "ach" (a Hebrew word broadly meaning "brother"). Joah may refer to:

== Bible ==
One of four men in the Bible:

- Joahe, son of Asaph and recorder under King Hezekiah (2 Kings 18:18, 2 Kings 18:26; Isaiah 36:3, Isaiah 36:11, Isaiah 36:22)
- Joah, a Levite son of Zimmah (1 Chronicles 6:21 (Hebrew 6); 2 Chronicles 29:12)
- Joaha, a son of Obed-edom (1 Chronicles 26:4)
- Joha, a son of Joahaz and recorder under King Josiah (2 Chronicles 34:8)

== People ==
- Joah Bates (1741–1799), British musician
- Joah Tucker (born 1983), American basketball player

== See also ==
- João
- List of Biblical names
