= Hadadezer ben Rehob =

King of Zobah

Hadadezer bar Rehob

King of Aram Zobah
- Reign: c. late 11th century BCE
- Successor: Rezon (Aram-Damascus)
- Father: Rehob

Hadadezer (Biblical Hebrew: הדדעזר, romanized: Ḥăḏaḏʿezer, lit. 'Hadad helps';), son of Rehob, was king of Zobah or Aram-Zobah (Imperial Aramaic Ṣoḇā), a Syrian kingdom that may have been in the Beqaa Valley (now in Lebanon), extended along the eastern side of the Anti-Lebanon Mountains, reaching Hama to the north. Zobah exercised power throughout southern Syria and inevitably clashed with the expanding empire of Israel.

== Biography ==
Hanun, king of Ammon (now Jordan), hired Hadadezer in his war against David. Joab found them in a double-battle array, with the Ammonites toward the capital of Rabbah (now Amman) and the Syrian mercenaries near Medeba. Joab battled the Syrians, which caused them to scatter. This alarmed the Ammonites, who fled back to their capital.

After the Syrians were defeated, Hadadezer traveled north to "recover his border" (2 Samuel 8:3). The power of the Ammonites and the Syrians were finally broken, and David's empire expanded to the Euphrates according to 2 Samuel 10:15–19 and 1 Chronicles 19:15–19.

== See also ==
- List of Syrian monarchs
- Timeline of Syrian history
- list of Aramean kings
- Battle at Helam
