= Metheg-ammah =

Word or phrase used just once in the Bible

Metheg-ammah (Hebrew: מֶ֥תֶג הָאַמָּ֖ה Meṯeḡ hā’Ammāh) is a biblical word or phrase that has caused some difficulty for biblical scholars and translators. The phrase is used once only, at 2 Samuel 8:1.

The whole of 2 Samuel 8:1–13 lists David's conquests after he became king of the United Monarchy and therefore in some translations of the Bible it is treated as a location which he is said to have captured from the Philistines.

An alternate understanding is that this is not a proper name but a Hebrew phrase meaning "bridge of the mother-city" (e.g. Revised Version), which would refer to the Philistine capital at Gath. The parallel text at 1 Chronicles 18:1 refers to Gath and this interpretation is followed also by the NLT, ASV, and NASB. The Pulpit Commentary argues that "Metheg-ammah" means "the bridle of the mother city". We learn from the parallel place (1 Chronicles 18:1) that the city of Gath is meant by this phrase. Gath was at this time the metropolis of Philistia, and had reduced the other four chief towns to a state of vassalage. Thus by taking Gath, his old city of refuge (1 Samuel 27:2), David acquired also the supremacy which he had previously exercised over the whole country".

Some other translations (e.g. Jerusalem Bible, NABRE) leave the word untranslated; for example, the NABRE version has the text as:

After this, David defeated the Philistines and subdued them; and David took … from the Philistines.

and states that "the original Hebrew seems irretrievable".
