= Helam =

Helam: חֵילָם (Hebrew)
- Location within Northeast Israel
- Coordinates: 33°3′4.32″N 35°29′59.63″E
- Country: Israel
- Region: poss. located ≈ 55 km (34 mi)
- Affiliation: present-day Alma, Israel

Helam (Hebrew: חֵילָם / חֵלָאם, ḥêlām; meaning "stronghold", or "place of abundance") is a Hebrew Bible place name. According to 2 Samuel 10:15-18, Helam was the site of King David's victory over the Syrians under Hadadezer. It may be associated with modern Alma, Israel, about 55 km (34 mi) east of the Sea of Galilee.

For Helam/Alema, a place mentioned in 1 Maccabees, see Alma, Syria.

== See also ==
- Alma, Israel
- Hadadezer bar Rehob
- List of biblical places starting with H
