= Court History of David =

Hypothetical biblical source text

The Court History of David (frequently called simply the Court History, and also known as the Succession Narrative) is one of the two hypothetical main source documents of the Books of Samuel, the other being the Accession History. It is viewed as a continuous and self-contained document that covers 2 Samuel 9 – 20 and 1 Kings 1 – 2. The Court History includes several stories with a distinctly negative attitude towards King David (e.g., the story of his adultery with Bathsheba).

German theologian Leonhard Rost described the history of David's family in 2 Samuel 9–20 and 1 Kings 1–2 as a Succession Document aiming to justify Solomon's succession to the throne of the United Monarchy after the death of David. American theologian James Flanagan later argued that behind this Succession Document lay an earlier work, a Court History, which sought to legitimate David's rule over the kingdoms of Judah and Israel. Tremper Longman and Raymond Dillard suggest it is "rare to find as much unanimity among critical scholars as has attended the isolation and identification of the so-called Court History of Succession Narrative."

Richard Elliott Friedman suggested in his book The Hidden Book in the Bible (1999) that the Court History and the Accession History were originally part of a single historical epic written by the Yahwist author covering the history of the Israelite world until the time of David and Solomon. Friedman's thesis in The Hidden Book in the Bible is that the Yahwist author wrote many of the most familiar stories in the Hebrew Bible, including the stories of Adam and Eve, Abraham, Moses, and David, as one unified text.

Adrien Bledstein argues that Tamar wrote part of the Succession Narrative, finding solace by writing the life of her father David.
