= Ziba (biblical figure) =

Man in 2 Samuel in the Hebrew Bible

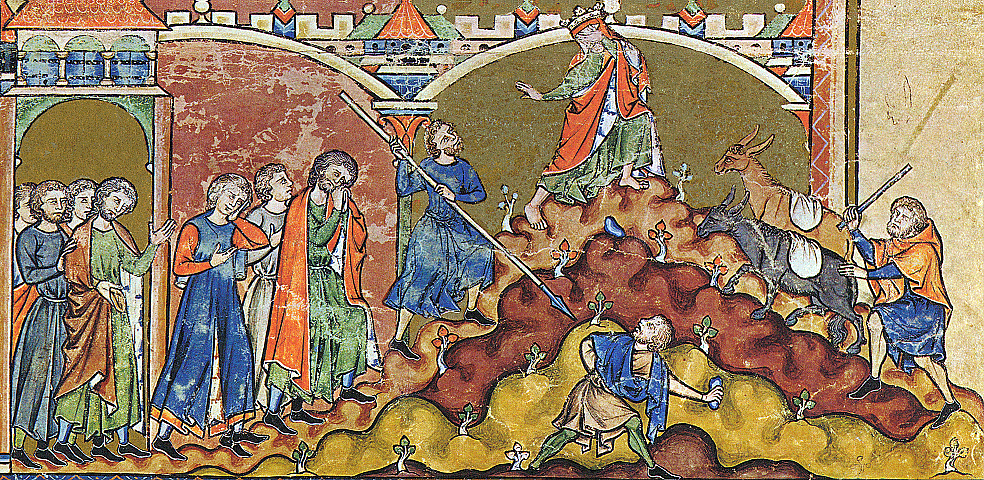
Illustration from the Morgan Bible of David fleeing Jerusalem. Ziba is on the right, bringing David provisions.

Ziba (ציבא) is a man in 2 Samuel in the Hebrew Bible. He was a servant of Saul, and then later of Saul's grandson, Mephibosheth.

Ziba is mentioned in three places. In 2 Samuel 9, David speaks to him and tells him how Mephibosheth will be his master. In 2 Samuel 16, when David flees Jerusalem after Absalom's conspiracy, Ziba comes to David with provisions, and claims that Mephibosheth has broken faith with David. David responds by giving all that belonged to Mephibosheth to Ziba instead. Finally, in 2 Samuel 19, when David returns to Jerusalem, Mephibosheth tells David that Ziba had been lying, David responds by saying "You and Ziba shall divide the land."

David seems not to know whom to believe, but most commentators have concluded that Ziba was lying in order to "make himself appear to be the only loyal subject worthy of David's benefactions, and of title to Saul's property".

Ziba had fifteen sons, and although he was a servant of the house of Saul, he had twenty servants of his own (2 Samuel 9:10).

Ziba is mentioned in Daniel Defoe's 1701 satirical poem, "The True-Born Englishman":

My Cousin, Ziba, of Immortal Fame,
(Ziba and I shall never want a Name),
First-born of Treason, nobly did advance
His Master's Fall for his Inheritance,
By whose keen Arts old David first began
To break his Sacred Oath to Jonathan:
The Good Old King, 'tis thought, was very loth
To break his Word, and therefore broke his Oath.
Ziba's a Traytor of some Quality,
Yet Ziba might have been informed by me:
Had I been there, he ne'er had been content
With half the Estate, nor half the Government.
