= Recorder (Bible) =

Royal court role in Kingdoms of Judah and Israel

A recorder (Hebrew: מזכיר mazkir), as mentioned in the Hebrew Bible, was a high-ranking officer in the Jewish state, who would have worked very closely with the Jewish king; the literal meaning of the term is ‘remembrancer’.

The office was first held by Jehoshaphat in the court of David (2 Samuel 8:16), also in the court of Solomon (1 Kings 4:3). The next recorder mentioned was Joah (son of Asaph), in the reign of Hezekiah (2 Kings 18:18,37; Isaiah 36:3,22); during the reign of Josiah another Joah (son of Joahaz) filled this office (2 Chronicles 34:8).

The "recorder" was the chancellor or vizier of the kingdom. He brought all weighty matters under the notice of the king, "such as complaints, petitions, and wishes of subjects or foreigners. He also drew up papers for the king's guidance, and prepared drafts of the royal will for the scribes. All treaties came under his oversight; and he had the care of the national archives or records, to which, as royal historiographer, like the same state officer in Assyria and Egypt, he added the current annals of the kingdom."
