= Mephibosheth =

Biblical character

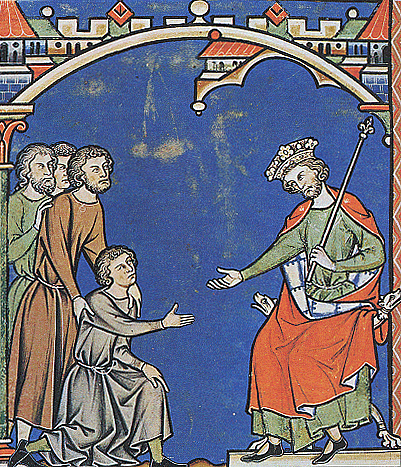
Illustration from the Morgan Bible of Mephibosheth kneeling before David.

Mephibosheth (Biblical Hebrew: מְפִיבֹשֶׁת, romanized: Məp̄īḇošeṯ, lit. 'exterminating [the] idol'), also known as Meribaal (מְרִיב־בַּעַל, Mərīḇ-Baʻal) or Miphibosheth, was the son of Jonathan and thus a grandson of Saul, the first king of the United Monarchy of ancient Israel and Judah. He is mentioned in the biblical Books of Samuel.

== Life ==
Mephibosheth was five years old when both his father and grandfather died at the Battle of Mount Gilboa. After the deaths of Saul and Jonathan, Mephibosheth's nurse took him and fled in panic. (2 Samuel 4:4) In her haste, the child fell, or was dropped while fleeing. After that, he was unable to walk.

After the accident, Mephibosheth was carried with the rest of his family beyond the Jordan to the mountains of Gilead, where he found refuge in the house of Makhir ben Ammiel, a powerful Gadite or Manassite headman at Lo-debar, not far from Mahanaim, which during the reign of his uncle Ishbosheth was the headquarters of his family.

Some years later, after his accession to the kingship of the United Monarchy, King David sought "someone of the house of Saul, to whom I may show the kindness of God" and Mephibosheth was brought to him by Ziba, Saul's servant. Old Testament scholar Walter Brueggemann says the mention of Mephibosheth's disability may have been added to show that he was not a military or political threat to David.

David restored Saul's inheritance to Mephibosheth and permitted him to live within his palace in Jerusalem.

According to 2 Samuel 9:12, 1 Chron 8:34 and 1 Chron 9:40 he had a son called Micah.

== Name ==
He is called Mephibosheth, meaning "from the mouth of shame", in the Books of Samuel while the Books of Chronicles (8:34 and 9:40) call him Meribbaal. Arnold Gottfried Betz and David Noel Freedman argue that Memphibaal, a name preserved in the Lucianic recension may actually be the original name of Jonathan's son, while Meribbaal may originally refer to one of Saul's sons.

There is some scholarly agreement that Mephibosheth replaced Meribbaal (or Memphibaal) in order to conceal the theophoric name "baal", a reference to a Canaanite deity, which had become taboo.
