= 1 Kings 1 =

1 Kings, chapter 1

- ← 2 Samuel 24 chapter 2 →
- The pages containing the Books of Kings (1 & 2 Kings) Leningrad Codex (1008 CE).
- Book: First book of Kings
- Hebrew Bible part: Nevi'im
- Order in the Hebrew part: 4
- Category: Former Prophets
- Christian Bible part: Old Testament
- Order in the Christian part: 11

1 Kings 1 is the first chapter of the Books of Kings in the Hebrew Bible or the First Book of Kings in the Old Testament of the Christian Bible. The book is a compilation of various annals recording the acts of the kings of Israel and Judah by a Deuteronomic compiler in the seventh century BCE, with a supplement added in the sixth century BCE. This chapter belongs to the section focusing on the reign of Solomon over the unified kingdom of Judah and Israel (1 Kings 1 to 11). The focus of this chapter is the reign of David and Solomon, the kings of Israel.

== Text ==
This chapter was originally written in the Hebrew language and since the 16th century is divided into 53 verses.

=== Textual witnesses ===
Some early manuscripts containing the text of this chapter in Hebrew are of the Masoretic Text tradition, which includes the Codex Cairensis (895), Aleppo Codex (10th century), and Codex Leningradensis (1008). Fragments containing parts of this chapter in Hebrew were found among the Dead Sea Scrolls, that is, 5Q2 (5QKings; 150–50 BCE) with extant verses 1, 16–17, 27–37.

There is also a translation into Koine Greek known as the Septuagint, made in the last few centuries BCE. Extant ancient manuscripts of the Septuagint version include Codex Vaticanus (B; $\mathfrak{G}$^{B}; 4th century) and Codex Alexandrinus (A; $\mathfrak{G}$^{A}; 5th century). (Note: The whole book of 1 Kings is missing from the extant Codex Sinaiticus.)

=== Old Testament references ===
- 1 Kings 1:32–40: 1 Chronicles 29:21–25

== Analysis ==
The first two chapters of the Books of Kings describe the final phase of David's story and the beginning of Solomon's. However, 1 Kings 1 is a new narrative, not a continuation of 1–2 Samuel, as 1–2 Kings also markedly differ from other biblical and extrabiblical ancient literature. This chapter in particular is strongly related to 2 Samuel 11–12, because only in these chapters (and not in between them) Bathsheba, Nathan the prophet, and Solomon are mentioned. The narrative clarifies how God fulfills His promise to establish David's kingdom forever through his son (2 Samuel 7:12–13).

== David's weakness and old age (verses 1–4) ==
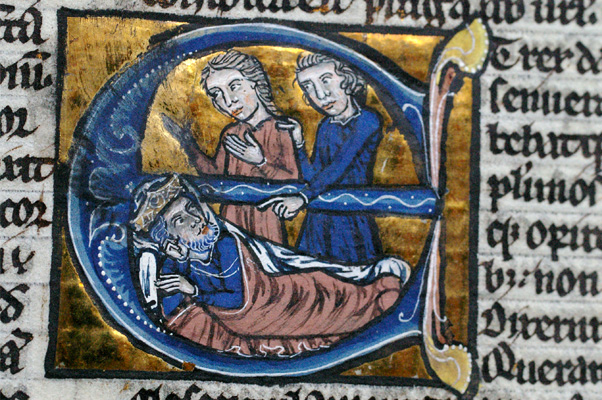
"King David, Abishag, and a serf", miniature from the Bible of the Monastery of Santa Maria de Alcobaça, c. 1220s (National Library of Portugal)

The opening scene of the Books of Kings describes King David as an "old and impotent man, shivering with cold", a unique depiction of a highly respected king in ancient historiography. The beautiful young Abishag was to accompany him and later played a role without even saying one word (1 Kings 2:17, 22). The loss of David's virility (implied in verse 4) suggested to the palace officers that the aging David might have lost his ability to govern as well.

=== Verse 2 ===
Therefore, his servants said to him, "Let a young woman, a virgin, be sought for our lord the king, and let her stand before the king, and let her care for him; and let her lie in your bosom, that our lord the king may be warm."

"A young woman, a virgin", from Hebrew: נערה בתולה na-‘ă-rāh ḇə-ṯū-lāh, is an appositional expression that is idiomatic: 'the second term specifically defines the more general first term'.

== The struggle for succession to David's throne (verses 5–10) ==
Feeling that the time for David's succession had arrived. Adonijah, who was David's fourth son but at that time was apparently the oldest surviving son after the death of his brothers Amnon and Absalom (2 Samuel 14; 18; cf. 2 Samuel 3:2–5). He seized the opportunity to announce his ambitions to be king, but he followed the same path as Absalom's and similarly failed (cf. 2 Samuel 14:25–26; 15:1). Adonijah seemed to take David's paternal silence as 'implied approval' and he gathered support from the leading personalities and classes in the land of Judah, notably Joab, the commander of the army (cf. 2 Samuel 20:23; 24:1–9 and Abiathar, one of the chief priests and an old companion of David (cf. 1 Samuel 22:20–23; 2 Samuel 15:24–29), along with Judean court civil servants and other members of the royal family. On the other hand, Solomon was the tenth in the line of David's sons (cf. 2 Samuel 3:2–5; 5:14–16), but with David's explicit approval, he received the support of 'political and military heavyweights of the city of Jerusalem', notably: 'the mercenary general' Benaiah, with his elite troops (2 Samuel 20:23; 23:8–39), the other high priest, Zadok (2 Samuel 15:24–29) and the prophet Nathan (2 Samuel 7; 12). The situation was as tense as during Absalom's effort (2 Samuel 13:23–29; 15:7–12), because Adonijah invited members of his supporters to a great feast at "a well", probably in the valley of Kidron.

== David's decision in favor of Solomon (verses 11–37) ==
The narrator reports what had unfolded 'within the confines of the palace walls': Nathan talked to Bathsheba (Solomon's mother, cf. 2 Samuel 11–12), Bathsheba talked to David, David to Nathan, David to Bathsheba, then finally David gave a firm order to Zadok, Nathan, and Benaiah, that 'Solomon should be anointed king'. David decided to abdicate to make way for Solomon.

== Solomon's accession to power (verses 38–53) ==
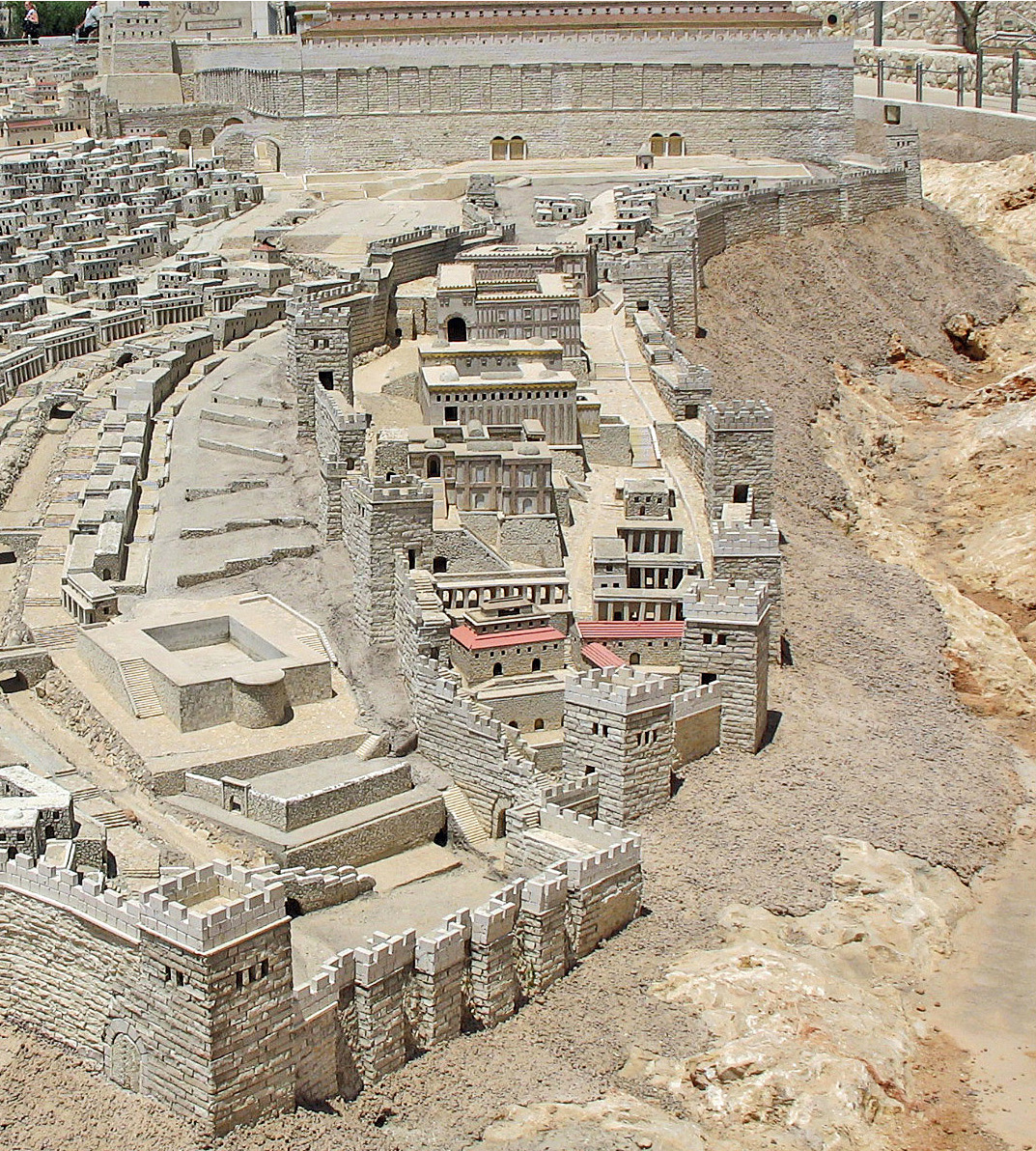
Model of the City of David in the Israel Museum

The anointing of Solomon takes place at the Gihon Spring, just on the east side and below the palace grounds (in the City of David), guarded by David's 'powerful and readily available mercenary troop', the "Cherethites and Pelethites" (cf. 2 Samuel 15:18). Solomon is brought on David's mule: Christian interpretation sees his arrival reflected in Jesus' entry to Jerusalem on a donkey. The holy oil is brought from the tent where the Ark of the Covenant was placed (2 Samuel 6:17), signifying the 'consecration of a king and his authorization to rule'. The witnesses cheered loudly in celebration and the noise stroke fear into the participants of Adonijah's party. Jonathan ben Abiathar (cf. 2 Samuel 17:17–21) informed Adonijah the shocking news of Solomon's anointing. Adonijah fled to the altar standing next the tent that hosted the Ark of the Covenant, believing that its holiness would offer him amnesty (cf. Exodus 21:13-14). Solomon seemed to assure Adonijah a pardon, although only on probation.

== See also ==
- David's Mighty Warriors
- Enrogel
- Haggith
- Israel
- Kohen
- Prophet
- Shimei
- Shofar
- Shunammite
- Tabernacle
- Tribe of Judah
- Zadok
- Zeruiah
- Zoheleth
- Related Bible parts: Exodus 21, 2 Samuel 7, 2 Samuel 11, 2 Samuel 12, 2 Samuel 14, 2 Samuel 17, 2 Samuel 18, 1 Chronicles 3, 1 Chronicles 29

== Sources ==
- Collins, John J. (2014). "Chapter 14: 1 Kings 12 – 2 Kings 25". Introduction to the Hebrew Scriptures. Fortress Press. pp. 277–296. ISBN 9781451469233.
- Coogan, Michael David (2007). Coogan, Michael David; Brettler, Marc Zvi; Newsom, Carol Ann; Perkins, Pheme (eds.). The New Oxford Annotated Bible with the Apocryphal/Deuterocanonical Books: New Revised Standard Version, Issue 48 (Augmented 3rd ed.). Oxford University Press. ISBN 9780195288810.
- Dietrich, Walter (2007). "13. 1 and 2 Kings". In Barton, John; Muddiman, John (eds.). The Oxford Bible Commentary (first (paperback) ed.). Oxford University Press. pp. 232–266. ISBN 978-0199277186.
- Fitzmyer, Joseph A. (2008). A Guide to the Dead Sea Scrolls and Related Literature. Grand Rapids, MI: William B. Eerdmans Publishing Company. ISBN 9780802862419.
- Halley, Henry H. (1965). Halley's Bible Handbook: an abbreviated Bible commentary (24th (revised) ed.). Zondervan Publishing House. ISBN 0-310-25720-4.
- Hayes, Christine (2015). Introduction to the Bible. Yale University Press. ISBN 978-0300188271.
- Leithart, Peter J. (2006). 1 & 2 Kings. Brazos Theological Commentary on the Bible. Brazos Press. ISBN 978-1587431258.
- McKane, William (1993). "Kings, Book of". In Metzger, Bruce M; Coogan, Michael D (eds.). The Oxford Companion to the Bible. Oxford University Press. pp. 409–413. ISBN 978-0195046458.
- Metzger, Bruce M; Coogan, Michael D, eds. (1993). The Oxford Companion to the Bible. Oxford University Press. ISBN 978-0195046458.
- Ulrich, Eugene, ed. (2010). The Biblical Qumran Scrolls: Transcriptions and Textual Variants. Brill.
- Würthwein, Ernst (1995). The Text of the Old Testament. Translated by Rhodes, Erroll F. Grand Rapids, MI: Wm. B. Eerdmans. ISBN 0-8028-0788-7.
