= Cherethites and Pelethites =

Foreign soldiers of King David

In the Bible, the Cherethites (Hebrew: כְּרֵתִי Kərēṯī) and Pelethites (Hebrew: פְּלֵתִי Pəlēṯī), the former also spelled Kerethites, are two ethnic groups in the Levant. Their identity has not been determined with certainty. The Cherethites are mentioned independently three times, and as the "Cherethites and Pelethites" seven times. They are interpreted to have been a group of elite mercenaries employed by King David, some of whom acted as his bodyguards, and others as part of his army.

== Historical translations ==
In the Masoretic Text version of the Book of Ezekiel, a group referred to as "children of the land league" are stated as being allies of Egypt, but in the Septuagint version of the same passage, the group are described instead as "children of the Cherethites"; scholars believe that this is a reference to an alliance of the Philistines as a whole, rather than a subgroup. The Targum, and Syriac Peshitta, regarding the phrase as an appellative, render it "bowmen and slingers", Origen's Hexapla rendered it "corrupted people", while Gesenius proposed in the 19th century that it should be rendered "executioners and runners". Most modern scholars, however, do not believe the phrase to be appellative.

The Septuagint translates "Cherethite" as "Cretans" where it occurs in the writings of the literary prophets, paralleling an ancient tradition that the origin of the people living in Roman Palestine (which was named after the Philistines) had also come from Crete; the latter tradition is connected to that which concerns whether the Philistines originated from Caphtor, an ambiguous location that most modern scholars believe was probably identical to Crete.

== Interpretation ==
It has been suggested that in some passages Cherethites may be used as a synonym for the Philistines.1 Samuel 30:14 describes the Cherethites as living in the Negev (also called "South") near Ziklag, but the same area is described as the land of the Philistines only two verses later. The Bible also refers to the Cherethites in the frequent phrase Cherethites and Pelethites. The Pelethites (Pelethi in Hebrew) are thought to be identical to the Philistines (Pelishti in Hebrew), the former term being a linguistic corruption of the latter; seemingly this differentiates between the Cherethites and the Philistines. Some scholars have proposed that the Cherethites were a second wave of migrants, the Philistines being the first, and that their initial staging post from which they spread was Ziklag, having taken this over as their capital from the Philistines. Some Sages interpret it as the Breastplate of the High Priest. There is a reasonable possibility that the Carites (mentioned for example at 2 Kings 11:4 and 11:19) were identical to the Cherethites, the former term being a linguistic corruption of the latter. If this is the case, then it would appear that these mercenaries were still used by the Israelites in the time of Athaliah.

In the aggadah, the Cherethites are portrayed as being identical to the Sanhedrin, rather than being non-Israelite mercenaries employed by the Israelites; the aggadah argues that Kereti (Hebrew for Cherethites) should be interpreted as being derived from to cut off, in the sense of to make a decree, and thus a reference to making legal decisions. Pseudo-Jerome argues similarly, stating that the phrase Cherethites and Pelethites refers to the congregation of God.

=== Cherethites independently ===
- 1 Samuel 30:14
- Zephaniah 2:5
- Ezekiel 25:16

=== Cherethites and Pelethites ===
- 2 Samuel 8:18
- 2 Samuel 15:18
- 2 Samuel 20:7
- 2 Samuel 20:23
- 1 Kings 1:38
- 1 Kings 1:44
- 1 Chronicles 18:17

== See also ==
- Proselyte
