= Books of Samuel =

Books of the Hebrew Bible

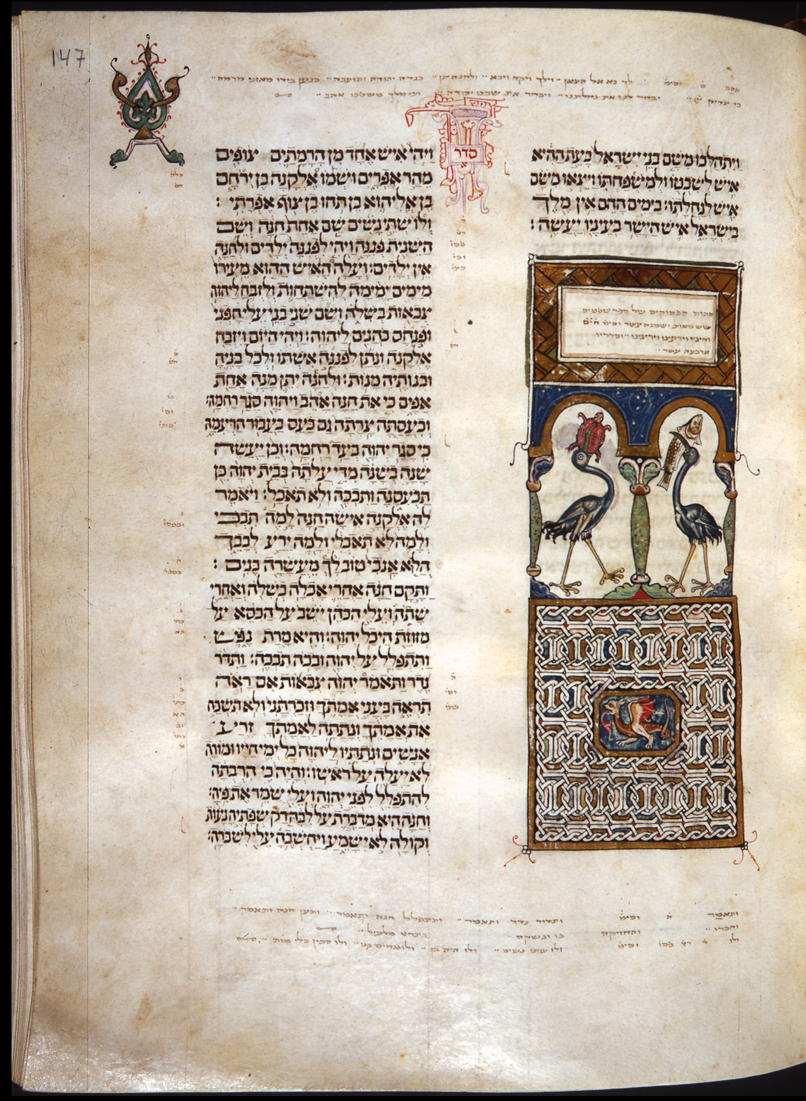
Page from the book of Samuel, in the Biblia de Cervera (1299/1300)

The Book of Samuel (Hebrew: ספר שמואל, romanized: Sefer Shmuel) is a book in the Hebrew Bible, found as two books (1–2 Samuel in most modern translations, 1-2 Kings in the Vulgate) (Note: Within the Vulgate, the books commonly known as 1-2 Kings are then called 3-4 Kings.) in the Old Testament. The book is part of the Deuteronomistic history, a series of books (Joshua, Judges, Samuel, and Kings) that constitute a theological history of the Israelites and that aim to explain God's law for Israel under the guidance of the prophets.

According to Jewish tradition, the book was written by Samuel, with additions by the prophets Gad and Nathan, who together are three prophets who had appeared within 1 Chronicles in its account of David's reign. (Note: They are generally referred to as "Samuel the seer, Nathan the prophet and Gad the seer".) Modern scholarly thinking posits that the entire Deuteronomistic history was composed c. 630–540 BCE by combining a number of independent texts of various ages.

The book begins with Samuel's birth and God's call to him as a boy. The story of the Ark of the Covenant follows. It tells of Israel's oppression by the Philistines, which brought about Samuel's anointing of Saul as Israel's first king. But Saul proved unworthy, and God's choice turned to David, who defeated Israel's enemies, purchased the threshing floor where his son Solomon would build the First Temple, and brought the Ark of the Covenant to Jerusalem. God then promised David and his successors an everlasting dynasty.

In the Septuagint, a basis of the Christian biblical canons, the text is divided into two books, now called the First and Second Book of Samuel.

== Biblical narrative ==
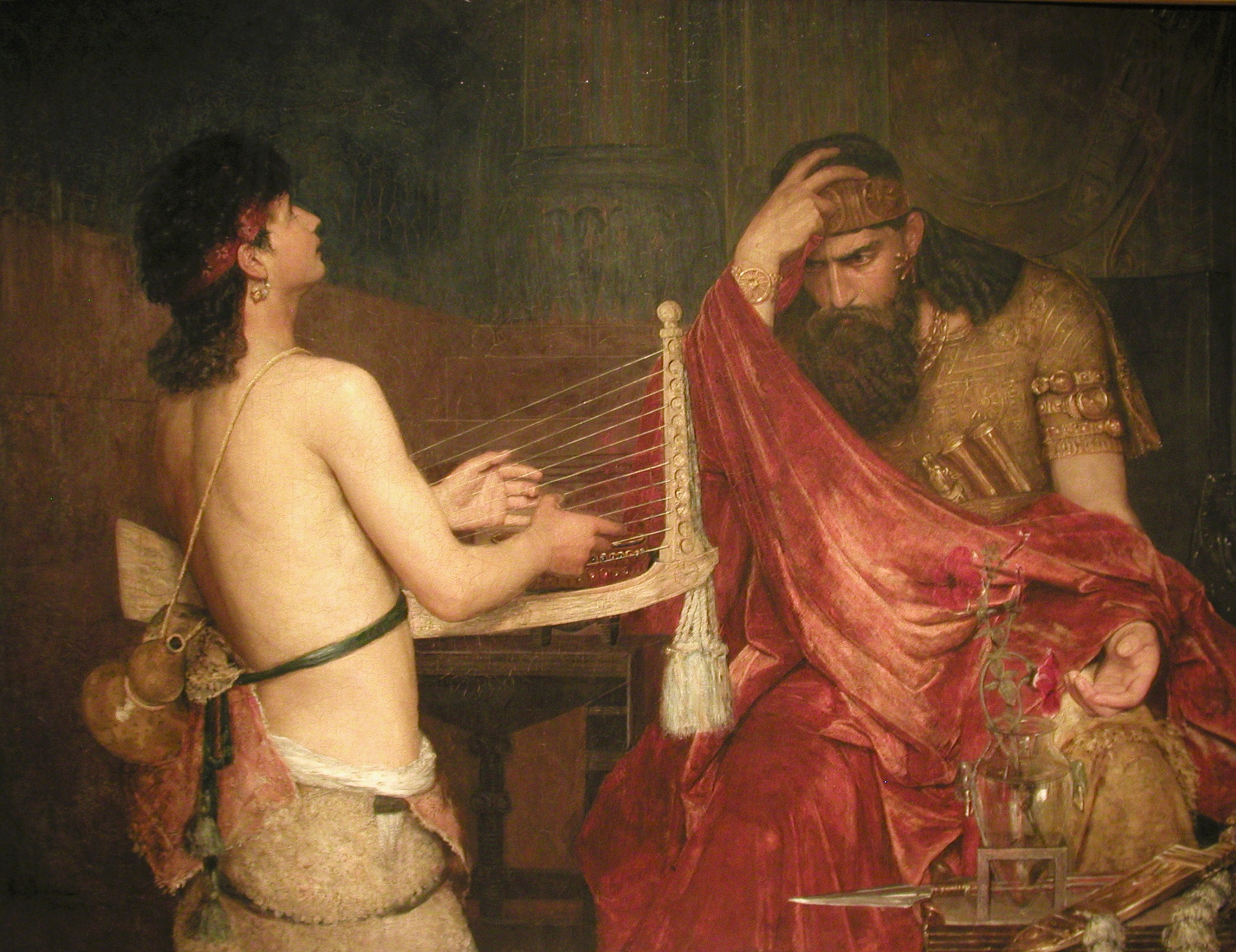
Ernst Josephson, David and Saul, 1878

The Jerusalem Bible divides the two Books of Samuel into five sections. Further subheadings are also based on subdivisions in that version:

1 Samuel 1:1–7:17. Samuel
1 Samuel 8:1–15:35. Samuel and Saul
1 Samuel 16:1–2 Samuel 1:27. Saul and David
2 Samuel 2:1–20:26. David
2 Samuel 21:1–24:25. Supplementary Information

=== 1 Samuel ===
==== Samuel (1:1–7:17) ====
===== The childhood of Samuel (1:1–4:1a) =====
A man named Elkanah, an Ephraimite from the city of Ramathaim-Zophim, has two wives, Peninnah and Hannah, the latter of whom is his favourite wife. A rivalry between the two develops based on the fact that Peninnah has children and Hannah does not. The childless Hannah vows to God, the lord of hosts, that if she has a son, he will be dedicated to God. Eli, the priest of Shiloh, where the Ark of the Covenant is located, thinks she is drunk, but when he realises she is praying, he blesses her. A child named Samuel is born, and Samuel is dedicated to the Lord as a Nazirite – the only one besides Samson to be identified in the Bible. Hannah sings a song of praise upon the fulfilment of her vow.

Eli's sons, Hophni and Phinehas, sin against God's laws and the people, specifically by demanding raw rather than boiled meat for sacrifice and having sexual relations with the Tabernacle's serving women. However, Samuel grows up "in the presence of the Lord": his family visits him each year, bringing him a new coat, and Hannah has five more children. Eli tries to persuade his sons to stop their wickedness but fails. As punishment for this, a holy man arrives, prophesying that Eli's family will be cut off and none of his descendants will see old age.

One night, God calls Samuel, and, thinking Eli is calling him three times, he rushes to Eli. Eli informs him that God wishes to speak to him, and God informs Samuel that the earlier prophecy about Eli's family is correct. Samuel is initially afraid to inform Eli, but Eli tells him not to be, and that God will do what is good in His sight. Over time, Samuel grows up and is recognised as a prophet.

===== The Ark in Philistine hands (4:1b–7:17) =====
The Philistines, despite their initial worries when hearing the Israelite ritual of the entrance of the Ark of the Covenant, defeat the Israelites at the Battle of Aphek, capturing the Ark and killing Hophni and Phinehas, thus fulfilling the earlier prophecy. When Eli hears of these two events, particularly the capture of the Ark, he falls off his chair, breaks his neck, and dies. His daughter-in-law, in turn, goes into labour at this, and names her son Ichabod ('without glory') in commemoration of the capture of the Ark.

Meanwhile, the Philistines take the Ark to the temple of their god Dagon. The next day, they find the idol of Dagon prostrate on the ground before the Ark and then they return the idol to its place. The day after that, they find the idol prostrate again, but with its head and hands cut off. God afflicts the Philistines with hemorrhoids, and they are ultimately unable to take the Ark into any city on account of the fear of the populations of those cities. They return the ark to the Israelites, but to the territory of the tribe of Benjamin, to the city of Beth Shemesh, rather than to Shiloh. It is then passed to the city of Kiriath Jearim, where a new priest, Eleazar, son of Abinadab, is appointed to guard the ark for the twenty years it is there. The Philistines attack the Israelites gathered at Mizpah in Benjamin. Samuel appeals to God, the Philistines are decisively beaten, and the Israelites reclaim their lost territory. Samuel sets up the Eben-Ezer (the stone of help) in remembrance of the battle, and takes his place as judge of Israel.

==== Samuel and Saul (8:1–15:35) ====
===== The institution of the monarchy (8:1–12:25) =====
In Samuel's old age, he appoints his sons Joel and Abijah as judges but, because of their corruption, the people ask for a king to rule over them. God directs Samuel to grant the people their wish despite his concerns: God gives them Saul from the tribe of Benjamin, whom Samuel anoints during an attempt by Saul to locate his father's lost donkeys. He then invites Saul to a feast, where he gives him the best piece of meat, and they talk through the night on the roof of Samuel's house. Samuel tells Saul to return home, telling him the donkeys have been found and his father is now worrying about him, as well as describing a series of signs Saul will see on the way home. Saul begins to prophesy when he meets some prophets, confusing his neighbours. Eventually, Samuel publicly announces Saul as king, although not without controversy.

Shortly after, Nahash of Ammon lays siege to Jabesh Gilead and demands that everyone in the city have their right eye gouged out as part of the peace treaty. The Jabeshites send out messengers, looking for a saviour. When Saul hears of the situation, he gathers a 330,000-strong army and launches a surprise attack at night, leading Israel to victory and saving Jabesh, thus proving those who doubted him wrong. Saul's kingship is renewed.

Samuel is aware he is the final judge and that the age of kings is about to begin, and speaks to the Israelites, demonstrating his innocence and recapping the history of Israel. He calls on the Lord to send thunder and rain, and rebukes the people for their desire for a king. Nonetheless, he tells them that as long as they refrain from idol worship, they will not perish – but if they do, calamity will befall the kingdom.

===== The beginning of Saul's reign (13:1–15:35) =====
Despite his numerous military victories, Saul disobeys God's instructions. After a battle against the Philistines, he does not wait for Samuel to arrive before he offers sacrifices. Meanwhile, it turns out that the Philistines have been killing and capturing blacksmiths in order to ensure the Israelites do not have weapons, and so the Israelites go to war essentially with sharpened farm instruments. Saul's son Jonathan launches a secret attack by climbing a pass into the Philistine camp and kills twenty people in the process. The panic this creates leads to a victory for the Israelites. Jonathan finds some honey and eats it, despite a royal decree not to eat until evening.

Jonathan begins to doubt his father, reasoning an even greater victory could have been achieved if the men had eaten. The royal decree has other unintended knock-on effects, namely that the men start killing and eating animals without draining the blood. To counteract this, Saul sets up an altar so the proper laws can be observed. When a priest suggests asking God before launching another attack, God is silent, leading Saul to set up a pseudo-legal procedure to ascertain whose fault it is that God has abandoned them. The lot falls on Jonathan, but the men refuse to let him be executed since he is the reason for their victory.

Over time, Saul fights the Moabites, the Ammonites, the Edomites, the Zobahites, the Philistines and the Amalekites, winning victory over them all. His kingdom is in a constant state of war, and he constantly recruits new heroes to his army. However, he disobeys God's instruction to destroy Amalek: Saul spares Agag, the Amalekite ruler, and the best portion of the Amalekite flocks to present them as sacrifices. Samuel rebukes Saul and tells him that God has now chosen another man to be king of Israel. Samuel then kills Agag himself.

==== Saul and David (16:1–31:13) ====
===== David at court (16:1–19:7) =====
Samuel travels to Bethlehem to visit a man named Jesse, with God promising Samuel can anoint one of his sons as king. However, while inspecting Jesse's sons, God tells Samuel that none of them are to be king. God tells Samuel to anoint David, the youngest brother, as king. Saul becomes ill and David comes to play the harp to him. Saul takes a liking to David and David enters Saul's court as his armor-bearer and harpist.

A new war against the Philistines begins, and a Philistine champion named Goliath emerges, challenging any Israelite to one-on-one combat, with the loser's people becoming subject to the winner. David goes to take food to his brothers in the Israelite camp, learns of the situation and the reward Saul is willing to give to the person who kills him -- great wealth, his daughter's hand in marriage and exemption from taxes for the killer's family -- and tells Saul he will kill Goliath. Saul wants him to wear his armour, but David finds he cannot because he is not used to it. Seeing David's youth, Goliath begins to curse him. David slings a stone into Goliath's forehead, and Goliath dies. David cuts off Goliath's head with Goliath's sword.

Jonathan befriends David. Saul begins to send David on military missions and quickly promotes him given his successes, but begins to become jealous of David after the Israelites make up a song about how much more successful David is than Saul. One day, Saul decides to kill David with a spear, but David avoids him. Saul realises that God is now with David and no longer with him, making him scared of David. He therefore seeks other ways to pacify David. First, he sends him on military campaigns, but this only makes him more successful.

Next, he tries to marry him off to his daughter Merab, but David refuses, and so Merab is married off to the nobleman Adriel. However, Michal, another of Saul's daughters, is in love with David. Although David is still unsure about becoming son-in-law to the king, Saul requires only 100 Philistine foreskins as a bride price. Although this is a plan to have David captured by the Philistines, David kills 200 Philistines and brings their foreskins back to Saul.

Saul then plots David's death, but Jonathan talks him out of it.

===== The flight of David (19:8–21:16) =====
Once again Saul tries to kill David with his spear, and so David decides to escape, lowered out of a window by Michal, who then takes an idol, covers it in clothes and places goat's hair on its head to cover David's escape. David visits Samuel. When Saul finds this out, he sends men to capture David, but when they see Samuel they begin prophesying, as does Saul when he tries to capture David himself.

David then visits Jonathan, and they argue about whether Saul actually wants to kill David. David proposes a test: he is to dine with the king the following day for the New Moon festival. However, he will hide in a field and Jonathan will tell Saul that David has returned to Bethlehem for a sacrifice. If the king accepts this, he is not trying to kill him, but if he becomes angry, he is. Jonathan devises a code to relay this information to David: he will come to the stone Ezel, shoot three arrows at it and tell a page to find them. If he tells the page the arrows are on his side of the stone, David can come to him, but if he tells them they are beyond the stone, he must run away. When Jonathan puts the plan into action, Saul attempts to kill him with his spear. Jonathan relays this to David using his code and the two weep as they are separated.

David arrives at Nob, where he meets Ahimelech the priest, a great-grandson of Eli. Pretending he is on a mission from the king and is going to meet his men, he asks for supplies. He is given the showbread and Goliath's sword. He then flees to Gath and seeks refuge at the court of King Achish, but feigns insanity since he is afraid of what the Philistines might do to him.

===== David the outlaw (22:1–26:25) =====
David travels to the cave of Adullam near his home, where his family visit him, until he finds refuge for them at the court of the king of Moab in Mizpah.

One of Saul's servants, Doeg the Edomite, saw David at Nob, and informs Saul that he was there. Saul arrives at the town, concludes that the priests are supporting David and has Doeg kill them all. One priest gets away: Abiathar, son of Ahimelech, who goes to join David. David accepts him, since he feels somewhat responsible for the massacre. David liberates the village of Keilah from the Philistines with the help of God and Abiathar. When God tells him that Saul is coming and the citizens of Keilah will hand him over to Saul, David and his men escape to the desert of Ziph, where Jonathan comes and recognises him as the next king. Some Ziphites inform Saul that David is in the desert, but Saul's search is broken off by another Philistine invasion.

After the invasion, Saul learns David is now living in the desert of En Gedi and resumes his search for him. At one point, he enters a cave to relieve himself. David and his men are further back in the cave. They discuss the possibility of killing Saul, but David opts to merely cut a corner off his robe and use this as proof that he does not in fact wish to kill Saul. Saul repents of how he has treated David, recognises him as the next king and makes him promise not to kill off his descendants.

Samuel dies, and, after mourning him, David moves on to the Desert of Paran. Here he meets the shepherds of a Calebite named Nabal, and his men help protect them. At sheep-shearing time, he sends some of his men to ask for food. Nabal refuses, preferring to keep his food for his household. When his wife, Abigail, hears of this, she takes a large amount of supplies to David herself. This turns out to be at exactly the right moment, since David had just threatened to kill everyone in Nabal's home. Abigail begs for mercy, and David agrees, praising her wisdom. That night Nabal has a feast, so Abigail waits until morning to tell him what she has done. He has a heart attack and dies ten days later. David marries Abigail and a woman from Jezreel named Ahinoam, but in the meantime Saul has married David's first wife, Michal, off to a nobleman named Palti, son of Laish.

Saul decides to return to pursuing David, and the Ziphites alert him as to David's whereabouts. Saul returns to the desert of Ziph and sets up camp. One night, David and two companions, Achimelech the Hittite and Abishai son of Zeruiah (his nephew), go to Saul's camp and find him asleep on the ground. Abishai advocates killing him, but David once again resists, content with taking a spear and water jug lying by Saul's head. The next morning, David advises Abner, Saul's captain, to put the soldiers to death for not protecting Saul, citing the absence of the spear and water jug as evidence. Saul interrupts, and once again repents of his hunt. He blesses David, David returns his spear and Saul returns home.

===== David among the Philistines (27:1–31:13) =====
David joins the Philistines out of fear of Saul, taking his wives with him and brutally destroying his enemies, largely the Geshurites, the Girzites and the Amalekites, but makes the Philistines believe he is attacking the Israelites, the Jerahmeelites and the Kenites instead. King Achish is pleased with him, and supposes he will continue to serve him. Eventually, the Philistines go to war with the Israelites, and David goes with them.

Meanwhile, Saul is growing increasingly anxious about the upcoming battle, but cannot get advice from God. He decides to attempt to contact Samuel from beyond the grave. While he has expelled all the witches and spiritists, he learns that one remains at Endor. After Saul assures her she will not be punished, she agrees to summon Samuel. Samuel is not happy to be disturbed, and reveals that the Philistines will win the battle, with Saul and his sons dying in the process. Saul is shocked and, although at first reluctant, eats some food and leaves.

Back in the Philistine camp, several of the rulers are not happy with the idea of fighting alongside David, suspecting he may defect during the battle. Achish therefore reluctantly sends David back instead of bringing him to Jezreel with the Philistine army. When David and his men arrive in Ziklag, they find it sacked by the Amalekites, and David's wives taken captive. After seeking God's advice, David decides to pursue the raiding Amalekites, finding the Egyptian slave of one, abandoned when he became ill, who can show them the band. When they are located and found to be feasting, David fights all day, with only 400 escaping on camels. David recovers everything and returns to the Besor Valley, where 200 men who were too exhausted to come with him have been guarding supplies. David announces all are to share in the treasure, and even sends some to the elders of Judah when he returns to Ziklag.

Meanwhile, the Battle of Mount Gilboa is raging on and, as Samuel said, the Philistines are winning. Saul's three sons have been killed, and he himself has been wounded by arrows. Saul asks his armor-bearer to run his sword through him rather than let him be captured by the Philistines, but does it himself when the armor-bearer refuses. When they see the battle going badly, the Israelites flee their towns, allowing the Philistines to occupy them. The next day, the Philistines find Saul, behead him, and take his armour to the temple of Astarte and his body to Beth Shan. When they hear what has happened, the citizens of Jabesh Gilead take his body and perform funerary rites in their city.

=== 2 Samuel ===
==== Saul and David (continued) (1:1–1:27) ====
===== David among the Philistines (continued) (1:1–1:27) =====
Back in Ziklag, three days after Saul's death, David receives news that Saul and his sons are dead. It transpires that the messenger is an Amalekite who, at Saul's insistence, had killed Saul to speed his death along, and brought his crown to David. David orders his death for having killed God's anointed. At this point, David offers a majestic eulogy, where he praises the bravery and magnificence of both his friend Jonathan and King Saul.

==== David (2:1–20:26) ====
===== David King of Judah (2:1–4:12) =====
David returns to Hebron at God's instruction. The elders of Judah anoint David as king, and as his first act he offers a reward to the people of Jabesh Gilead for performing Saul's funerary rites. Meanwhile, in the north, Saul's son Ish-bosheth, supported by Abner, has taken control of the northern tribes. David and Ish-bosheth's armies meet at the Pool of Gibeon, and Abner and Joab, another son of Zeruiah and David's general, agree to have soldiers fight in one-on-one combat. All this achieves is twelve men on each side killing each other, but a battle follows and David wins. During the Benjaminites' retreat, Joab's brother Asahel chases Abner and Abner kills him, shocking everyone. Joab and Abishai continue Asahel's pursuit. A truce is declared when they reach a hill to avoid further bloodshed, and Abner and his men are able to cross the Jordan.

The war continues as David builds a family. Meanwhile, the House of Saul is getting weaker. When Ish-bosheth accuses Abner of sleeping with Saul's concubine Rizpah, Abner offers to join David, which David accepts as long as he brings Michal with him. At the same time, David sends a petition to Ish-bosheth for the return of Michal, which Ish-bosheth agrees to. Patiel follows her crying until he is told to return home. Following the return of Michal, Abner agrees to get the elders of Israel to agree to make David king. Joab believes Abner was lying in his purpose of coming to David and, after recalling him to Hebron, kills him in revenge for Asahel. David curses Joab's family to always contain a leper, someone disabled or someone hungry. He then holds a funeral for Abner.

By this point, the only other surviving member of Ish-bosheth's family is Mephibosheth, Jonathan's disabled son, who was dropped by his nurse as she attempted to escape the palace after the deaths of Saul and Jonathan. Ish-bosheth is murdered by Rechab and Baanah, two of his captains who hope for a reward from David, who stab him and cut off his head. They bring his head to David, but David has them killed for killing an innocent man. They are hanged by the pool of Hebron and Ish-bosheth's head is buried in Abner's tomb.

===== David King of Judah and of Israel (5:1–8:18) =====
David is anointed king of all Israel.

Against all odds, David captures Jerusalem from the Jebusites. He takes over the fortress of Zion and builds up the area around it. Hiram I, king of Tyre sends craftsmen to build David a palace. Meanwhile, David's family continues to grow. The Philistines decide to attack Israel now that David is king, but God allows David to defeat them in two battles, first in Baal Perizim and next in the Valley of Rephaim.

The Ark is currently still in Baalah (another name for Kiriath Jearim), but David wants to bring it to Jerusalem. He puts it on a cart and employs the priests Uzzah and Ahio, both sons of Abinadab and brothers of Eleazar, to accompany it. A grand procession with musical instruments is organised, but comes to a sudden halt when the oxen stumble, causing Uzzah to touch the Ark and die. David is afraid to take it any further and stores it in the house of a man named Obed-Edom. When, after three months, Obed-Edom and his family have received nothing but blessings, David takes the Ark to Jerusalem. As part of the ceremony bringing the Ark into the city, David dances in front of it wearing nothing but an ephod. Michal sees this and is annoyed, but David says it was for the Lord, and thus it was not undignified. Michal never has any children.

David wishes to build a temple, arguing that he should not be living in a palace while God lives in a tent. Nathan, a prophet, agrees. However, that night Nathan has a dream in which God informs him that David should not build him a temple for three reasons. Firstly, God has not commanded it, and has never complained about living in a tent before. Secondly, God is still working to build David and his house up and establish the Israelites in the Promised Land. Thirdly, God will establish one of David's sons as king. He will build the temple, and his house will never be out of power. When Nathan reports this to David, David prays to God, thanking him for these revelations. David defeats the enemies of Israel, slaughtering Philistines, Moabites, Edomites, Syrians, and Arameans. He then appoints a cabinet.

===== David's family and the intrigues for the succession (9:1–20:26) =====
====== Mephibosheth (9:1–9:13) ======
David asks if anyone from the House of Saul is still alive so that he can show kindness to them in memory of Jonathan. Ziba, one of Saul's servants, tells him about Mephibosheth. David informs Mephibosheth that he will live in his household and eat at his table, and Mephibosheth moves to Jerusalem.

====== The Ammonite war and birth of Solomon (10:1–12:31) ======
Nahash, king of Ammon dies and his son Hanun succeeds him. David sends condolences, but the Ammonites suspect his ambassadors are spies and humiliate them before sending them back to David. When they realise their mistake, they fear retaliation from David and amass an army from the surrounding tribes. When David hears that they are doing this, he sends Joab to lead his own army to their city gates, where the Ammonites are in battle formation. Joab decides to split the army in two: he will lead an elite force to attack the Aramean faction, while the rest of the army, led by Abisai, will focus on the Ammonites.

If either enemy force turns out to be too strong, the other Israelite force will come to help their comrades. The Arameans flee from Joab, causing the Ammonites to also flee from Abishai. The Israelite army returns to Jerusalem. The Arameans regroup and cross the Euphrates, and this time David himself wins a decisive victory at Helam. The Arameans realise they cannot win, make peace with Israel and refuse to help the Ammonites again. The following spring, Joab destroys the Ammonites.

While Joab is off at war, David remains in Jerusalem. One morning, he is standing on the roof of his palace when he sees a naked woman performing ablutions after her period. David learns her name is Bathsheba, and they have sex. She becomes pregnant. Seeking to hide his sin, David recalls her husband, Uriah the Hittite, from battle, David encourages him to go home and see his wife, but Uriah declines in case David might need him, and sleeps in the doorway to the palace that night. David, in spite of inviting Uriah to feasts, continues to be unable to persuade him to go home.

David then deliberately sends Uriah on a suicide mission. David loses some of his best warriors in this mission, so Joab tells the messenger reporting back to tell David that Uriah is dead. David instructs Joab to continue the attack of the city. After Bathsheba has finished mourning Uriah, David marries her and she gives birth.

Nathan comes to David and tells him a parable. In a town, there are a rich man and a poor man. The rich man has much livestock, but the poor man has only one lamb whom he loves like a child. One day, the rich man has a guest for dinner, and instead of slaughtering one of his own livestock, took the poor man's lamb and cooked it. David angrily insists the rich man be put to death, but Nathan tells him he is the man, saying he has committed a sin to get something he already had plenty of (wives), and prophesies that his family will be gripped by violence, and someone will have affairs with his wives publicly.

David repents, and Nathan tells him that while he is forgiven and will not die, his son with Bathsheba will. The child becomes ill, and David spends his time fasting and praying, but to no avail, because the child dies. David's attendants are scared to tell him the news, worried about what he may do. He surprises everyone by ending his fasting, saying that he was fasting and praying was an attempt to persuade God to save his child, whereas fasting now isn't going to bring the child back. After they have mourned, David and Bathsheba have another child, who they name Solomon (also called Jedediah).

Back on the front line, in the city of Rabbah, Joab has gained control of the water supply. Joab invites David to finish capturing the city so that it may be named after himself. David gathers an army and travels up himself. He wins a victory, crowns himself king of the Ammonites, takes a large amount of plunder and puts the Ammonites into forced labour before returning to Jerusalem.

====== Absalom (13:1–20:26) ======
A complicated controversy begins to develop within the palace. Amnon, David's son by Ahinoam, becomes lovesick for Tamar, David's daughter by Maacah, daughter of Talmai, king of Geshur. Amnon's advisor and cousin Jonadab suggests he pretend to be ill and ask Tamar to come and prepare bread for him so he can eat out of her hand. When she comes to his house, Amnon tells her to come to his bedroom. Here, after she refuses to have sex with him, Amnon rapes her. He then forces her to leave the house. She rips the gown which symbolises she is a virgin, puts ashes on her hand and walks around wailing. Tamar's brother, Absalom, and David learn about this and become angry.

Two years later, Absalom is shearing sheep at Baal Hazor and invites David and all his sons to come. David refuses, but blesses him and sends Amnon and the rest of his sons to him. Absalom holds a feast and gets Amnon drunk. He then instructs his servants to kill Amnon in revenge for his rape of Tamar. David's other sons are disgusted and return to Jerusalem. David hears a rumour that Absalom has killed all of David's sons, but Jonadab assures him that only Amnon is dead. Meanwhile, Absalom goes to live with his grandfather in Geshur for three years. After David has finished mourning Amnon, he considers visiting Absalom.

Joab wants to help David, so he tells a wise woman from Tekoa to travel to Jerusalem pretending to be in mourning and speak to the king. The woman tells a story about her two sons, one of whom killed the other and whose death is now being called for. After some cajoling, David agrees to issue a decree ensuring that her son is not killed. The woman turns this back on David, and asks, then, why he has not forgiven his own son.

After the woman admits that Joab put her up to this, David agrees to allow Absalom back to Jerusalem, but insists he does not come to the palace. Absalom becomes popular in Jerusalem due to his good looks. His family also grows during this time. Two years pass without Absalom being recalled to court. When Joab refuses to help him, Absalom sets his field on fire. This gets Joab's attention, and finally Absalom manages to convince him to persuade David to allow him back to court.

Absalom purchases a magnificent chariot, and begins campaigning to become a judge, principally by waiting outside the city gate, listening to the concerns of people coming to the king and pretending there is no-one to hear them, as well as embracing anyone who bows to him. Four years pass, and Absalom travels to Hebron, claiming to be fulfilling a vow, but in fact he hatches a plan to get the tribes of Israel to proclaim him king. The 200 guests who follow him do not know of his plan, and while he is at Hebron Absalom summons Ahitophel, David's counselor.

David is told of the increasing support for Absalom and decides to flee Jerusalem. He takes with him his wives and concubines, with the exception of ten, and a number of Cerethites, Pelethites and Gittites, led by a general named Ittai, who comes with David only after insisting on it. Abiathar and another priest named Zadok, together with a number of Levites who are guarding the Ark, also come, but go back when David tells them to return the Ark to Jerusalem. The procession climbs the Mount of Olives, where he meets his confidant Hushai the Arkite, who he sends back to Jerusalem to act as a spy, seeking to disrupt Ahitophel's plans.

On the other side of the mountain, David meets Ziba, who brings donkeys and fruit as supplies. He claims that Mephibosheth is hoping to be restored to the throne of Saul in the chaos, and David grants Ziba Mephibosheth's estates. As the party approaches Bahurim, a Benjaminite named Shimei begins cursing and stoning David for the bloodshed he caused in the House of Saul. Abishai suggests executing him, but David considers that God has told Shibei to curse him and lets him carry on.

Back in Jerusalem, Ahitophel and Hushai arrive at Absalom's court. Absalom is at first suspicious of Hushai's presence, but ultimately accepts him. Ahitophel suggests Absalom sleeps with David's concubines who he left to take care of the palace in order to entrench the division between David and Absalom, so Absalom pitches a tent on the palace roof and does this in the view of all the Israelites. Ahitophel then suggests launching a sneak attack on David with 12,000 men. Hushai points out that David and his men are fighters, and that they could defeat the men, reducing morale. He suggests Absalom form a much larger army and lead it into battle himself.

God has decided to frustrate Ahitophel's advice so that Absalom can be defeated, so Absalom follows Hushai's advice. Hushai then goes to Zadok and Abiathar and tells them to get word to David to cross the fords. Their sons, Ahimaaz and Jonathan, respectively, are staying at En Rogel, where they receive the message. Unfortunately, one of Absalom's spies sees them so they have to hide in a well in Bahurim. The well's owner's wife hides them and lies to Absalom's men that they have crossed the brook. After Absalom's men are gone, the pair make it to King David and he manages to cross the Jordan in time.

David and Absalom meet at Mahanaim, and David's allies bring his army food, given his army is tired and exhausted after its time in the wilderness. David divides his army into thirds: one led by Joab, one led by Abishai and one led by Ittai. David intends to come out with his men, but his generals veto it. He decides to stay at the city, and instructs his generals to be gentle with Absalom. The battle is fought in the Wood of Ephraim. This proves to be a victory for David, in part because of the treacherous terrain. As Absalom meets David's men, he passes under a tree. His long hair gets caught in the tree and he is hanged. Joab gets word of this, finds him and plunges three javelins into his heart, killing him. Joab declares the battle over and buries Absalom. Absalom's monument is the pillar he built during his lifetime.

Ahimaaz and a Cushite run to tell David the news of his victory and his son's death. Ahimaaz declares the victory, but is not sure yet what the situation with Absalom is. The Cushite bears the same news, but also tells David that Absalom is dead. David begins to mourn, wishing he had died instead of Absalom. This prompts his men to start mourning as well, causing Joab to enter his tent in an attempt to talk sense into him. Joab points out that the battle has saved not only David's life, but the lives of his wives and concubines, and thus it is humiliating for the men to have to mourn for the enemy. David agrees to come out and encourage the men.

Given the sudden change in situation, the elders of Israel begin to argue about what to do next. David convinces the elders of Judah to escort him back to Jerusalem. They are joined by Shimei, who apologises to David. Abishai once again calls for the death penalty, but once again David grants clemency. Mephibosheth also comes to David, and explains the earlier situation: he had wanted to come with David and had told Ziba to saddle his donkeys, but Ziba had betrayed and slandered him. David offers to allow him and Ziba to split the land, but Mephibosheth allows Ziba to take the lot in celebration of David's triumph.

David invites his host in Mahanaim, Barzillai, to return to Jerusalem with him, but Barzillai protests on the basis that he is now eighty years old and thus will gain no enjoyment from coming. He gives David his servant Kimham in his place, and David promises to look after him. A scuffle breaks out between the Judahites and the other Israelites about why they specifically got to escort the king home. Attempting to resolve the issue, a Benjaminite named Sheba son of Bichri launches a rebellion against David, which all the tribes except Judah back.

Back in Jerusalem, David begins to sort out the issues that were caused by his absence. First, he puts the ten concubines who were left behind into a guarded house and gives them pensions but does not sleep with them, allowing them to live the rest of their lives as widows. He then begins to sort out a defence against Sheba. He tells Amasa, the general whom he wishes to replace Joab, to summon the Judahite troops and have them in Jerusalem within three days, something he fails at. David therefore tells Abishai to start pursuing Sheba to effectively put down his rebellion before it has begun.

Amasa meets Abishai and Joab at Gibeon. Amasa goes to meet Joab, but Joab's dagger falls out of his tunic, stabbing Amasa in the stomach, killing him. He is covered with a cloth and placed in a field, and the army continues pursuing Sheba. They meet him at Abel Beth Maakah, a stronghold of Sheba's rebellion, and begin to lay siege to it. A wise woman asks them why they want to destroy the city, and Joab responds they don't want to destroy it, but merely end Sheba's rebellion. The wise woman cuts off Sheba's head and throws it to Joab from the city walls, thus ending the siege.

==== Supplementary information (21:1–24:25) ====
2 Samuel concludes with four chapters, chapters 21 to 24, that lie outside the chronological succession narrative of Saul and David, a narrative that will continue in the Books of Kings. Chapter 21 tells the story of a three-year long famine which takes place at the start of David's reign. God explains this is a punishment for Saul's genocide of the Gibeonites, a people group who are the remnants of the Amorites, whom Israel had promised to spare but Saul has massacred. David calls the Gibeonites and asks what he can do to make amends, hoping this will end the famine.

The Gibeonites ask for seven of Saul's descendants to kill, and David agrees. He spares Mephibosheth, but hands over Rizpah's sons Armoni and Mephibosheth and the five sons of Merab and Adriel. They are killed by the Gibeonites and their bodies are exposed at the start of the barley harvest. Rizpah protects the bodies, and David agrees to take the bones of Saul, Jonathan and those killed by the Gibeonites and bury them in the tomb of Kish in Zelah. This pleases God and the famine ends.

Another war then occurs with the Philistines. In the first battle, Abishai kills Ishbi-benob, a Philistine who had sworn to kill David, which leads to David's army refusing to let him fight alongside them again for his own protection. The second battle takes place at Gob, and this time Sibbekai the Hushathite kills a Philistine named Saph. A third battle also takes place in Gob, where Elhanan, son of Jair kills Goliath. (This contradicts that David killed Goliath. In Chronicles it says that Elhanan killed Goliath's brother, rather than Goliath. This is probably an attempt to fix the contradiction.) In the fourth battle, at Gath, Jonathan, son of Shimeah, kills a huge man with six fingers on each hand and six toes on each foot.

Chapter 22 is similar to Psalm 18, and is a song David sang when he was delivered from Saul.

Chapter 23 begins with David's last words, a subdued speech in which David expresses gladness at the goodness of his house. It then tells stories of a group of men identified as 'David's Mighty Warriors'. Josheb-Basshebeth, Eleazar, son of Dodai and Shammah, son of Agee the Hararite all single-handedly win battles against the Philistines. One day, while David and his men are hiding in the cave of Adullam, David becomes homesick and, hearing the Philistines have taken over Bethlehem, cries out desiring water from Bethlehem's well.

These three men risk their lives to work their way through Philistine lines and bring water from the well back to David. David refuses to drink it and offers it to God because his warriors risked their lives for it. Abishai, we learn, achieved his high position by single-handedly killing three hundred men. Another warrior, Benaniah, son of Jehoiada, kills Moab's two mightiest warriors, a lion, and a huge Egyptian with his own spear. The chapter finishes by listing David's other mighty warriors, known as the Thirty.

Chapter 24 tells the story of more calamities on Israel. God is angry once again at Israel, so he instructs David to take a census. Joab has his reservations, but ultimately relents. When the results come in, David realises what he has done, and begs God for mercy. Gad the prophet offers David three choices of punishment: three years of famine, three months of pursuit by his enemies or three days of plague. David chooses the plague. 70,000 people die.

After three days the angel of death reaches Jerusalem, and is on the threshing floor of a man named Araunah the Jebusite, when God tells him to stop. David is horrified, arguing that it should be him and his family who are punished. Gad tells David to build an altar on the threshing floor of Araunah the Jebusite. Araunah offers to sell the land to David for free but David insists on paying. David pays fifty shekels of silver and builds the altar, stopping the plague.

== Composition ==
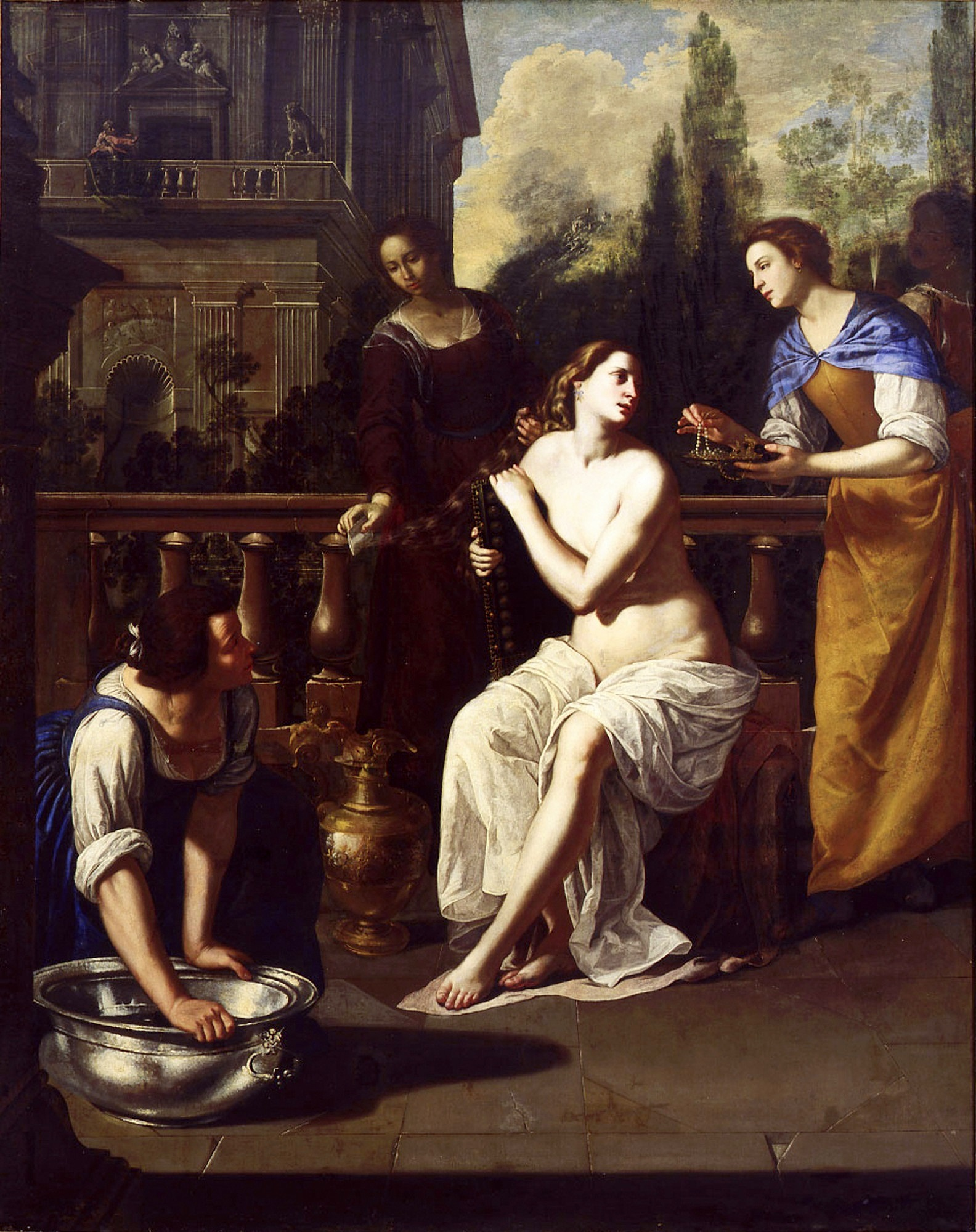
David and Bathsheba, by Artemisia Gentileschi, c. 1636. David is seen in the background, standing on a balcony.

=== Versions ===
1 and 2 Samuel were originally (and, in most Jewish bibles, still are) a single book, but the first Greek translation, called the Septuagint and produced around the 2nd century BCE, divided it into two; this was adopted by the Latin translations used in the early Christian church of the West, and finally introduced into Jewish bibles around the early 16th century.

In imitation of the Septuagint what is now commonly known as 1 Samuel and 2 Samuel, are called by the Vulgate, 1 Kings and 2 Kings respectively. What are now commonly known as 1 Kings and 2 Kings would be 3 Kings and 4 Kings in Bibles dating from before 1516. It was in 1517 that use of the division we know today, used by Protestant Bibles and adopted by Catholics, began. Traditional Catholic and Orthodox Bibles still preserve the Septuagint name; for example, the Douay–Rheims Bible.

The Hebrew text that is used by Jews today, called the Masoretic Text, differs considerably from the Hebrew text that was the basis of the first Greek translation, and scholars are still working at finding the best solutions to the many problems this presents.

=== Historical accuracy ===
The Books of Samuel are considered to be based on both historical and legendary sources, primarily serving to fill the gap in Israelite history after the events described in Deuteronomy. According to Donald Redford, the Books of Samuel exhibit too many anachronisms to have been compiled in the 11th century BCE.

=== Authorship and date of composition ===
According to passages 14b and 15a of the Bava Basra tractate of the Talmud, the book was written by Samuel up until 1 Samuel 25, which notes the death of Samuel, and the remainder by the prophets Gad and Nathan. Critical scholars from the 19th century onward have rejected this idea. However, even prior to this, the medieval Jewish commentator Isaac Abarbanel noted that the presence of anachronistic expressions (such as "to this day" and "in the past") indicated that there must have been a later editor such as Jeremiah or Ezra. Martin Noth in 1943 theorized that Samuel was composed by a single author as part of a history of Israel: the Deuteronomistic history (made up of Deuteronomy, Joshua, Judges, Samuel and Kings). Although Noth's belief that the entire history was composed by a single individual has been largely abandoned, his theory in its broad outline has been adopted by most scholars.

The Deuteronomistic view is that an early version of the history was composed in the time of king Hezekiah (8th century BCE); the bulk of the first edition dates from his grandson Josiah at the end of the 7th century BCE, with further sections added during the Babylonian exile (6th century BCE) and the work was substantially complete c. 550 BCE. Further editing was apparently done even after then. For example, A. Graeme Auld, Professor of Hebrew Bible at the University of Edinburgh, contends that the silver quarter-shekel which Saul's servant offers to Samuel in 1 Samuel 9 "almost certainly fixes the date of this story in the Persian or Hellenistic period".

The 6th-century BCE authors and editors responsible for the bulk of the history drew on many earlier sources, including (but not limited to) an "ark narrative" (1 Samuel 4:1–7:1 and perhaps part of 2 Samuel 6), a "Saul cycle" (parts of 1 Samuel 9–11 and 13–14), the "history of David's rise" (1 Samuel 16:14–2 Samuel 5:10), and the "succession narrative" (2 Samuel 9–20 and 1 Kings 1–2). The oldest of these, the "ark narrative," may even predate the Davidic era.

This view of late compilation for Samuel has faced serious scholarly opposition on the basis that evidence for the Deuteronimistic history is scant, and that Deuteronimistic advocates are not in consensus as to the origin and extent of the History. Secondly, the basic theological concerns identified with the Deuteronimistic school are tenets central to Hebrew theology in texts that are widely regarded as predating Josiah. Thirdly, there are notable differences in style and thematic emphasis between Deuteronomy and Samuel. Finally, there are widely acknowledged structural parallels between the Hittite suzerain treaty of the 2nd millennium BCE and the Book of Deuteronomy itself, far before the time of Josiah. The alternative view is that it is difficult to determine when the events of Samuel were recorded: "There are no particularly persuasive reasons to date the sources used by the compiler later than the early tenth century events themselves, and good reason to believe that contemporary records were kept (cf. 2 Sam. 20:24–25)."

=== Sources ===
The sources used to construct 1 and 2 Samuel are believed to include the following:

- Call of Samuel or Youth of Samuel (1 Samuel 1–7): From Samuel's birth his career as Judge and prophet over Israel. This source includes the Eli narrative and part of the ark narrative.
- Ark narrative (1 Samuel 4:1b–7:1 and 2 Samuel 6:1–20): the ark's capture by the Philistines in the time of Eli and its transfer to Jerusalem by David – opinion is divided over whether this is actually an independent unit.
- Jerusalem source: a fairly brief source discussing David conquering Jerusalem from the Jebusites.
- Republican source: a source with an anti-monarchial bias. This source first describes Samuel as decisively ridding the people of the Philistines, and begrudgingly appointing an individual chosen by God to be king, namely Saul. David is described as someone renowned for his skill at playing the harp, and consequently summoned to Saul's court to calm his moods. Saul's son Jonathan becomes friends with David, which some commentators view as romantic, and later acts as his protector against Saul's more violent intentions. At a later point, having been deserted by God on the eve of battle, Saul consults a medium at Endor, only to be condemned for doing so by Samuel's ghost, and told he and his sons will be killed. David is heartbroken on discovering the death of Jonathan, tearing his clothes as a gesture of grief.
- Monarchial source: a source with a pro-monarchial bias and covering many of the same details as the republican source. This source begins with the divinely appointed birth of Samuel. It then describes Saul as leading a war against the Ammonites, being chosen by the people to be king, and leading them against the Philistines. David is described as a shepherd boy arriving at the battlefield to aid his brothers, and is overheard by Saul, leading to David challenging Goliath and defeating the Philistines. David's warrior credentials lead to women falling in love with him, including Michal, Saul's daughter, who later acts to protect David against Saul. David eventually gains two new wives as a result of threatening to raid a village, and Michal is redistributed to another husband. At a later point, David finds himself seeking sanctuary amongst the Philistine army and facing the Israelites as an enemy. David is incensed that anyone should have killed Saul, even as an act of mercy, since Saul was anointed by Samuel, and has the individual responsible, an Amalekite, killed.
- Court History of David or Succession narrative (2 Samuel 9–20 and 1 Kings 1–2): a "historical novel", in Alberto Soggin's phrase, telling the story of David's reign from his affair with Bathsheba to his death. The theme is of retribution: David's sin against Uriah the Hittite is punished by God through the destruction of his own family, and its purpose is to serve as an apology for the coronation of Bathsheba's son Solomon instead of his older brother Adonijah. Some textual critics have posited that given the intimacy and precision of certain narrative details, the Court Historian may have been an eyewitness to some of the events he describes, or at the very least enjoyed access to the archives and battle reports of the royal house of David.
- Redactions: additions by the redactor to harmonize the sources together; many of the uncertain passages may be part of this editing.
- Various: several short sources, none of which have much connection to each other, and are fairly independent of the rest of the text. Many are poems or pure lists.

=== Manuscript sources ===
Four of the Dead Sea Scrolls feature parts of the books of Samuel: 1QSam, found in Qumran Cave 1, contains parts of 2 Samuel; and 4QSam^{a}, 4QSam^{b} and 4QSam^{c}, all found in Qumran Cave 4. Collectively they are known as The Samuel Scroll and date from the 2nd and 1st centuries BCE.

The earliest complete surviving Hebrew copy of the books of Samuel is in the Aleppo Codex (10th century CE). The complete Greek text of Samuel is found in older manuscripts such as the 4th-century Codex Sinaiticus.

== Themes ==
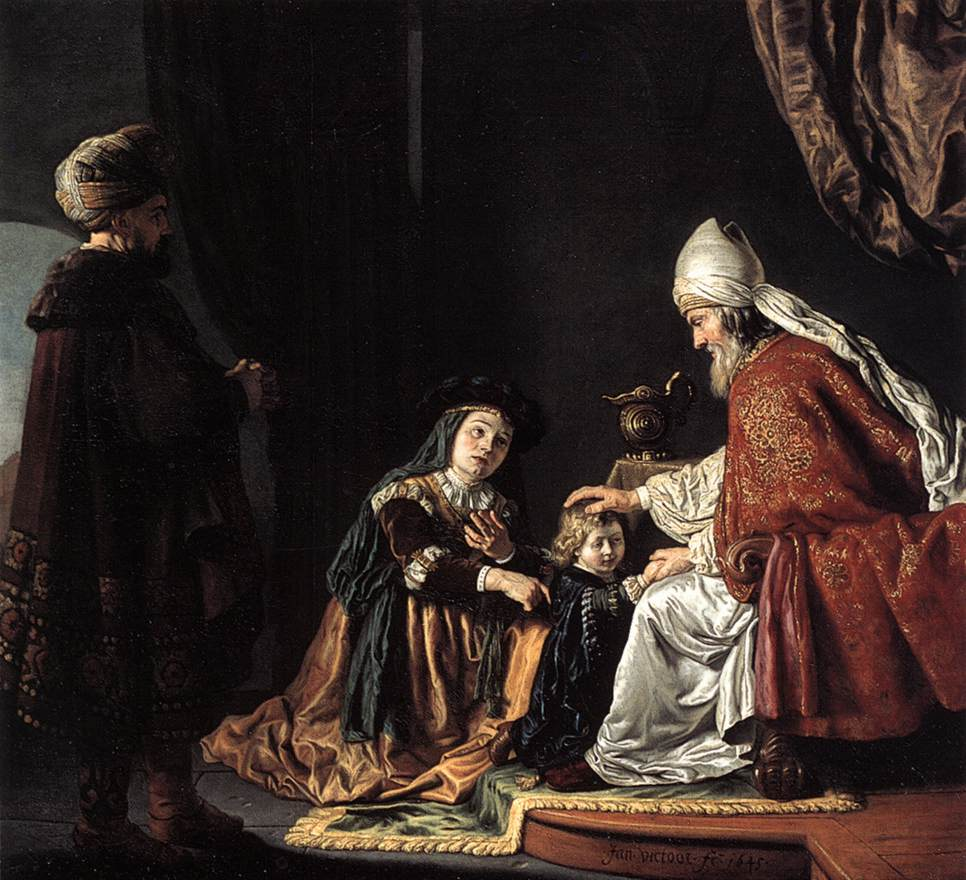
Hannah presenting Samuel to Eli, by Jan Victors, 1645

The Book of Samuel is a theological evaluation of kingship in general and of dynastic kingship and David in particular. The main themes of the book are introduced in the opening poem (the "Song of Hannah"): (1) the sovereignty of YHWH, God of Israel; (2) the reversal of human fortunes; and (3) kingship. These themes are played out in the stories of the three main characters, Samuel, Saul and David.

=== Samuel ===
Samuel answers the description of the "prophet like Moses" predicted in Deuteronomy 18:15–22: like Moses, he has direct contact with God, acts as a judge, and is a perfect leader who never makes mistakes. Samuel's successful defense of the Israelites against their enemies demonstrates that they have no need for a king (who will, moreover, introduce inequality), yet despite this the people demand a king. But the king they are given is God's gift, and Samuel explains that kingship can be a blessing rather than a curse if they remain faithful to their God. On the other hand, total destruction of both king and people will result if they turn to wickedness.

=== Saul ===
Saul is the chosen one: tall, handsome and "goodly", a king appointed by God, and anointed by Samuel, God's prophet, and yet he is ultimately rejected. Saul has two faults which make him unfit for the office of king: carrying out a sacrifice in place of Samuel, and failing to exterminate the Amalekites, in accordance to God's commands, and trying to compensate by claiming that he reserved the surviving Amalekite livestock for sacrifice.

=== David ===
One of the main units within Samuel is the "History of David's Rise", the purpose of which is to justify David as the legitimate successor to Saul. The narrative stresses that he gained the throne lawfully, always respecting "the Lord's anointed" (i.e. Saul) and never taking any of his numerous chances to seize the throne by violence. As God's chosen king over Israel, David is also the son of God ("I will be a father to him, and he shall be a son to me..." – 2 Samuel 7:14). God enters into an eternal covenant (treaty) with David and his line, promising divine protection of the dynasty and of Jerusalem through all time.

2 Samuel 23 contains a prophetic statement described as the "last words of David" (verses 1–7) and details of the 37 "mighty men" who were David's chief warriors (verses 8–39). The Jerusalem Bible states that last words were attributed to David in the style of Jacob and Moses. Its editors note that "the text has suffered considerably and reconstructions are conjectural".

1 Kings 2:1-9 contains David's final words to Solomon, his son and successor as king.

== See also ==
- Biblical judges
- Books of the Kingdoms
- Historicity of the Bible
- History of ancient Israel and Judah
- Kingdom of Israel (Samaria)
- Kingdom of Judah
- Midrash Shmuel (aggadah)

== Notes ==
Books of Samuel History books
| Preceded by Judges | Hebrew Bible | Succeeded by Kings |
| Preceded by Ruth | Christian; Old Testament | Succeeded by Kings |
