= Sons of David =

Biblical sons of the 3rd King of Israel

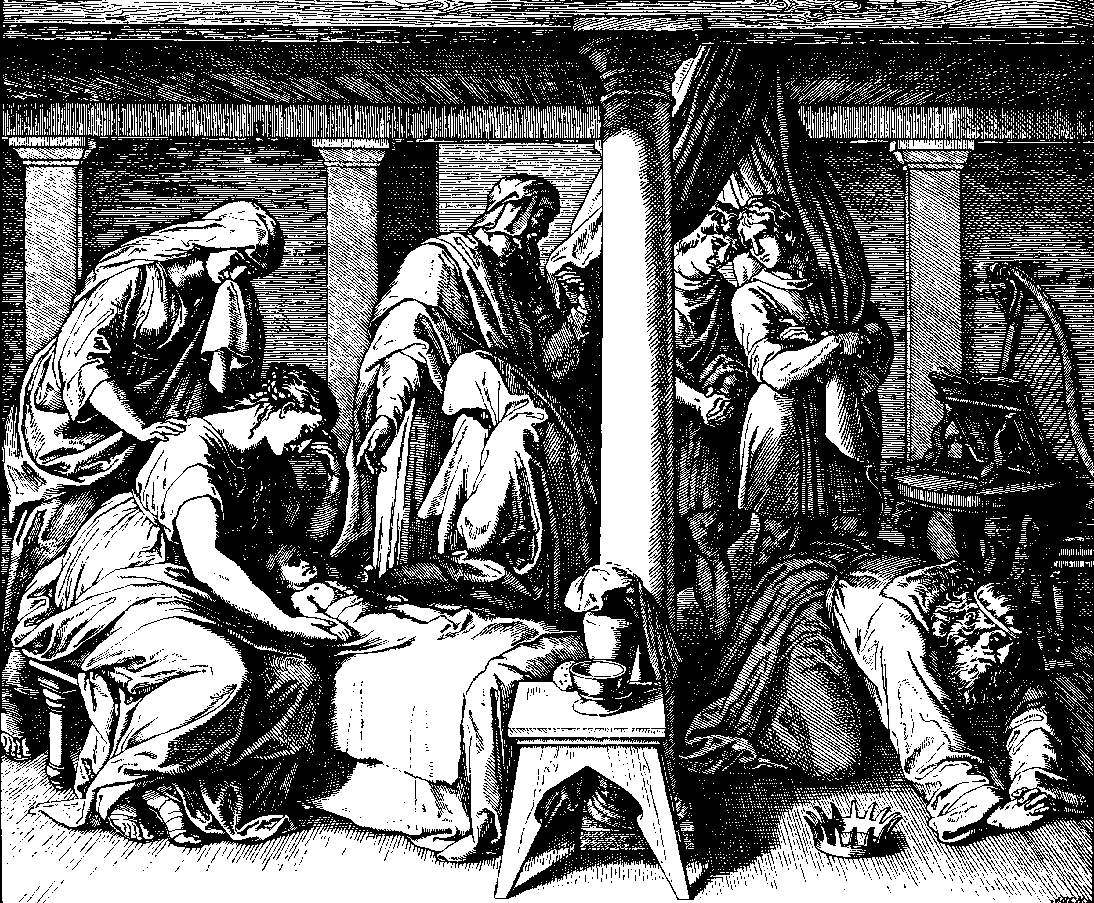
This 1860 woodcut by Julius Schnorr von Karolsfeld depicts the death of Bathsheba's first child with David, who lamented, "I shall go to him, but he will not return to me"(2 Samuel 12:23)

The sons of King David are mentioned both as a group and individually several times in the biblical accounts of the reigns both of David and his successor Solomon.

== Number ==
The number of sons by name in the Bible is 19. In addition, two further unnamed sons are recorded as having been born in Jerusalem, one, probably both, having died in infancy. One of these was the first child born of David's adulterous relationship with Bathsheba.

Only one of David's daughters, Tamar, is mentioned by name.

== Names ==
The named sons are as follows. First those born in Hebron:

- Amnon, David's firstborn, born in Hebron to Ahinoam of Jezreel. Absalom killed him after he raped Absalom's full sister, Tamar.
- Kileab (or Daniel), second son, whose mother was Abigail from Carmel. It is not known what happened to this Daniel.
- Absalom, the third son, born to Maacah, the daughter of Talmai, king of Geshur. He was killed by Joab (1 Chronicles 3:1-2) after he mounted a rebellion against his aging father David.
- Adonijah, the fourth son of King David from Haggith (2 Samuel 3:4). He attempted to usurp the throne during the life of David (1 Kings 1:11ff). Solomon had him executed after being warned to remember his place in the line of succession per King David’s instruction regarding the crown. 1 Kings 1:32–35; 1:50–53; 2:13–25.
- Shephatiah, whose mother was Abital.
- Ithream, whose mother was Eglah, "David’s wife".

The sons born to David in Jerusalem included the sons of Bathsheba:

- The infant who died without being named by Bathsheba
- Shammua, or Shimea, probably the first surviving child of Bathsheba
- Shobab, from Bathsheba
- Nathan, from Bathsheba,
- Solomon, also called Jedediah, whose mother was Bathsheba, the ancestor of Jesus according to the Genealogy of Jesus in Matthew, often considered to be Joseph's line.

Nine other sons were born of other wives:

- Ibhar, Elishua, Elpelet, Nogah, Nepheg, Japhia, Elishama, Eliada, and Eliphelet, and one further unnamed son, who would also have died in infancy.
