= Head of King David =

Twelfth-century French limestone sculpture

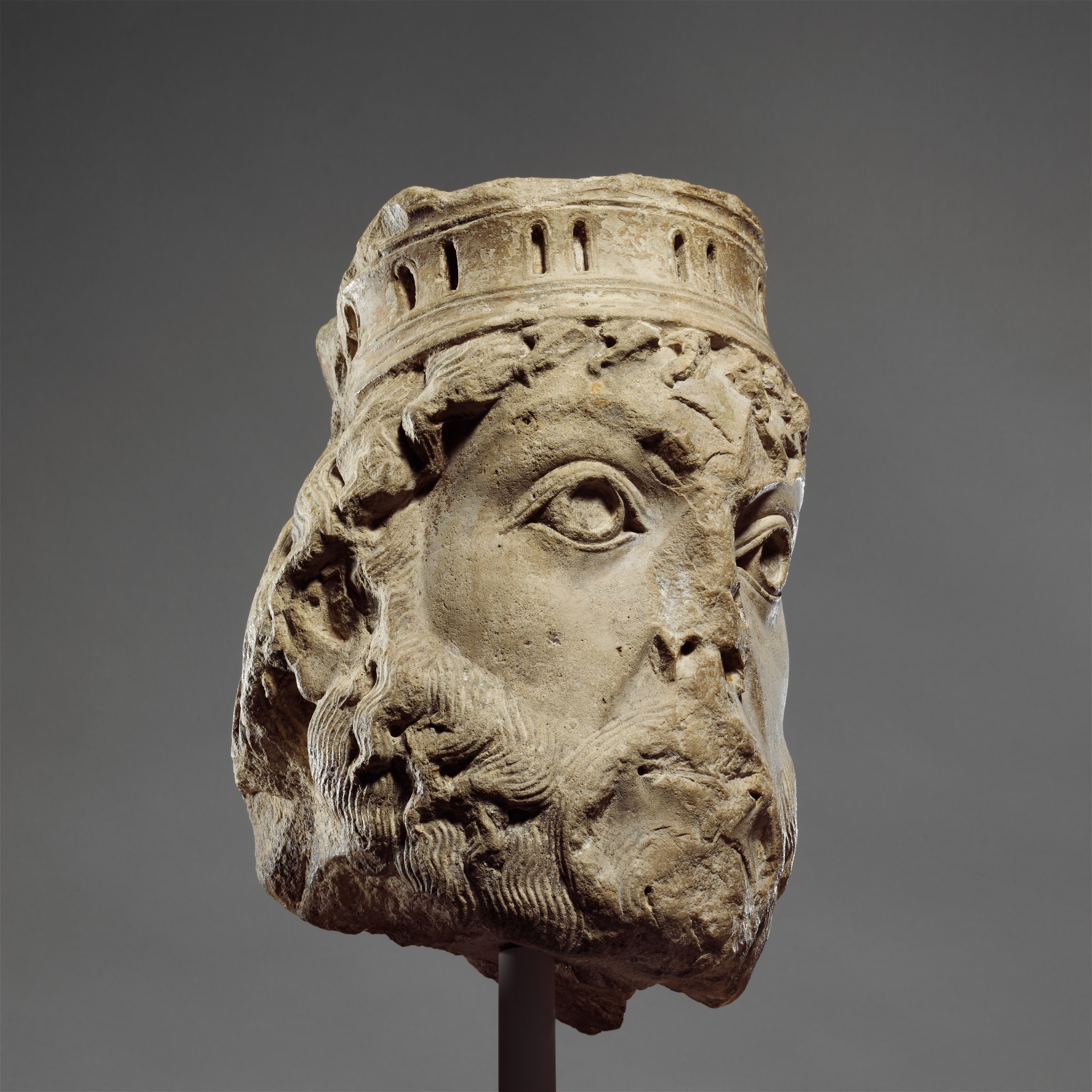
- Front view
- Artist: Unknown
- Year: c. 1145
- Medium: Fine-grained limestone
- Subject: David
- Dimensions: 29.7 cm × 21.1 cm × 21.3 cm (11.7 in × 8.3 in × 8.4 in)
- Location: Metropolitan Museum of Art, New York City
- Accession: 38.180

Head of King David is a limestone sculptural head in the Metropolitan Museum of Art in New York City. The museum dates it to about 1145 and identifies it as the head of the biblical king David from a statue-column on the Saint Anne Portal, the southern portal of the west façade of Notre-Dame de Paris. The portal's programme concerns Saint Anne, the childhood of Jesus and the genealogy of Christ; David appeared among Christ's ancestors on its right jamb.

The head measures 29.7 cm × 21.1 cm × 21.3 cm (11.7 in × 8.3 in × 8.4 in) and weighs 15 kg (33 lb). A corresponding fragment of the figure's body, excavated in Paris in 1977, is held by the Musée de Cluny; its catalogue identifies the Met head as belonging to the same statue.

The Met acquired the head in 1938. James Rorimer published its identification in 1940, relating it to an eighteenth-century engraving of the portal figures. A neutron-activation study published in 1986 challenged the medieval attribution and concluded that the head was probably carved for the Paris art dealer Lucien Demotte from locally quarried stone. Later compositional research reported inconsistencies among three samples from the object and emphasised the difficulties of assigning heterogeneous limestone by small samples. The Metropolitan Museum and the Musée de Cluny continue to catalogue the head as a mid-twelfth-century fragment of the Saint Anne Portal.

== Original setting ==
The Saint Anne Portal is the rightmost of the three portals on the west façade of Notre-Dame. It is the oldest of the three and retains a more Romanesque character than its neighbours. Although installed in the façade of the cathedral around 1200, part of its sculpture had been made roughly fifty years earlier for the building that preceded that of today.

In a 1970 study, the art historian Jacques Thirion argued that the portal had been planned, carved and first installed for the earlier cathedral, then dismantled and remounted on the new façade around 1210. The discovery of carved fragments in Paris in 1977 supported this reconstruction. The Cluny catalogue dates the portal to about 1145–1155 and places it chronologically between the west façade sculpture of the Basilica of Saint-Denis and the Royal Portal of Chartres Cathedral.

Eight statue-columns stood along the portal jambs. The figures now represented on the right are Saint Paul, David, Bathsheba and another king; those on the left are a king, the Queen of Sheba, Solomon and Saint Peter. The nineteenth-century statues at the cathedral are replacements made under the direction of Eugène Viollet-le-Duc. An engraving prepared shortly before 1725 for Bernard de Montfaucon's Les Monumens de la monarchie françoise records the earlier arrangement and later enabled detached fragments to be assigned to individual figures.

== Description and style ==
The head is carved from light, fine-grained limestone associated with the Paris region. It is frontal and nearly life-size, with a broad crown, large almond-shaped eyes, prominent cheekbones, a moustache and a divided beard. Much of the nose, mouth and central surface of the face has been lost. The eyes originally contained inlays; the Met catalogue identifies their material as lead. The scale and emphatic modelling of the features were intended to remain legible when the statue was viewed above eye level.

The hair is organised into compact groups of locks relieved by shallow, undulating chisel cuts. Thirion associated this treatment and the modelling of the face with the sculptor of the Magi on the portal lintel. He also compared the portal figures with sculpture from the Abbey of Saint-Germain-des-Prés, particularly the tomb effigy of Childebert I, while rejecting attribution of the two groups to the same workshop.

William D. Wixom characterised the head's design as combining forceful frontality and Romanesque solidity with softer modelling that anticipates Gothic naturalism. Even in its damaged state, he noted the linear articulation of the crown, hair and beard and the concentration of the design around the face's frontal axis.

== Destruction, acquisition and reconstruction ==
The portal's biblical rulers were long misidentified as members of the French monarchy. During the French Revolution, monumental royal figures at Notre-Dame were attacked as monarchical symbols, and the portal kings were decapitated. The bodies were removed and many of the heads were presumed destroyed. The Montfaucon engraving preserved evidence of the figures' iconography and positions before their destruction.

The Metropolitan Museum acquired the head through the Harris Brisbane Dick Fund in 1938. Its accession number is 38.180. Rorimer's 1940 study identified it with David, the crowned and bearded figure formerly positioned on the southern, or right-hand, jamb of the Saint Anne Portal. The identification was accepted in subsequent reconstructions of the portal programme, and the head was for several decades the only known surviving head associated with that group.

In April 1977, construction work at the former Hôtel Moreau in the 9th arrondissement of Paris uncovered 364 sculptural fragments from the west façade of Notre-Dame. The deposit included portions of all eight statue-columns from the Saint Anne Portal and increased the number of fragments assigned to that portal by twenty-eight.

One excavated fragment was identified from the Montfaucon engraving as the body of David. It had been cut cleanly above the knee and diagonally below the upper garment. The surviving drapery consists of sharp, narrow folds, and a decorated band crosses the robe. The fragment, inventory number Cl. 22896, measures 67 cm × 43 cm × 33 cm (26 in × 17 in × 13 in). The Banque Française du Commerce Extérieur donated it to the Musée de Cluny in 1980.

== Scientific analysis and attribution debate ==
Holmes, Little and Sayre analysed trace elements in medieval limestone sculpture and quarry samples by thermal neutron activation for a 1986 study. Their comparison included the Met head, the excavated David body and other Parisian and Burgundian objects. They rejected the established origin proposed for the head and wrote that it was probably produced for Lucien Demotte using stone quarried locally in Paris. The conclusion implied a modern date and called the established identification into question.

A 1994 study by Holmes, Harbottle and Blanc returned to the head while refining the method of compositional fingerprinting. Three samples taken from the sculpture did not fall into a single compositional group. The authors used the case to illustrate the effects of natural variation within limestone and the need to combine chemical measurements with stylistic, iconographic and geological evidence.

The later museum catalogues have not adopted the proposed modern dating. The Metropolitan Museum lists the work as French, made in Paris about 1145, and the Musée de Cluny catalogue joins it to the excavated body of David. Both identify the original location as the right jamb of the Saint Anne Portal.

== Exhibitions and display ==
The head was included with newly excavated Notre-Dame fragments in Sculpture from Notre-Dame, Paris: A Dramatic Discovery, shown at the Metropolitan Museum of Art from 6 September to 25 November 1979 and at the Cleveland Museum of Art from 15 December 1979 to 27 January 1980. It was also displayed in the Met exhibition Set in Stone: The Face in Medieval Sculpture in 2006–2007, where it was catalogued as a Parisian work of about 1145 from the south portal of Notre-Dame's west façade. As of August 2026, it is exhibited in Gallery 304 at The Met Fifth Avenue.
