= David =

Biblical figure and Israelite monarch

David 𐤃𐤅𐤃 דָּוִד
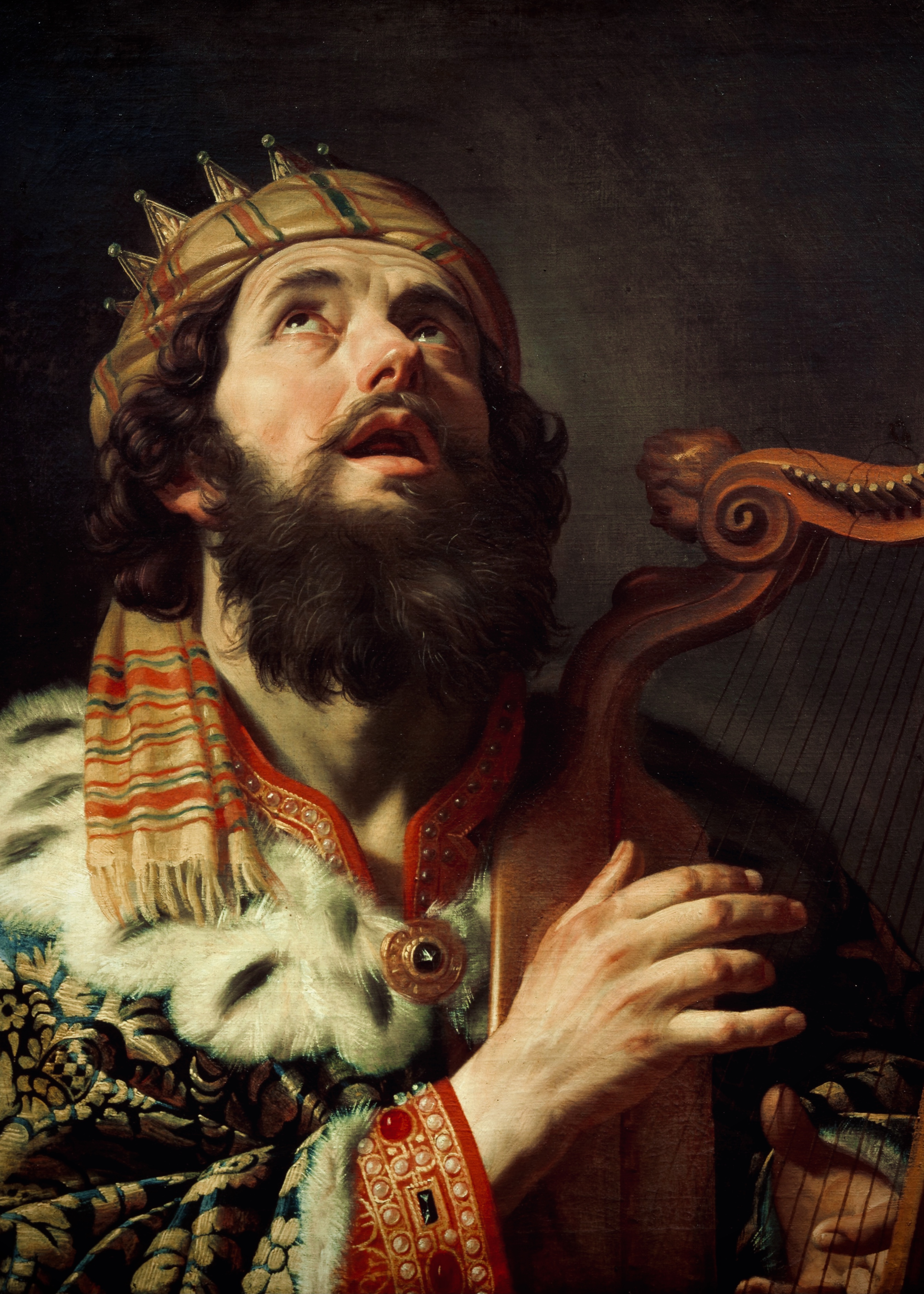
- King David Playing the Harp (1622) by Gerard van Honthorst

King of Israel
- Reign: 9th or 10th century BC
- Predecessor: Ish-Bosheth
- Successor: Solomon
- Consort: at least 8 wives: Michal; Ahinoam; Abigail; Maachah; Haggith; Abital; Eglah; Bathsheba
- Issue: 18+ children, including: Amnon; Chileab; Absalom; Adonijah; Shephatiah; Ithream; Shammua; Shobab; Nathan; Solomon; Ibhar; Elishua; Eliphalet; Nogah; Nepheg; Japhia; Elishama; Elyada; Jerimoth; Tamar
- House: House of David
- Father: Jesse
- Mother: Nizzebeth (acc. Judaism)

David (/ˈdeɪ.vɪd/; Hebrew: דָּוִד, romanized: Dāwiḏ, "beloved one") (Note: Arabic: داود (traditional spelling), داوود, Dāwūd; Koine Greek: Δαυίδ, romanized: Dauíd; Latin: Davidus, David; Ge'ez: ዳዊት, Dawit; Old Armenian: Դաւիթ, Dawitʿ; Church Slavonic: Давíдъ, Davidŭ; possibly meaning "beloved one".) was a legendary leader of the Tribe of Judah who became the second king of the united Kingdom of Israel, according to the Hebrew Bible.

David's reign may have occurred around the 9th century BC, although the timeframe of his reign and geographical boundaries of his kingdom are disputed. Most of what is known of David comes from biblical literature, the historicity of which has been extensively challenged, and there is little detail about David that is concrete and undisputed. Debates persist over several controversial issues: whether the story serves as a political defence of David's dynasty against accusations of tyranny, murder and regicide; the relationship between David and Jonathan; whether the text is a Homer-like heroic tale adopting elements from its Ancient Near East parallels; and whether elements of the text date as late as the Hasmonean period.

In the biblical narrative of Samuel, David is portrayed as a young shepherd and harpist devoted to God who becomes a hero by killing the Philistine Goliath. After falling out with King Saul, David goes into hiding; following Saul and Jonathan’s deaths, he becomes king first of Judah and eventually all Israel. He conquers Jerusalem, makes it the capital, and brings the Ark there. After committing adultery with Bathsheba and arranging her husband Uriah’s death, David survives his son Absalom’s rebellion and continues to reign. Denied permission to build God's temple because of his bloodshed, David dies at 70 and names Solomon, his son with Bathsheba, as successor. He is portrayed as an ideal king and ancestor of the future Hebrew Messiah, with many psalms attributed to him.

David is also richly represented in post-biblical Jewish written and oral tradition and referenced in the New Testament. Early Christians interpreted the life of Jesus of Nazareth in light of references to the Hebrew Messiah and to David; Jesus is described as being directly descended from David in the Gospel of Matthew and the Gospel of Luke. In the Quran and hadith, David is described as an Israelite king as well as a prophet of God. The biblical David has inspired many interpretations in art and literature over the centuries.

== Biblical account ==
=== Family ===
The First Book of Samuel and the First Book of Chronicles both identify David as the son of Jesse, the Bethlehemite, the youngest of eight sons. He also had at least two sisters: Zeruiah, whose sons all went on to serve in David's army, and Abigail, whose son Amasa served in Absalom's army, Absalom being one of David's younger sons. While the Bible does not name his mother, the Talmud identifies her as Nitzevet, a daughter of a man named Adael, and the Book of Ruth claims him as the great-grandson of Ruth, the Moabite, by Boaz.

David is described as cementing his relations with various political and national groups through marriage. According to 1 Samuel 17:25, King Saul said that he would make whoever killed Goliath a very wealthy man, give his daughter to him and declare his father's family exempt from taxes in Israel. Saul offered David his eldest daughter, Merab, a marriage David respectfully declined. Saul then gave Merab in marriage to Adriel the Meholathite. Having been told that his younger daughter Michal was in love with David, Saul gave her in marriage to David upon David's payment in Philistine foreskins (ancient Jewish historian Josephus lists the dowry as 100 Philistine heads). Saul became jealous of David and tried to have him killed. David escaped. Then Saul sent Michal to Galim to marry Palti, son of Laish. David then took wives in Hebron, according to 2 Samuel 3; they were Ahinoam the Yizre'elite; Abigail, the widow of Nabal the Carmelite; Maacah, the daughter of Talmay, king of Geshur; Haggith; Abital; and Eglah. Later, David wanted Michal back and Abner, Ish-bosheth's army commander, delivered her to him, causing Palti great grief.

The Book of Chronicles lists his sons with his various wives and concubines. In Hebron, David had six sons: Amnon, by Ahinoam; Daniel, by Abigail; Absalom, by Maachah; Adonijah, by Haggith; Shephatiah, by Abital; and Ithream, by Eglah (1 Chronicles 3:1–3). By Bathsheba, his sons were Shammua, Shobab, Nathan, and Solomon. David's sons born in Jerusalem of his other wives included Ibhar, Elishua, Eliphelet, Nogah, Nepheg, Japhia, Elishama and Eliada (2 Samuel 5:14–16). Jerimoth, who is not mentioned in any of the genealogies, is mentioned as another of his sons in 2 Chronicles 2 11:18. His daughter Tamar, by Maachah, is raped by her half-brother Amnon. David fails to bring Amnon to justice for his violation of Tamar, because he is his firstborn and he loves him, and so Absalom (her full brother) kills Amnon to avenge Tamar.

=== Narrative ===
God is angered when Saul, Israel's king, unlawfully offers a sacrifice and later disobeys a divine command both to kill all of the Amalekites and to destroy their confiscated property. Consequently, God sends the prophet Samuel to anoint a shepherd, David, the youngest son of Jesse of Bethlehem, to be king instead.

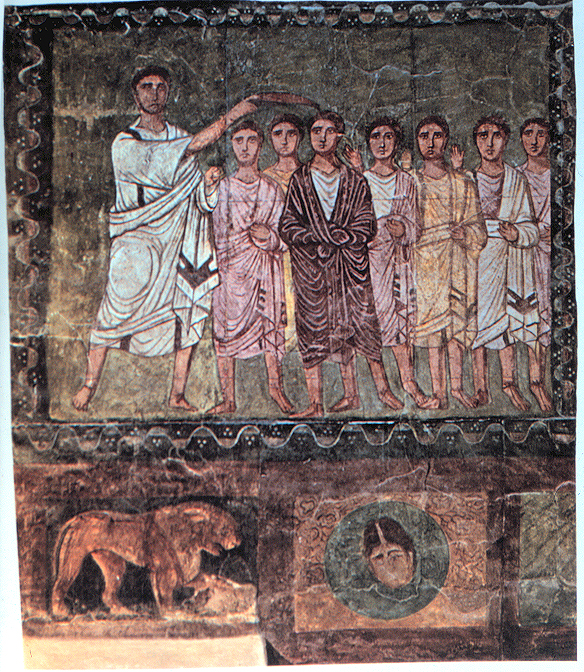
Samuel anoints David, Dura-Europos synagogue, now in Syria, 3rd century AD.

After God sends an evil spirit to torment Saul, his servants recommend that he send for a man skilled in playing the lyre. A servant proposes David, whom the servant describes as "skillful in playing, a man of valor, a warrior, prudent in speech, and a man of good presence; and the Lord is with him." David enters Saul's service as one of the royal armour-bearers and plays the lyre to soothe the king.

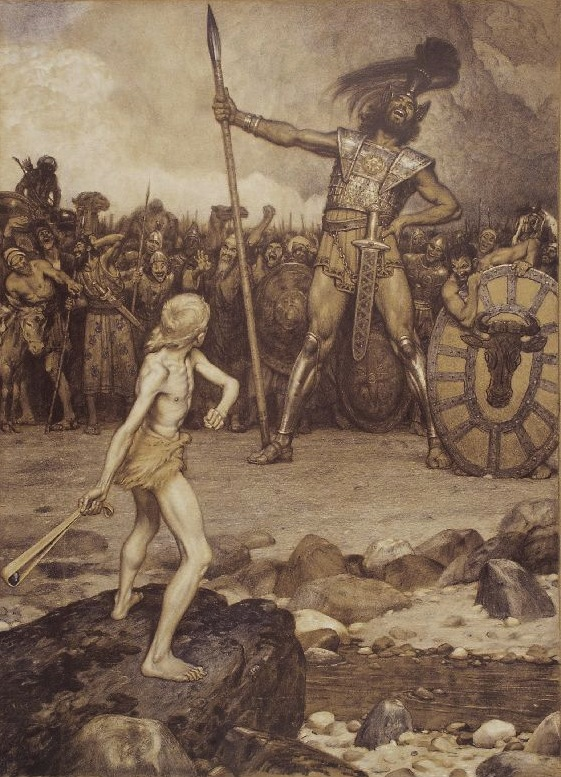
David and Goliath (1888), colour lithograph by German artist Osmar Schindler

War comes between Israel and the Philistines, and the giant Goliath challenges the Israelites to send out a champion to face him in single combat. David, sent by his father to bring provisions to his brothers serving in Saul's army, declares that he can defeat Goliath. Refusing the king's offer of the royal armour, he kills Goliath with his sling. Saul inquires the name of the young hero's father.

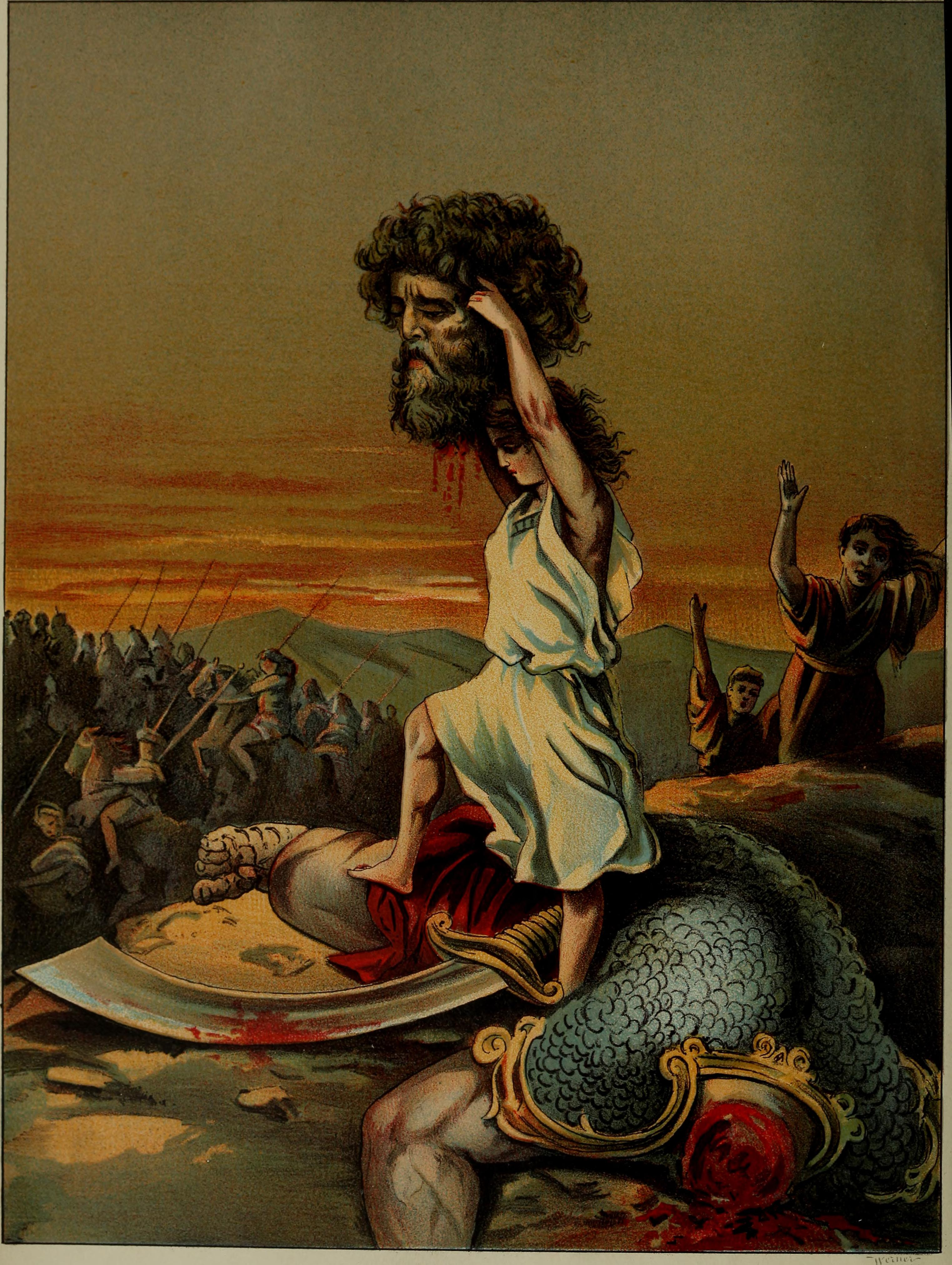
David raises the head of Goliath, Gustave Doré's illustration (1866), colorized and published in Josephine Pollard's Sweet stories of God (1899).

Saul sets David over his army. All Israel loves David, but his popularity causes Saul to fear him ("What else can he wish but the kingdom?"). Saul plots his death, but Saul's son Jonathan, who loves David, warns him of his father's schemes and David flees. He goes first to Nob, where he is fed by the priest Ahimelech and given Goliath's sword, and then to Gath, the Philistine city of Goliath, intending to seek refuge with King Achish there. Achish's servants or officials question his loyalty, and David sees that he is in danger there. To not alert Achish or his servants of his presence, he pretends to be crazy, allowing him to go free. He goes next to the cave of Adullam, where his family joins him. From there he goes to seek refuge with the king of Moab, but the prophet Gad advises him to leave and he goes to the Forest of Hereth, and then to Keilah, where he is involved in a further battle with the Philistines. Saul plans to besiege Keilah so that he can capture David, so David leaves the city to protect its inhabitants. From there he takes refuge in the mountainous Wilderness of Ziph.

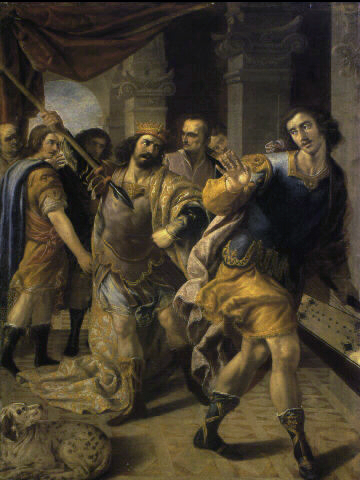
Saul threatening David, by José Leonardo

Jonathan meets with David again and confirms his loyalty to David as the future king. After the people of Ziph notify Saul that David is taking refuge in their territory, Saul seeks confirmation and plans to capture David in the Wilderness of Maon, but his attention is diverted by a renewed Philistine invasion and David is able to secure some respite at Ein Gedi. Returning from battle with the Philistines, Saul heads to Ein Gedi in pursuit of David. Needing privacy "to attend to his needs", Saul enters the cave where, as it happens, David and his supporters are hiding. David realizes he has an opportunity to kill Saul, but instead, he secretly cuts off a piece of Saul's robe. When Saul leaves the cave, David comes out to pay homage to the king, and to demonstrate using the piece of robe that he holds no malice towards him. The two are thus reconciled and Saul recognizes David as his successor.

A similar passage occurs in 1 Sam 26, when David is able to infiltrate Saul's camp on the hill of Hachilah and remove his spear and a jug of water from his side while he and his guards lie asleep. In this account, David is advised by Abishai that this is his opportunity to kill Saul, but David declines, saying he will not "stretch out [his] hand against the Lord's anointed". In the morning, David once again demonstrates to Saul that, despite ample opportunity, he did not deign to harm him. Saul, despite having already reconciled with David, confesses that he has been wrong to pursue David, and blesses him.

In 1 Samuel 27:1–4, David begins to doubt Saul's sincerity, and reasons that the king will eventually make another attempt on his life. David appeals to king Achish of Gath to grant him and his family sanctuary. Achish agrees, and upon hearing that David has fled to Philistia, Saul ceases to pursue him, though no such pursuit seemed to be in progress at the time. Achish permits David to reside in Ziklag, close to the border between Philistia and Judah. To further ingratiate himself to Achish and the Philistines, David and his men raid the Geshurites, the Girzites, and the Amalekites, but lead the royal court to believe they are attacking the Israelites, the Jerahmeelites, and the Kenites. While Achish comes to believe that David had become a loyal vassal, the princes (or lords) of Gath remain unconvinced, and at their request, Achish instructs David to remain behind to guard the camp when the Philistines march against Saul. David returns to Ziklag and saves his wives and the citizens from an Amalekite raid. Jonathan and Saul are killed in battle with the Philistines, and after hearing of their deaths, David travels to Hebron, where he is anointed king over Judah. In the north, Saul's son Ish-Bosheth is anointed king of Israel, and war ensues until Ish-Bosheth is murdered.

With the death of Saul's son, the elders of Israel come to Hebron and David is anointed king over all of Israel. He conquers Jerusalem, previously a Jebusite stronghold, and makes it his capital. He brings the Ark of the Covenant to the city, intending to build a temple for God, but the prophet Nathan forbids it, prophesying that the temple would be built by one of David's sons. Nathan also prophesies that God has made a covenant with the house of David stating, "your throne shall be established forever". David wins additional victories over the Philistines, Moabites, Edomites, Amalekites, Ammonites and king Hadadezer of Aram-Zobah, after which they become tributaries. His fame increases as a result, earning the praise of figures like King Toi of Hamath, Hadadezer's rival.

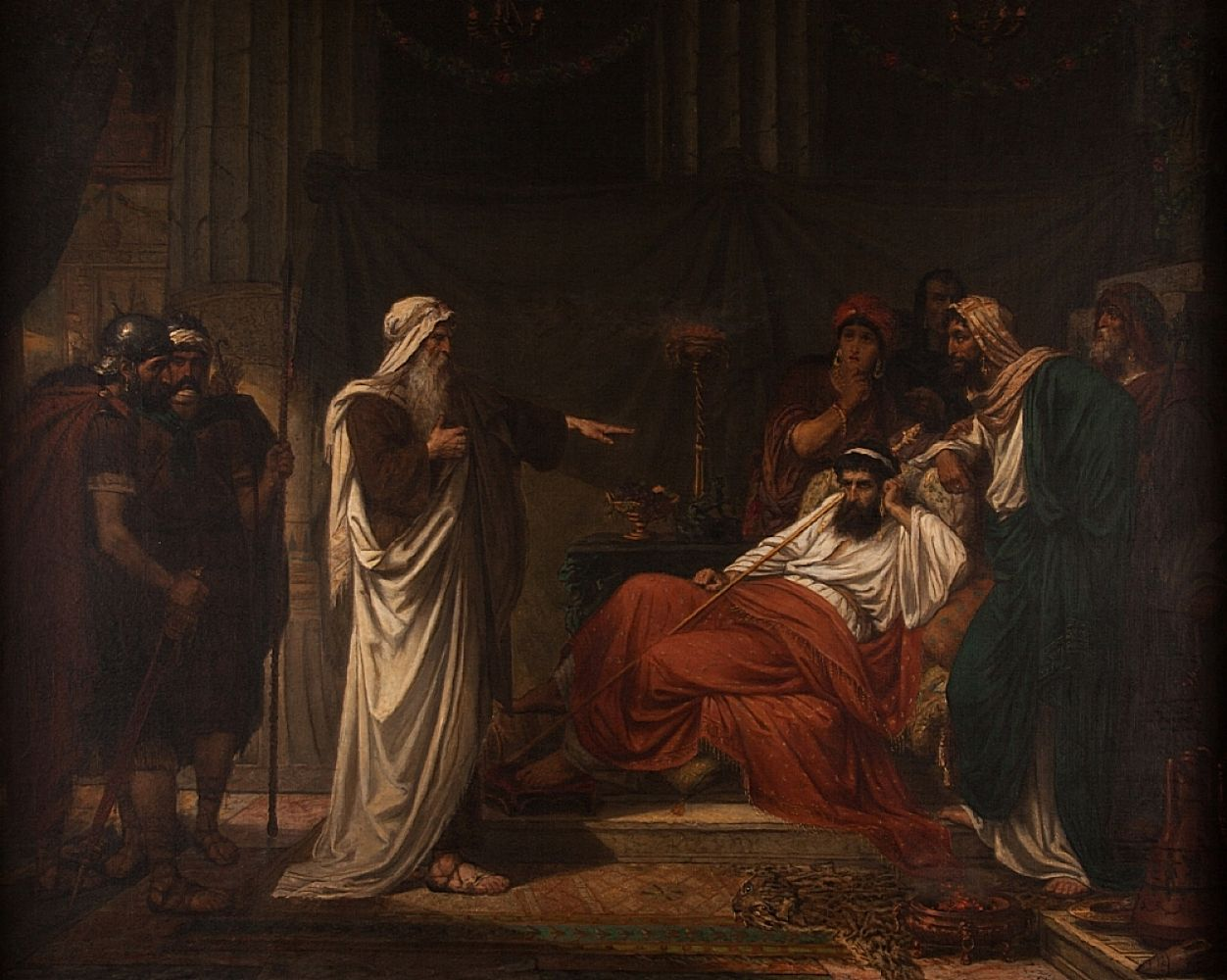
The Prophet Nathan rebukes King David, oil on canvas by Eugène Siberdt, 1866–1931 (Mayfair Gallery, London)

During a siege of the Ammonite capital of Rabbah, David remains in Jerusalem. He spies a woman, Bathsheba, bathing and summons her; she becomes pregnant. The text in the Bible does not explicitly state whether Bathsheba consented to sex with David. David calls her husband, Uriah the Hittite, back from the battle to rest, hoping that he will go home to have sex with his wife and the child will be presumed to be his. Uriah does not visit his wife, however, so David conspires to have him killed in the heat of battle. David then marries the widowed Bathsheba.

In response, Nathan, after trapping the king in his guilt with a parable that actually described his sin in analogy, prophesies the punishment that will fall upon him, stating "the sword shall never depart from your house." (Note: Some commentators believe this meant during David's lifetime. Others say it included his posterity.) When David acknowledges that he has sinned, Nathan advises him that his sin is forgiven and he will not die, but the child will. In fulfilment of Nathan's words, the child born of the union between David and Bathsheba dies, and another of David's sons, Absalom, fuelled by vengeance and lust for power, rebels. Thanks to Hushai, a friend of David who was ordered to infiltrate Absalom's court to successfully sabotage his plans, Absalom's forces are routed at the battle of the Wood of Ephraim, and he is caught by his long hair in the branches of a tree where, contrary to David's order, he is killed by Joab, the commander of David's army. David laments the death of his favourite son: "O my son Absalom, my son, my son Absalom! Would I had died instead of you, O Absalom, my son, my son!" until Joab persuades him to recover from "the extravagance of his grief" and to fulfill his duty to his people. David returns to Gilgal and is escorted across the River Jordan and back to Jerusalem by the tribes of Judah and Benjamin.

When David is old and bedridden, Adonijah, his eldest surviving son and natural heir, declares himself king. Bathsheba and Nathan go to David and obtain his agreement to crown Bathsheba's son Solomon as king, according to David's earlier promise, and the revolt of Adonijah is put down. David dies at the age of 70 after reigning for 40 years, and on his deathbed counsels Solomon to walk in the ways of God and to take revenge on his enemies.

=== Psalms ===
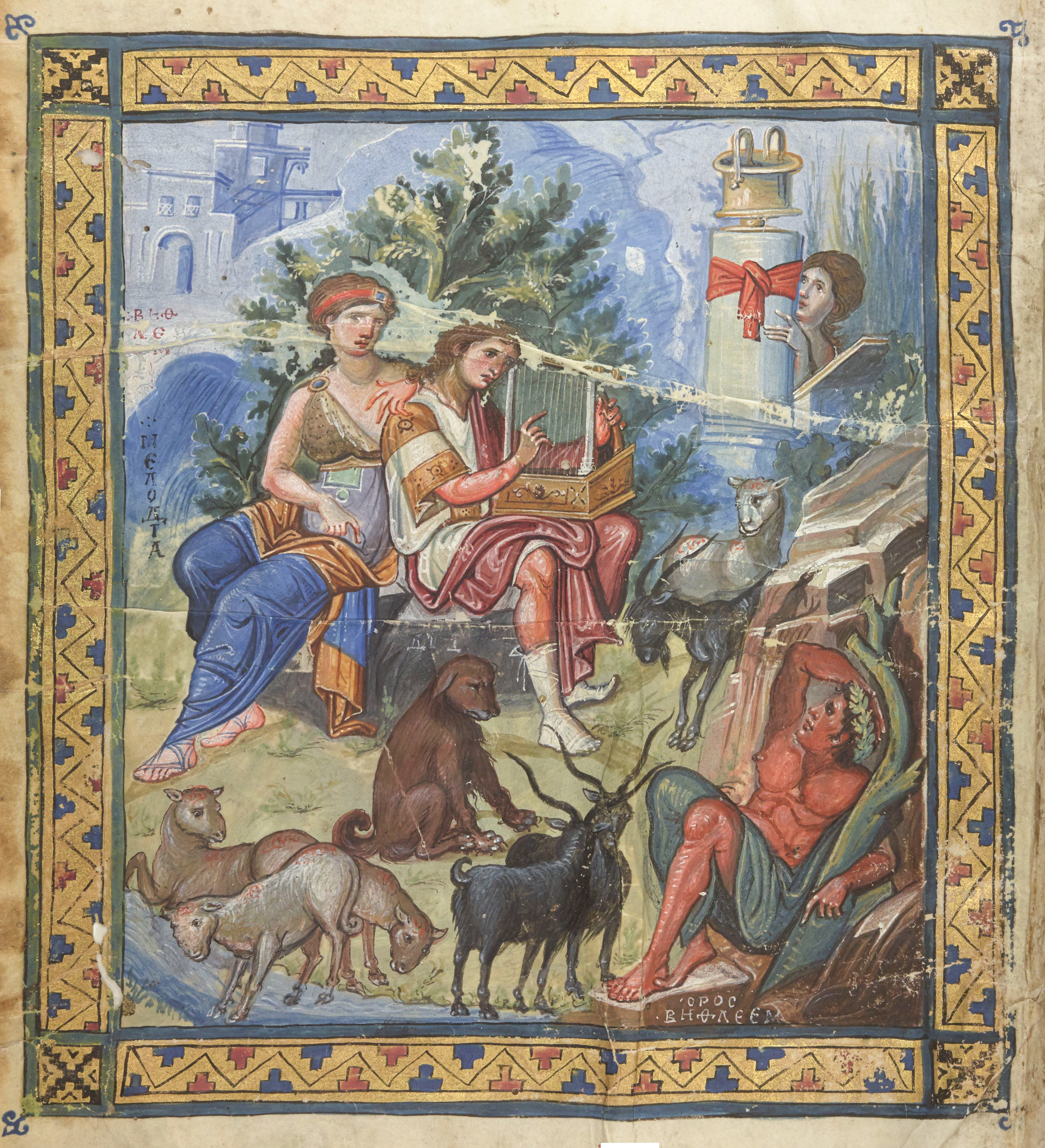
David Composing the Psalms, Paris Psalter, 10th century

The Book of Samuel calls David a skillful harp (lyre) player and "the sweet psalmist of Israel." (Note: Other translations say, "the hero of Israel's songs", "the favorite singer of Israel", "the contented psalm writer of Israel", and "Israel's beloved singer of songs".) Yet, while almost half of the Psalms are headed "A Psalm of David" (also translated as "to David" or "for David") and tradition identifies several with specific events in David's life (e.g., Psalms 3, 7, 18, 34, 51, 52, 54, 56, 57, 59, 60, 63 and 142), the headings are late additions and no psalm can be attributed to David with certainty.

Psalm 34 is attributed to David on the occasion of his escape from Abimelech (or King Achish) by pretending to be insane. According to the parallel narrative in 1 Samuel 21, instead of killing the man who had exacted so many casualties from him, Abimelech allows David to leave, exclaiming, "Am I so short of madmen that you have to bring this fellow here to carry on like this in front of me? Must this man come into my house?"

== Interpretation in Abrahamic tradition ==
=== Rabbinic Judaism ===
David is an important figure in Rabbinic Judaism, with many legends about him. According to one tradition, David was raised as the son of his father Jesse and spent his early years herding his father's sheep in the wilderness while his brothers were in school.

David's adultery with Bathsheba is interpreted as an opportunity to demonstrate the power of repentance, and the Talmud says it was not adultery at all, citing a Jewish practice of divorce on the eve of battle. Furthermore, according to Talmudic sources, Uriah's death was not murder, because Uriah had committed a capital offence by refusing to obey a direct command from the King. However, in tractate Sanhedrin, David expressed remorse over his transgressions and sought forgiveness. God ultimately forgave David and Bathsheba but would not remove their sins from Scripture.

In Jewish legend, David's sin with Bathsheba is the punishment for David's excessive self-consciousness. He had besought God to lead him into temptation so that he might give proof of his constancy like Abraham, Isaac, and Jacob, who successfully passed the test and whose names later were united with God's, while David failed through the temptation of a woman.

According to midrashim, Adam gave up 70 years of his life for the life of David. Also, according to the Talmud Yerushalmi, David was born and died on the Jewish holiday of Shavuot (Feast of Weeks). His piety was said to be so great that his prayers could bring down things from Heaven.

=== Christianity ===
King David the Prophet
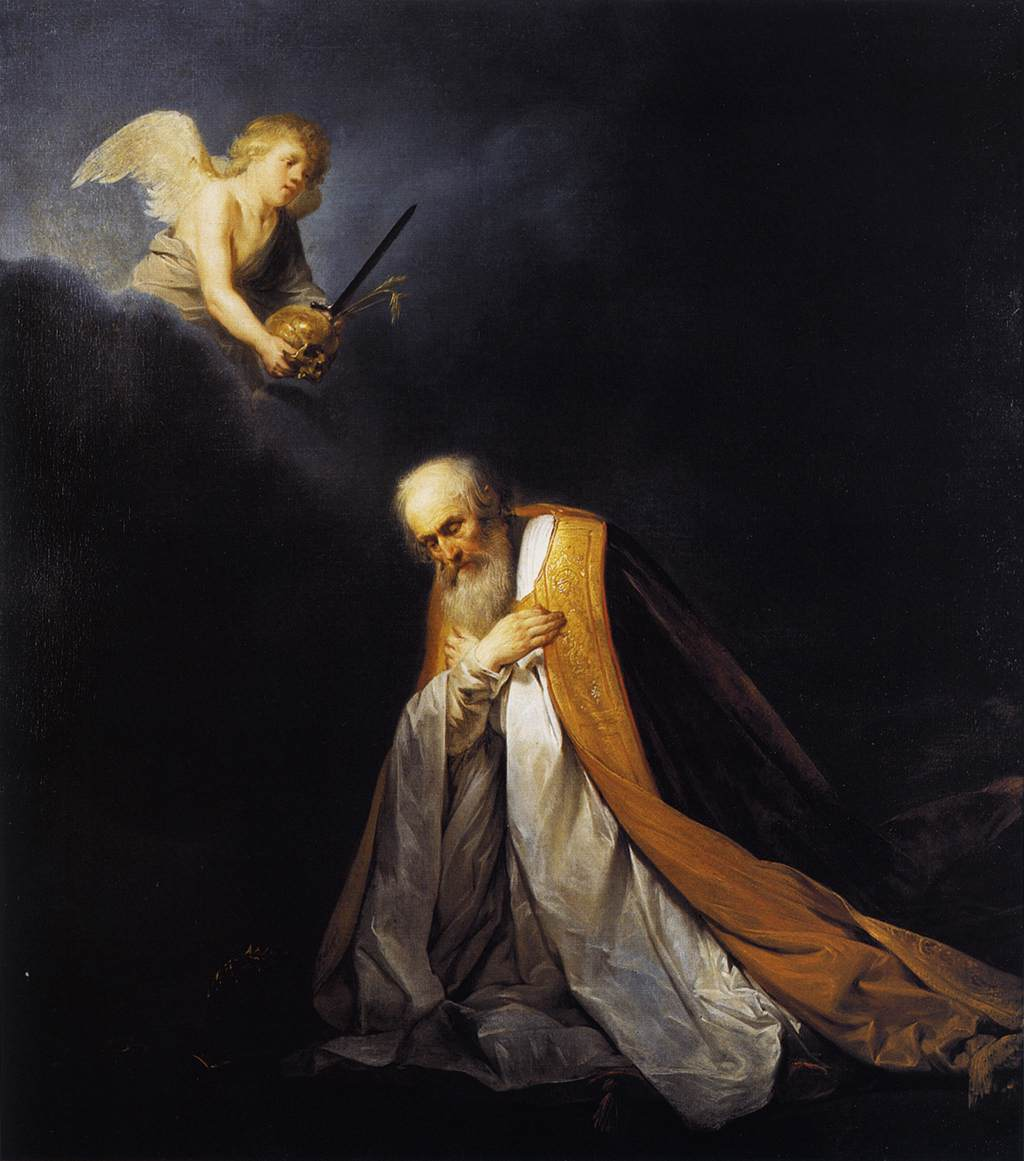
- King David in Prayer, by Pieter de Grebber (c. 1640)

Holy Monarch, Prophet, Reformer, Spiritual Poet and musician, Vicegerent of God, Psalm-Receiver
- Venerated in: Catholic Church; Eastern Orthodoxy; Oriental Orthodoxy
- Feast: 29, 6 December October – Catholicism
- Attributes: Psalms, Harp, Head of Goliath

The Messiah concept is fundamental in Christianity. Originally an earthly king ruling by divine appointment ("the anointed one", as the title Messiah had it), in the last two centuries BC the "son of David" became the apocalyptic and heavenly one who would deliver Israel and usher in a new kingdom. This was the background to the concept of Messiahship in early Christianity, which interpreted the career of Jesus "by means of the titles and functions assigned to David in the mysticism of the Zion cult, in which he served as priest-king and in which he was the mediator between God and man".

The early Church believed that "the life of David foreshadowed the life of Christ; Bethlehem is the birthplace of both; the shepherd life of David points out Christ, the Good Shepherd; the five stones chosen to slay Goliath are typical of the five wounds; the betrayal by his trusted counsellor, Ahitophel, and the passage over the Cedron remind us of Christ's Sacred Passion. Many of the Davidic Psalms, as we learn from the New Testament, are clearly typical of the future Messiah." In the Middle Ages, "Charlemagne thought of himself, and was viewed by his court scholars, as a 'new David'. [This was] not in itself a new idea, but [one whose] content and significance were greatly enlarged by him".

Western Christian churches celebrate David's feast day on 29 December or 6 October, Eastern-rite on 19 December. The Eastern Orthodox and Eastern Catholic Churches celebrate the feast day of the "Holy Righteous Prophet and King David" on the Sunday of the Holy Forefathers (two Sundays before the Great Feast of the Nativity of the Lord) and on the Sunday of the Holy Fathers (Sunday before the Nativity), when he is commemorated together with other ancestors of Jesus. He is also commemorated on the Sunday after the Nativity, together with Joseph and James, the Brother of the Lord and on 26 December (Synaxis of the Mother of God).

==== Middle Ages ====
Coat of arms attributed to King David by mediaeval heralds. (Identical to the arms of Ireland)

In European Christian culture of the Middle Ages, David was made a member of the Nine Worthies, a group of heroes encapsulating all the ideal qualities of chivalry. His life was thus proposed as a valuable subject for study by those aspiring to chivalric status. This aspect of David in the Nine Worthies was popularized first through literature, and thereafter adopted as a frequent subject for painters and sculptors.

David was considered a model ruler and a symbol of divinely ordained monarchy throughout medieval Western Europe and Eastern Christendom. He was perceived as the biblical predecessor to Christian Roman and Byzantine emperors and the name "New David" was used as an honorific reference to these rulers. The Georgian Bagratids and the Solomonic dynasty of Ethiopia claimed direct biological descent from him. Likewise, kings of the Frankish Carolingian dynasty frequently connected themselves to David; Charlemagne himself occasionally used "David" his pseudonym.

=== Islam ===
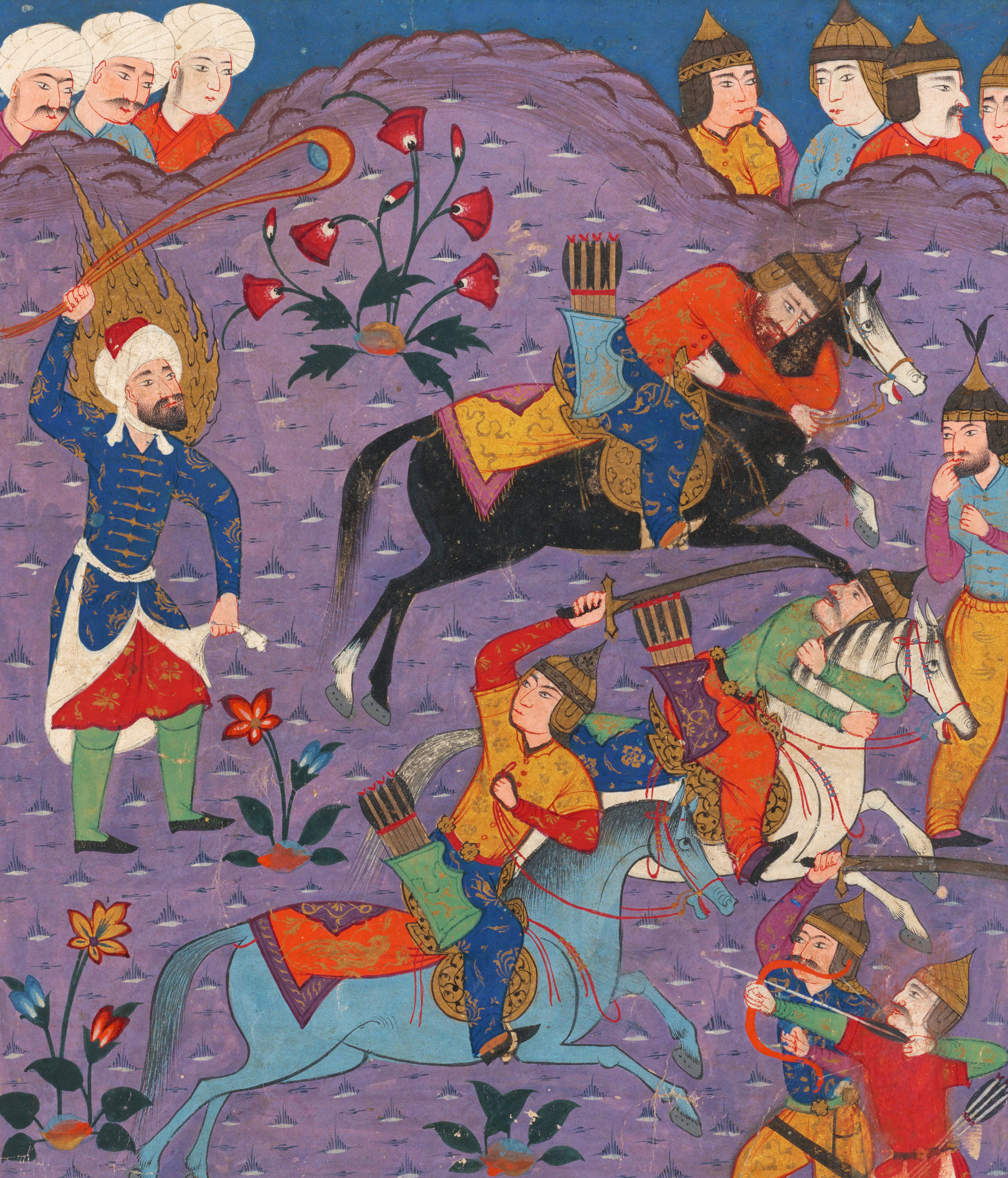
Islamic miniature depicting Dawud besting the army of Jalut with a slingshot from a 1580 Persian Stories of the Prophets manuscript.

David (Arabic: داوود Dā'ūd or Dāwūd) is an important figure in Islam as one of the major prophets God sent to guide the Israelites. He is mentioned several times in the Quran with the Arabic name داود, Dāwūd or Dā'ūd, often with his son Solomon. In the Quran, David killed Goliath (Q2:251), a giant soldier in the Philistine army. When David killed Goliath, God granted him kingship and wisdom and enforced it (Q38:20). David was made God's "vicegerent on earth" (Q38:26) and God further gave David sound judgement (Q21:78; Q37:21–24, Q26) as well as the Psalms, regarded as books of divine wisdom (Q4:163; Q17:55). The birds and mountains united with David in uttering praise to God (Q21:79; Q34:10; Q38:18), while God made iron soft for David (Q34:10), God also instructed David in the art of fashioning chain mail out of iron (Q21:80); this knowledge gave David a major advantage over his bronze and cast iron-armed opponents, not to mention the cultural and economic impact. Together with Solomon, David gave judgement in a case of damage to the fields (Q21:78) and David judged the matter between two disputants in his prayer chamber (Q38:21–23). Since there is no mention in the Quran of the wrong David did to Uriah nor any reference to Bathsheba, Muslims reject this narrative.

Muslim tradition and the hadith stress David's zeal in daily prayer as well as in fasting. Quran commentators, historians and compilers of the numerous Stories of the Prophets elaborate upon David's concise quranic narratives and specifically mention David's gift in singing his Psalms, his beautiful recitation, and his vocal talents. His voice is described as having a captivating power, weaving its influence not only over man but over all beasts and nature, who would unite with him to praise God.

== Historicity ==
=== Literary analysis ===
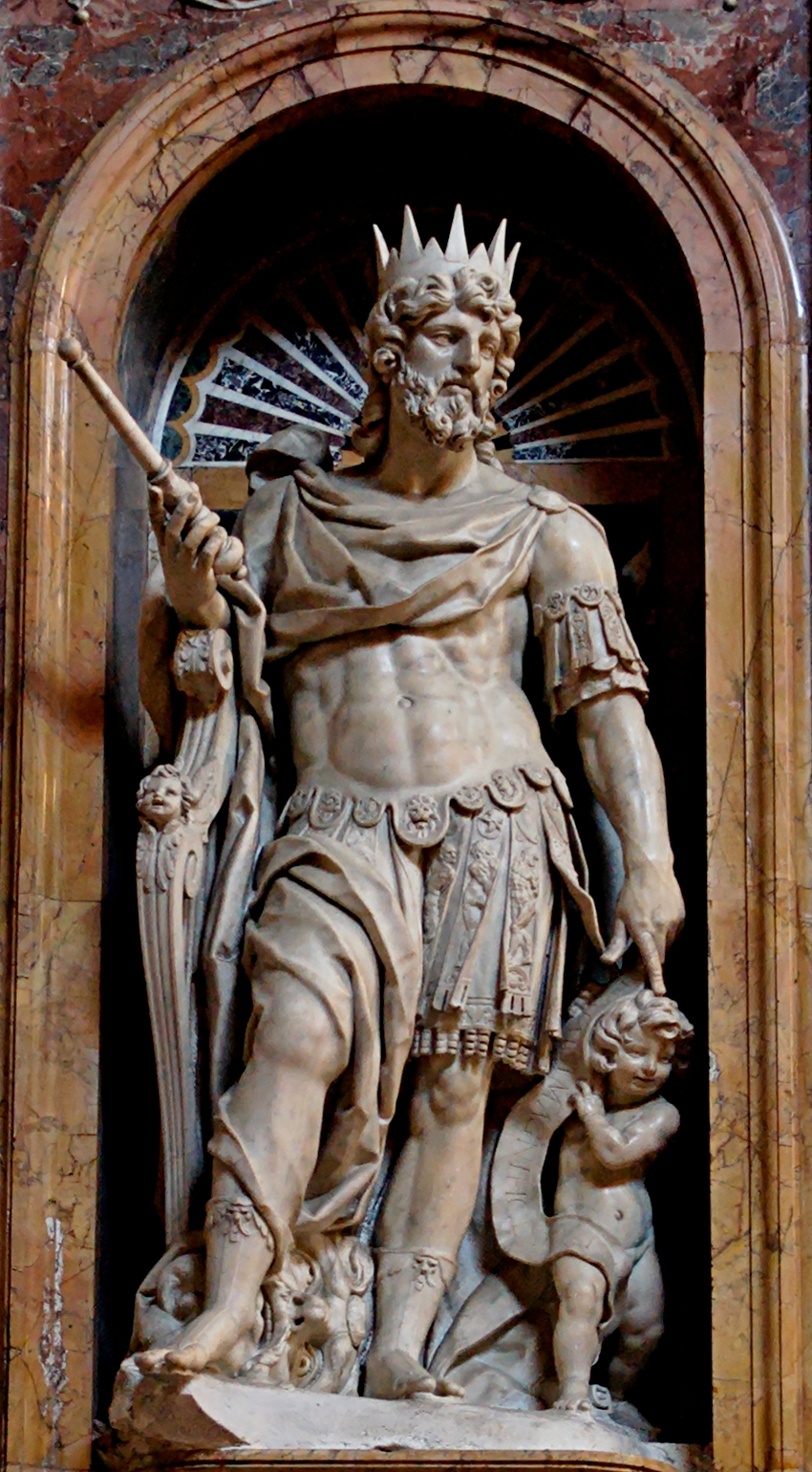
Statue of David (1609–1612) by Nicolas Cordier

The only sources directly attesting to David's life are from biblical literature. Some scholars believe that the Books of Samuel were substantially composed during the time of Josiah, king of Judah, at the end of the 7th century BC, extended during the Babylonian captivity and substantially complete by about 550 BC. Old Testament scholar A. Graeme Auld contends that further editing was done even after then—the silver quarter-shekel Saul's servant offers to Samuel in 1 Samuel 9:8 "almost certainly fixes the date of the story in the Persian or Hellenistic period" because a quarter-shekel was known to exist in Hasmonean times. The authors and editors of Samuel drew on many earlier sources, including, for their history of David, the "history of David's rise" and the "succession narrative". The Books of Chronicles, which tells the story from a different point of view, was probably composed in the period 350–300 BC, and uses Samuel and Kings as its source.

Biblical evidence indicates that David's Judah was something less than a full-fledged monarchy: it often calls him nagid (lit. 'prince, chief'; Hebrew: נָגִיד, romanized: nāgīḏ) rather than melekh (Hebrew: מֶלֶךְ, lit. 'king'); David sets up none of the complex bureaucracy that a kingdom needs. His army is made up of volunteers and his followers are largely relations or from his home region of Hebron.

Beyond this, the full range of possible interpretations is available. A number of scholars consider the David story to be a heroic tale similar to the legend of King Arthur or the epics of Homer, while others find such comparisons questionable.

The instance in the Book of Jashar, excerpted in 2 Samuel 1:26, where David "proclaims that Jonathan's love was sweeter to him than the love of a woman", has been compared to Achilles' comparison of Patroclus to a girl and Gilgamesh's love for Enkidu "as a woman". Others hold that the David story is a political apology—an answer to contemporary charges against him, of his involvement in murders and regicide. The authors and editors of Samuel and Chronicles aimed not to record history but to promote David's reign as inevitable and desirable, and for this reason there is little about David that is concrete and undisputed. Other scholars argue that, notwithstanding the apologetic tenor of the story, the authors of Samuel were also critical of David in several respects, suggesting that the text presents a complex portrait of him rather than a purely propagandistic one.

Some other studies of David have been written: Baruch Halpern has pictured him as a brutal tyrant, a murderer, and a lifelong vassal of Achish, the Philistine king of Gath; Steven McKenzie argues that David came from a wealthy family of landowners, through his father Jesse, and that he was an "ambitious and ruthless" ruler who murdered his opponents, including his two eldest sons. Joel S. Baden has called him "an ambitious, ruthless, flesh-and-blood man who achieved power by any means necessary, including murder, theft, bribery, sex, deceit, and treason". William G. Dever described him as "a serial killer".

Jacob L. Wright has written that the most popular legends about David, including his killing of Goliath, his affair with Bathsheba, and his ruling of the unified Kingdom of Israel rather than just Judah, are the creation of those who lived generations after him, in particular those living in the late Persian or Hellenistic periods.

=== Archaeological findings ===
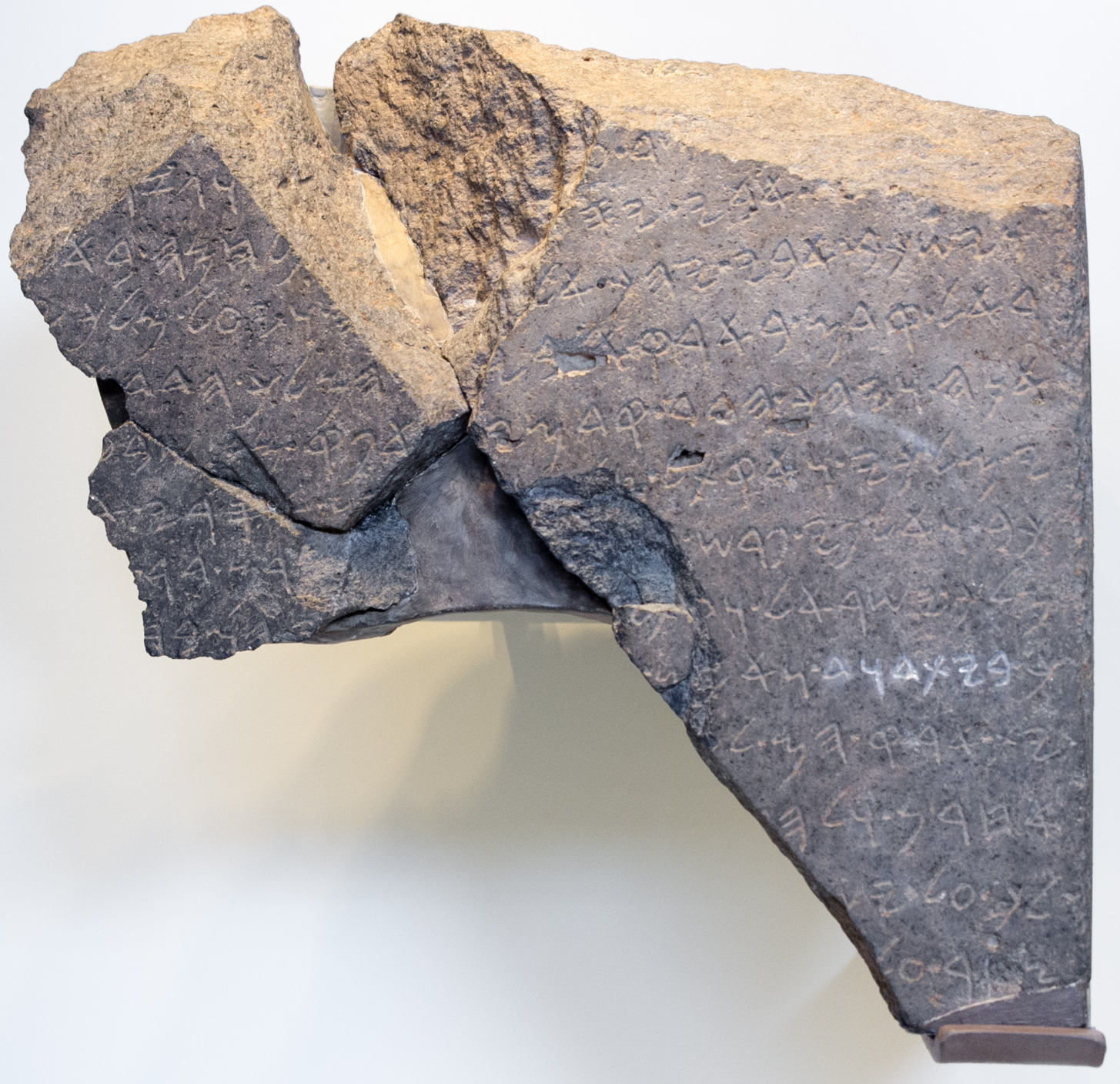
The Tel Dan stele

The Tel Dan stele, discovered in 1993, is an inscribed stone erected by Hazael, a king of Damascus in the late 9th/early 8th centuries BC. It commemorates the king's victory over two enemy kings, and contains the phrase 𐤁𐤉𐤕𐤃𐤅𐤃, bytdwd, which most scholars translate as "House of David". Other scholars have challenged this reading, but this is likely a reference to a dynasty of the Kingdom of Judah which traced its ancestry to a founder named David. David's historicity is supported by the inscription, as an extrabiblical source indicating that outsiders viewed someone named David as the founder of a Judahite monarchy, and his similar portrayal in multiple books in the bible.

Two epigraphers, André Lemaire and Émile Puech, hypothesised in 1994 that the Mesha Stele from Moab, dating from the 9th century, also contain the words "House of David" at the end of Line 31, although this was considered as less certain than the mention in the Tel Dan inscription. In May 2019, Israel Finkelstein, Nadav Na'aman, and Thomas Römer concluded from the new images that the ruler's name contained three consonants and started with a bet, which excludes the reading "House of David" and, in conjunction with the monarch's city of residence "Horonaim" in Moab, makes it likely that the one mentioned is King Balak, a name also known from the Hebrew Bible. Later that year, Michael Langlois used high-resolution photographs of both the inscription itself, and the 19th-century original squeeze of the then still intact stele to reaffirm Lemaire's view that line 31 contains the phrase "House of David". Replying to Langlois, Na'aman argued that the "House of David" reading is unacceptable because the resulting sentence structure is extremely rare in West Semitic royal inscriptions.

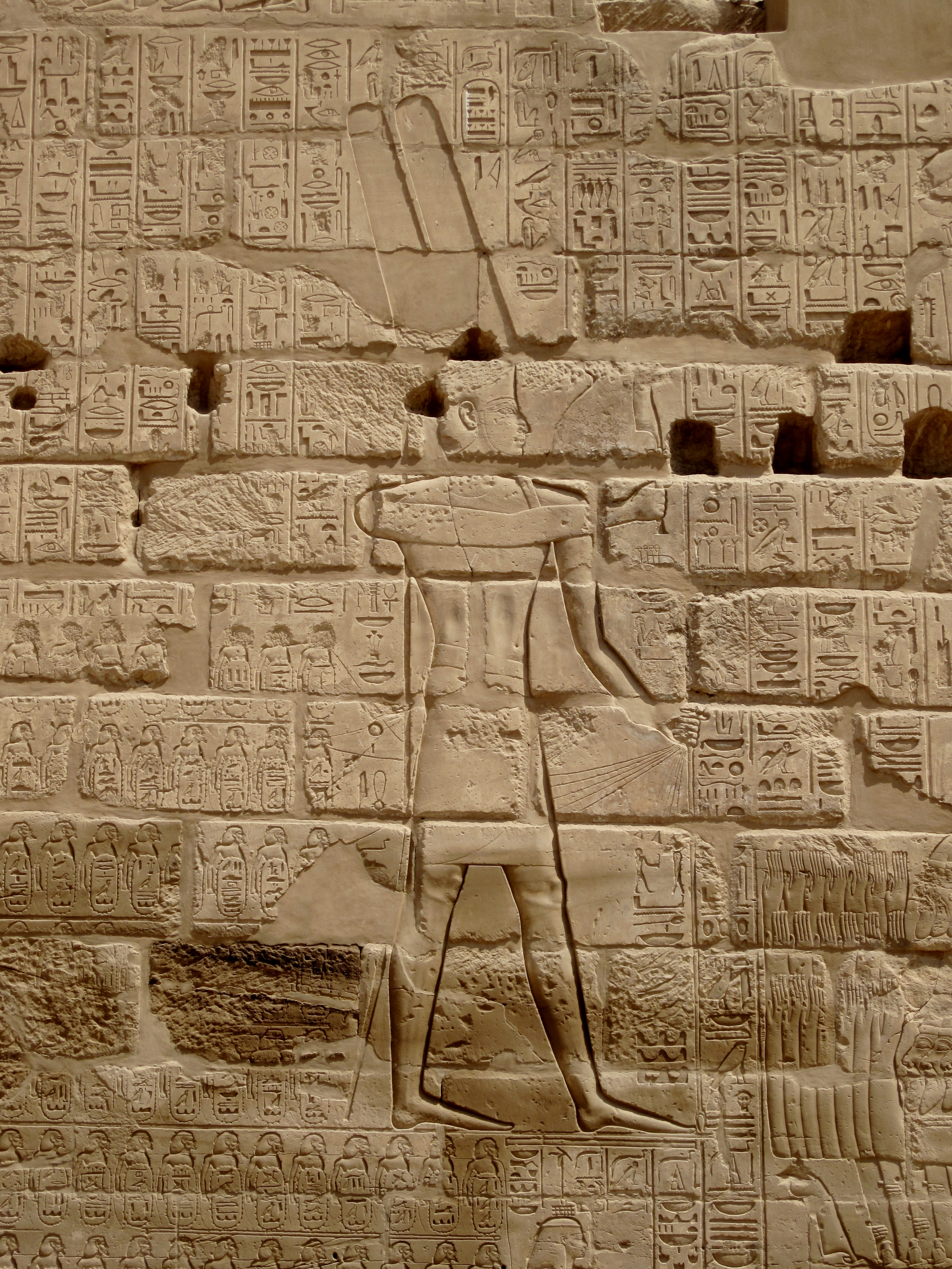
The Triumphal Relief of Shoshenq I near the Bubastite Portal at Karnak, depicting the god Amun-Re receiving a list of cities and villages conquered by the king in his Near Eastern military campaigns.

Besides the two steles, Bible scholar and Egyptologist Kenneth Kitchen suggests that David's name also appears in a relief of the pharaoh Shoshenq I, who is usually identified with Shishak in the Bible. The relief claims that Shoshenq raided places in Palestine in 925 BC, and Kitchen interprets one place as "Heights of David", which was in southern Judah and the Negev where the Bible says David took refuge from Saul. The proposed identification of David’s name on the Shoshenq relief is highly uncertain because the relevant text is damaged, its geographic ordering is disputed, and the Egyptian term interpreted as “highland/heights of David” has an unclear meaning.

=== Archaeological analysis ===
According to Richard Nelson, David was certainly a historical figure but was more like a chief than a king. Most scholars think his role as a founder of Judah is verified by the Tel Dan stele.

Of the evidence in question, John Haralson Hayes and James Maxwell Miller wrote in 2006: "If one is not convinced in advance by the biblical profile, then there is nothing in the archaeological evidence itself to suggest that much of consequence was going on in Palestine during the tenth century BC, and certainly nothing to suggest that Jerusalem was a great political and cultural center." This echoed the 1995 conclusion of Amélie Kuhrt, who noted that "there are no royal inscriptions from the time of the united monarchy (indeed very little written material altogether), and not a single contemporary reference to either David or Solomon," while noting, "against this must be set the evidence for substantial development and growth at several sites, which is plausibly related to the tenth century."

In 2007, Israel Finkelstein and Neil Asher Silberman stated that the archaeological evidence shows that Judah was sparsely inhabited and Jerusalem was no larger than a small village. The evidence suggested that David ruled only as a chieftain over an area which cannot be described as a state or as a kingdom, but more as a chiefdom, much smaller and always overshadowed by the older and more powerful kingdom of Israel to the north. They posited that Israel and Judah were not monotheistic at the time and that later 7th-century redactors sought to portray a past golden age of a united, monotheistic monarchy to serve contemporary needs. They noted a lack of archaeological evidence for David's military campaigns and a relative underdevelopment of Jerusalem, the capital of Judah, compared to a more developed and urbanized Samaria, capital of Israel during the 9th century BC.

In 2010, Amihai Mazar wrote that the United Monarchy of the 10th century BC can be described as a "state in development". He compared David to Labaya, a Caananite warlord living during the time of Pharaoh Akhenaten. While Mazar believes that David reigned over Israel during the 11th century BC, he argues that much of the Biblical text is of "literary-legendary nature". According to William G. Dever, the reigns of Saul, David and Solomon are reasonably well attested, but "most archeologists today would argue that the United Monarchy was not much more than a kind of hill-country chiefdom". Avraham Faust and Zev Farber argue that David managed to establish a mini-empire through multiple conquests which are archaeologically attested in destruction layers of many urban centres dating to his time.

Lester L. Grabbe wrote in 2017: "The main question is what kind of settlement Jerusalem was in Iron IIA: was it a minor settlement, perhaps a large village or possibly a citadel but not a city, or was it the capital of a flourishing—or at least an emerging—state? Assessments differ considerably". Isaac Kalimi wrote in 2018, "No contemporaneous extra-biblical source offers any account of the political situation in Israel and Judah during the tenth century BC, and as we have seen, the archaeological remains themselves cannot provide any unambiguous evidence of events."

The view of Davidic Jerusalem as a village has been challenged by Eilat Mazar's excavation of the Large Stone Structure and the Stepped Stone Structure in 2005. Mazar proposed that these two structures may have been architecturally linked as one unit and that they date to the time of King David. Mazar supports this dating with a number of artefacts, including pottery, two Phoenician-style ivory inlays, a black-and-red jug, and a radiocarbon-dated bone, estimated to be from the 10th century. Dever, Amihai Mazar, Avraham Faust, and Nadav Na'aman have argued in favour of the 10th-century BC dating and responded to challenges to it. In 2010, Eilat Mazar announced the discovery of part of the ancient city walls around the City of David, which she believes date to the 10th century BC. According to Mazar, this would prove that an organized state did exist in the 10th century. In 2006, Kenneth Kitchen came to a similar conclusion, arguing that "the physical archaeology of tenth-century Canaan is consistent with the former existence of a unified state on its terrain."

Scholars such as Israel Finkelstein, Lily Singer-Avitz, Ze'ev Herzog and David Ussishkin do not accept these conclusions. Finkelstein does not accept the dating of these structures to the 10th century BC, based in part on the fact that later structures on the site penetrated deep into underlying layers, that the entire area had been excavated in the early 20th century and then backfilled, that pottery from later periods was found below earlier strata, and that consequently the finds collected by E. Mazar cannot necessarily be considered as retrieved in situ. Aren Maeir said in 2010 that he has seen no evidence that these structures are from the 10th century BC and that proof of the existence of a strong, centralized kingdom at that time remains "tenuous."

Excavations at Khirbet Qeiyafa by archaeologists Yosef Garfinkel and Saar Ganor found an urbanized settlement radiocarbon dated to the 10th century, which supports the existence of an urbanized kingdom. The Israel Antiquities Authority stated: "The excavations at Khirbat Qeiyafa clearly reveal an urban society that existed in Judah already in the late eleventh century BC. It can no longer be argued that the Kingdom of Judah developed only in the late eighth century BC or at some other later date." But other scholars have criticized the techniques and interpretations to reach some conclusions related to Khirbet Qeiyafa, such as Israel Finkelstein and Alexander Fantalkin of Tel Aviv University, who have instead proposed that the city is to be identified as part of a northern Israelite polity.

In 2018, Avraham Faust and Yair Sapir stated that a Canaanite site at Tel Eton, about 30 miles from Jerusalem, was taken over by a Judahite community by peaceful assimilation and transformed from a village into a central town at some point in the late 11th or early 10th century BC. This transformation used some ashlar blocks in construction, which they argued supports the United Monarchy theory.

== Art and culture ==
=== Literature ===
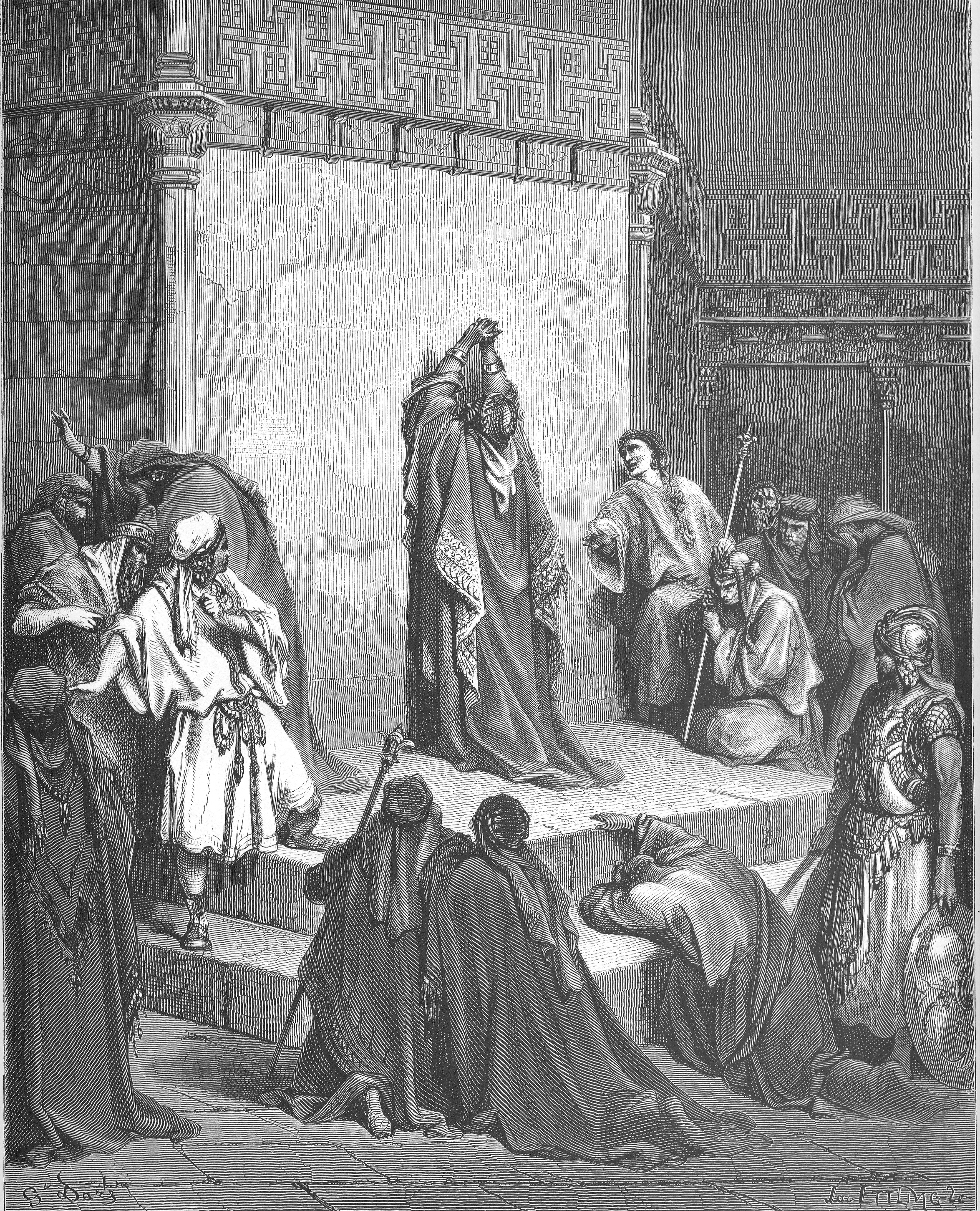
David mourning the death of Absalom, by Gustave Doré

Literary works about David include:

- 1517 The Davidiad is a Neo-Latin epic poem by the Croatian national poet, Catholic priest, and Renaissance humanist Marko Marulić (whose name is sometimes Latinized as "Marcus Marulus"). In addition to the small portions that attempt to recall the epics of Homer, The Davidiad is heavily modelled upon Virgil's Aeneid. This is so much the case that Marulić's contemporaries called him the "Christian Virgil from Split." The philologist Miroslav Marcovich also detects "the influence of Ovid, Lucan, and Statius" in the work.
- 1681–82 Dryden's long poem Absalom and Achitophel is an allegory that uses the story of the rebellion of Absalom against King David as the basis for his satire of the contemporary political situation, including events such as the Monmouth Rebellion (1685), the Popish Plot (1678) and the Exclusion Crisis.
- 1893 Sir Arthur Conan Doyle may have used the story of David and Bathsheba as a foundation for the Sherlock Holmes story The Adventure of the Crooked Man. Holmes mentions "the small affair of Uriah and Bathsheba" at the end of the story.
- 1928 Elmer Davis's novel Giant Killer retells and embellishes the biblical story of David, casting David as primarily a poet who managed always to find others to do the "dirty work" of heroism and kingship. In the novel, Elhanan in fact killed Goliath but David claimed the credit; and Joab, David's cousin and general, took it upon himself to make many of the difficult decisions of war and statecraft when David vacillated or wrote poetry instead.
- 1936 William Faulkner's Absalom, Absalom! refers to the story of Absalom, David's son; his rebellion against his father and his death at the hands of David's general, Joab. In addition it parallels Absalom's vengeance for the rape of his sister Tamar by his half-brother, Amnon.
- 1946 Gladys Schmitt's novel David the King was a richly embellished biography of David's entire life. The book took a risk, especially for its time, in portraying David's relationship with Jonathan as overtly homoerotic, but was ultimately panned by critics as a bland rendition of the title character.
- 1966 Juan Bosch, a Dominican political leader and writer, wrote David: Biography of a King, as a realistic portrayal of David's life and political career.
- 1970 Dan Jacobson's The Rape of Tamar is an imagined account, by one of David's courtiers Yonadab, of the rape of Tamar by Amnon.
- 1972 Stefan Heym wrote The King David Report in which the historian Ethan compiles upon King Solomon's orders "a true and authoritative report on the life of David, Son of Jesse"—the East German writer's wry depiction of a court historian writing an "authorized" history, many incidents clearly intended as satirical references to the writer's own time.
- 1974 In Thomas Burnett Swann's biblical fantasy novel How are the Mighty Fallen, David and Jonathan are explicitly stated to be lovers. Moreover, Jonathan is a member of a winged semi-human race (possibly nephilim), one of several such races coexisting with humanity but often persecuted by it.
- 1980 Malachi Martin's factional novel King of Kings: A Novel of the Life of David relates the life of David, Adonai's champion in his battle with the Philistine deity Dagon.
- 1984 Joseph Heller wrote a novel based on David called God Knows, published by Simon & Schuster. Told from the perspective of an ageing David, the humanity—rather than the heroism—of various biblical characters is emphasized. The portrayal of David as a man of flaws such as greed, lust, selfishness, and his alienation from God, the falling apart of his family is a distinctly 20th-century interpretation of the events told in the Bible.
- 1993 Madeleine L'Engle's novel Certain Women explores family, the Christian faith, and the nature of God through the story of King David's family and an analogous modern family's saga.
- 1995 Allan Massie wrote King David, a novel about David's career that portrays the king's relationship to Jonathan as sexual.
- 2015 Geraldine Brooks wrote a novel about David, The Secret Chord, told from the point of view of the prophet Nathan.
- 2020 Michael Arditti wrote The Anointed, a novel about David told by three of his wives, Michal, Abigail and Bathsheba.

=== Paintings ===
- 1599 Caravaggio David and Goliath
- c. 1610 Caravaggio David with the Head of Goliath
- 1616 Peter Paul Rubens David Slaying Goliath

=== Sculptures ===
David in sculpture

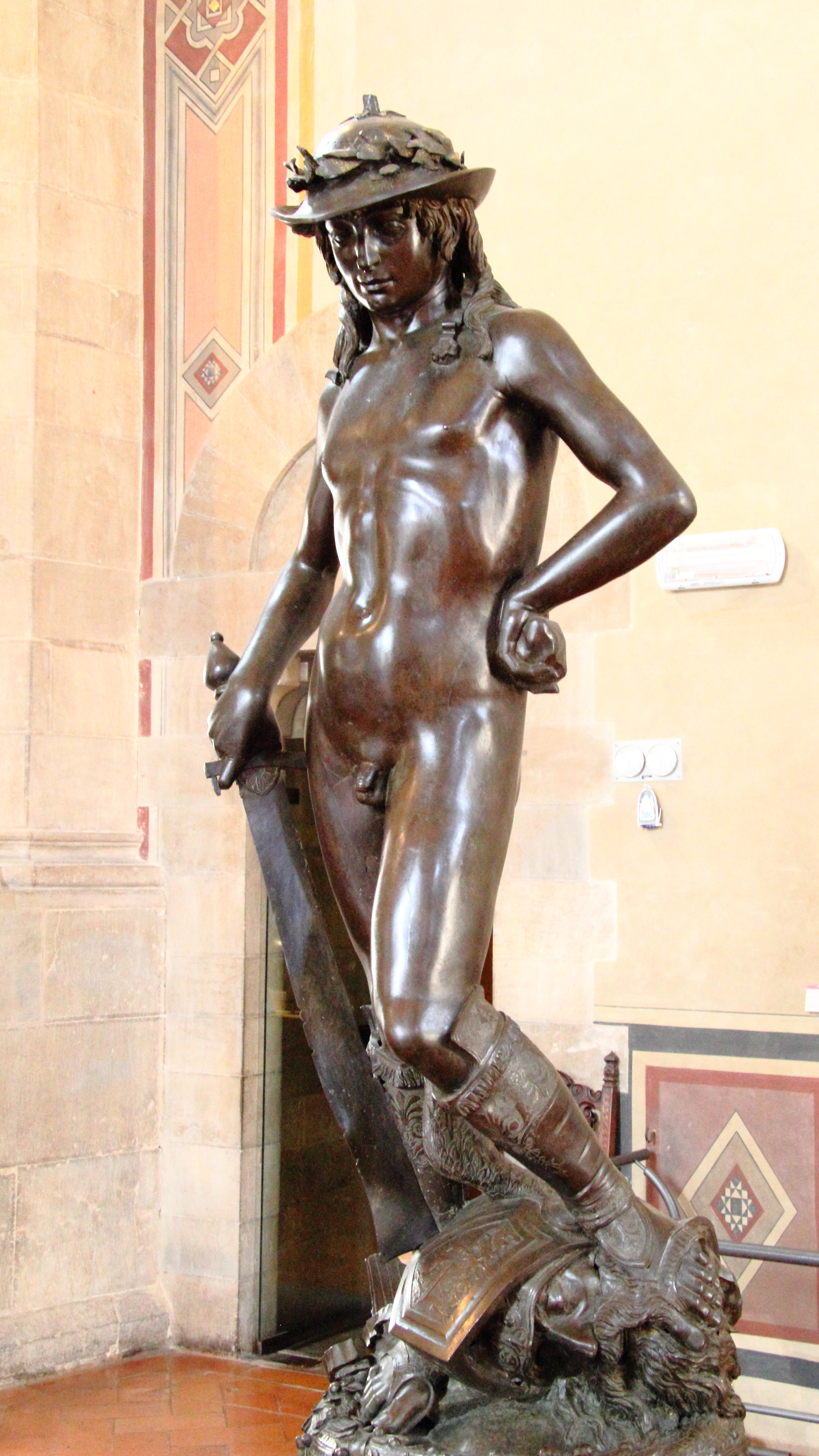
David by Donatello

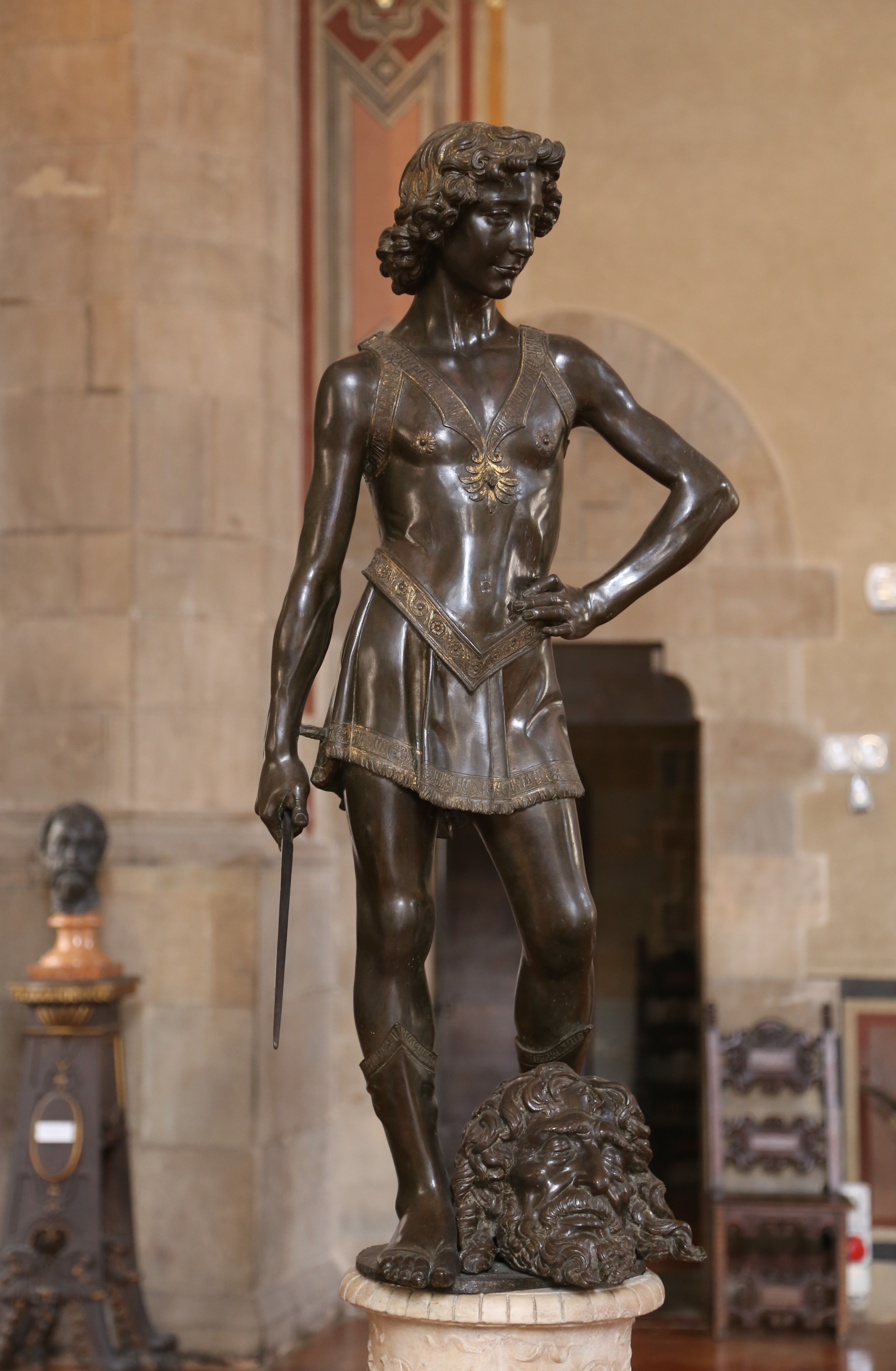
David by Verrocchio

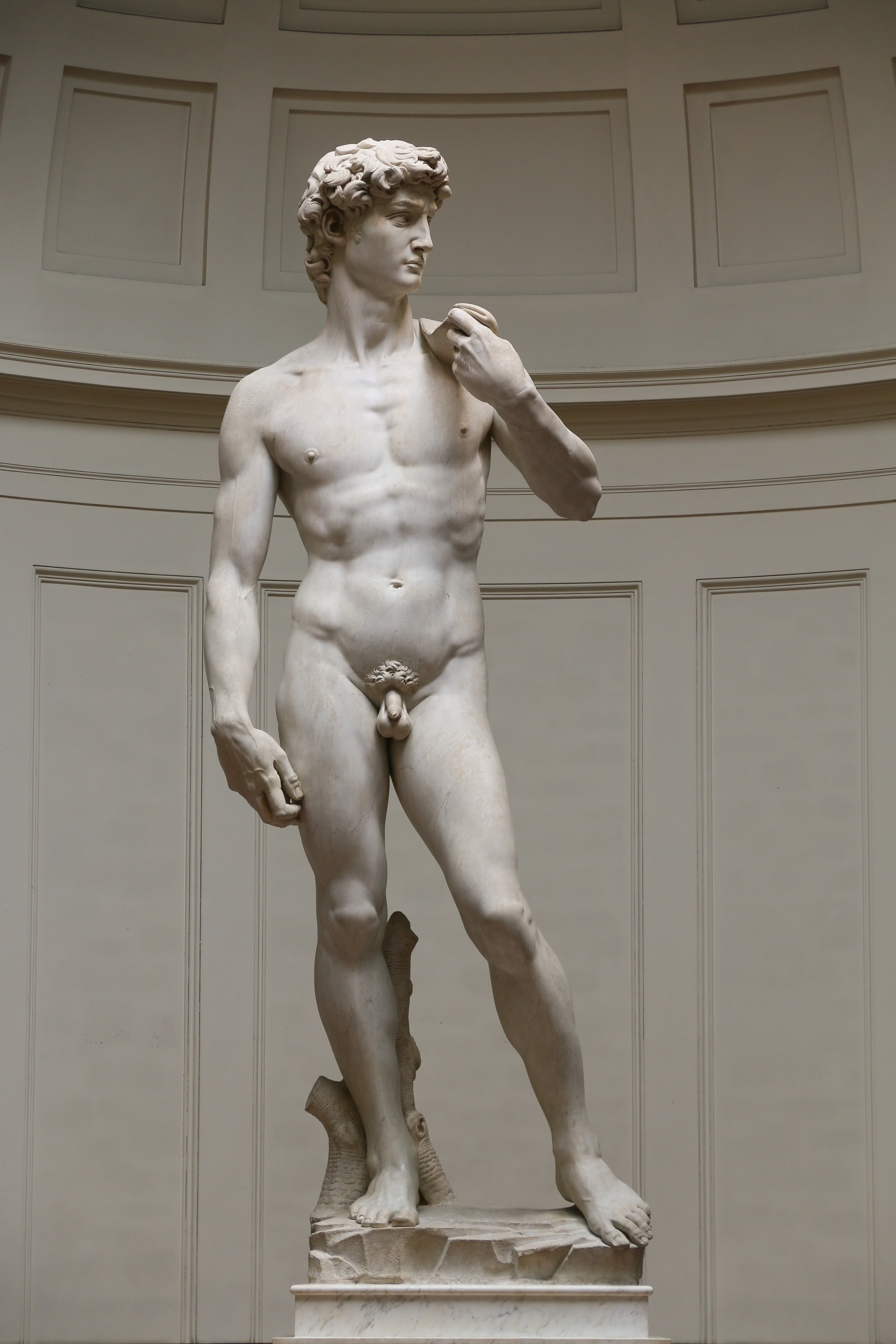
David by Michelangelo

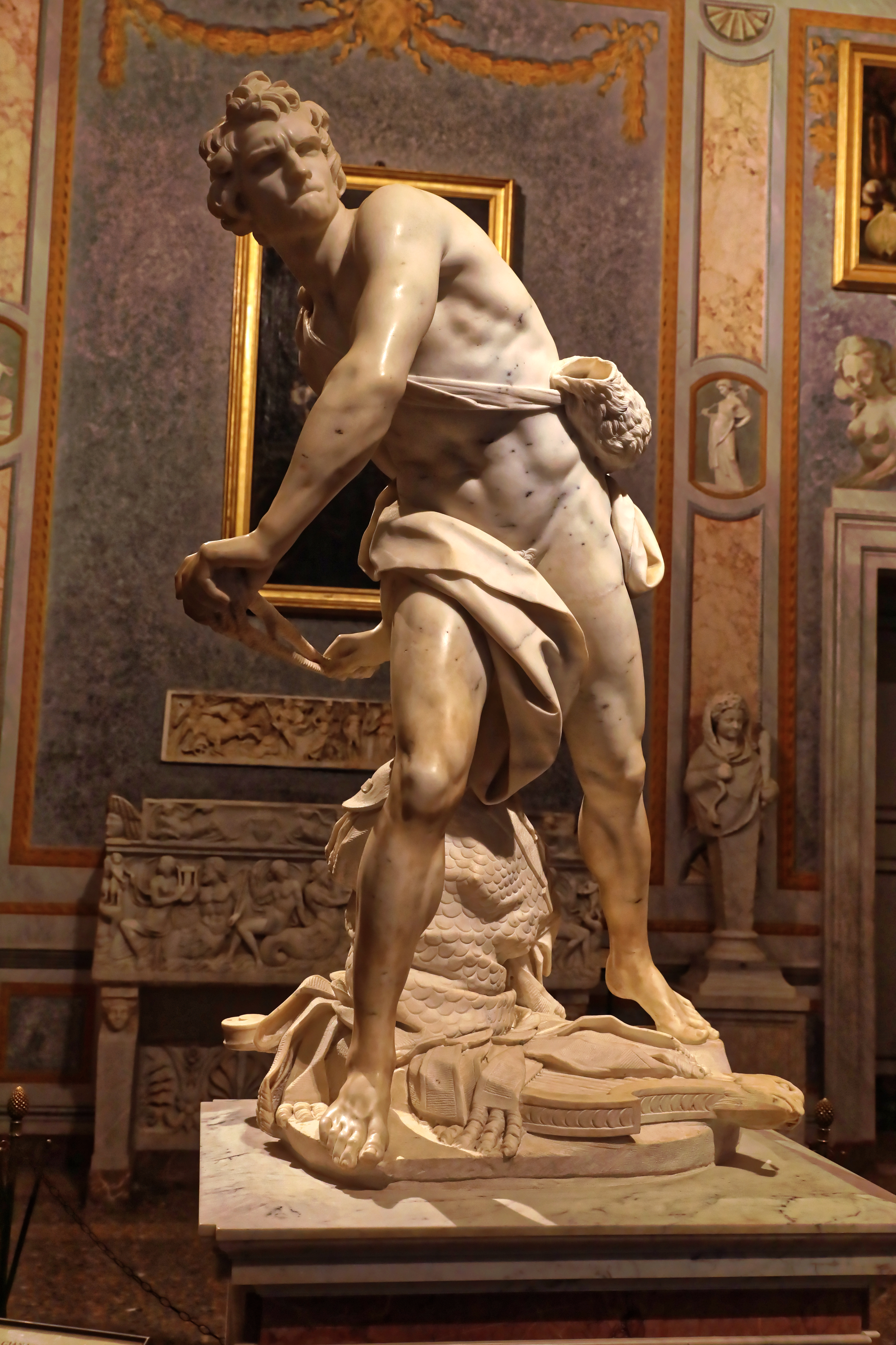
David by Gian Lorenzo Bernini

- 1440? Donatello, David
- 1473–1475 Verrocchio, David
- 1501–1504 Michelangelo, David
- 1623–1624 Gian Lorenzo Bernini, David

=== Film ===
David has been depicted several times in films; these include:

- 1951 David and Bathsheba, directed by Henry King, with Gregory Peck in the role of David.
- 1959 Solomon and Sheba, directed by King Vidor, with Finlay Currie in the role of an aged King David.
- 1985 King David, directed by Bruce Beresford, with Richard Gere in the role of David.
- 1996 Dave and the Giant Pickle
- 2025 David, an animated film directed by Brent Dawes and Phil Chunningham, with Brandon Engman in the role of young David and Phil Wickham in the role of adult David.

=== Television ===
- 1961 A Story of David, directed by Bob McNaught, with Jeff Chandler in the role of David.
- 1976 The Story of David, a made-for-TV film with Timothy Bottoms and Keith Michell as King David at different ages.
- 1997 David, a TV-film with Nathaniel Parker as King David and Leonard Nimoy as the Prophet Samuel.
- 1997 Solomon, a sequel to David, with Max von Sydow playing an older King David.
- 2009 Kings, a re-imagining loosely based on the biblical story, with David played by Christopher Egan.
- King David is the focus of the second episode of History Channel's Battles BC documentary, which detailed all of his military exploits in the bible.
- 2012 Rei Davi, a Brazilian miniseries with Leonardo Brício as David.
- 2013 The Bible, a miniseries with Langley Kirkwood in the role of David.
- 2016 Of Kings and Prophets in which David is played by Olly Rix.
- 2025 House of David, multi-season series of David's life which Michael Iskander plays the role of David.

=== Music ===
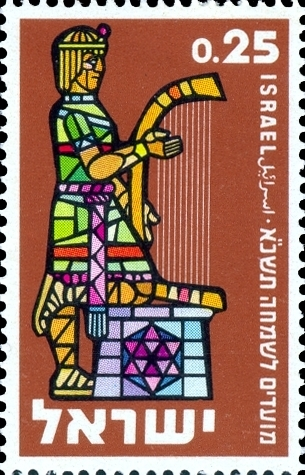
David on an Israeli stamp

- The traditional birthday song Las Mañanitas mentions King David as the original singer in its lyrics.
- 1622 Thomas Tomkins's choral anthem "When David Heard", about David's response to the death of his son Absalom, is published in the anthology Songs of 1622.
- 1738 George Frideric Handel's oratorio Saul features David as one of its main characters.
- 1921 Arthur Honegger's oratorio Le Roi David with a libretto by René Morax, instantly became a staple of the choral repertoire.
- 1954 Darius Milhaud's opera David premieres in Jerusalem in celebration of the 3,000th anniversary of the establishment of that city by David.
- 1964 Bob Dylan alludes to David in the last line of his song "When The Ship Comes In" ("And like Goliath, they'll be conquered").
- 1965 Leonard Bernstein described the second movement of his Chichester Psalms, which features a setting of Psalm 23, sung by a boy soloist accompanied by a harp, as a "musical evocation of King David, the shepherd-psalmist".
- 1983 Bob Dylan refers to David in his song "Jokerman" ("Michelangelo indeed could've carved out your features").
- 1984 Leonard Cohen's song "Hallelujah" has references to David ("there was a secret chord that David played and it pleased the Lord", "The baffled king composing Hallelujah") and Bathsheba ("you saw her bathing on the roof") in its opening verses.
- 1990 The song "One of the Broken" by Paddy McAloon, performed by Prefab Sprout on the album Jordan: The Comeback, has a reference to David ("I remember King David, with his harp and his beautiful, beautiful songs, I answered his prayers, and showed him a place where his music belongs").
- 1991 "Mad About You", a song on Sting's album The Soul Cages, explores David's obsession with Bathsheba from David's perspective.
- 2000 The song "Gimme a Stone" appears on the Little Feat album Chinese Work Songs chronicles the duel with Goliath and contains a lament to Absalom as a bridge.

=== Musical theatre ===
- 1997 King David, sometimes described as a modern oratorio, with a book and lyrics by Tim Rice and music by Alan Menken.

=== Radio ===
- 1962 Twilight of a Hero, an Australian radio play that sold to the BBC

=== Playing cards ===
For a considerable period, starting in the 15th century and continuing until the 19th, French playing card manufacturers assigned to each of the court cards names taken from history or mythology. In this context, the King of spades was often known as "David".

== Image gallery ==
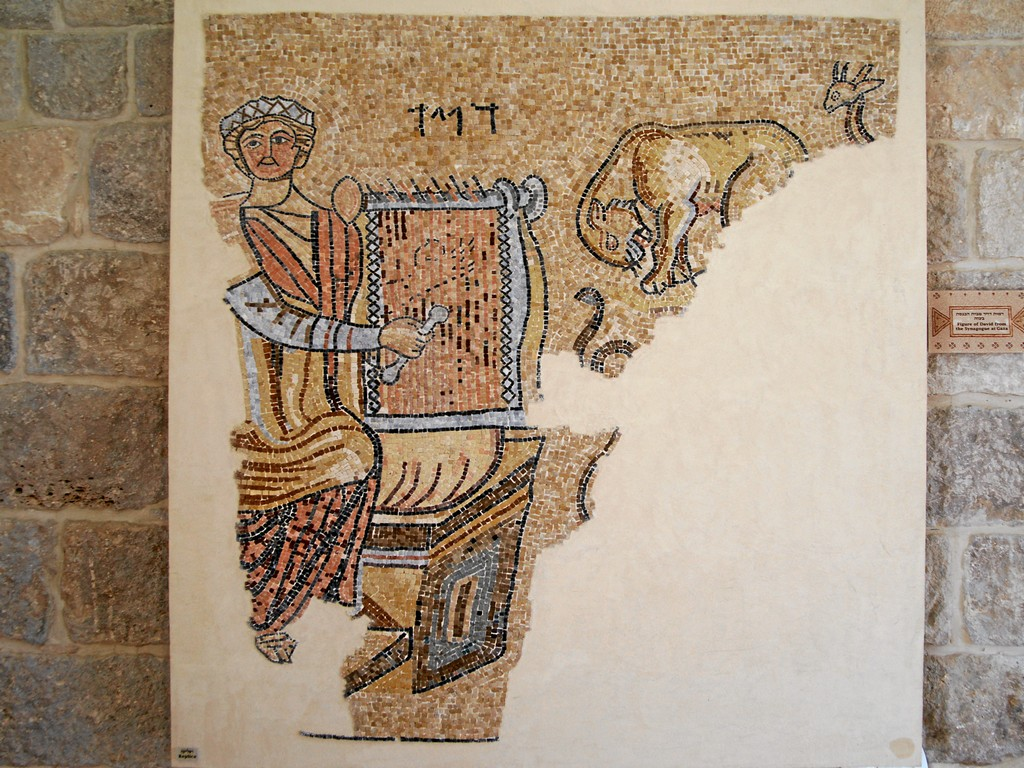
King David as Orpheus, mosaic of Gaza synagogue, AD 508. Museum of the Good Samaritan near Ma'ale Adumim

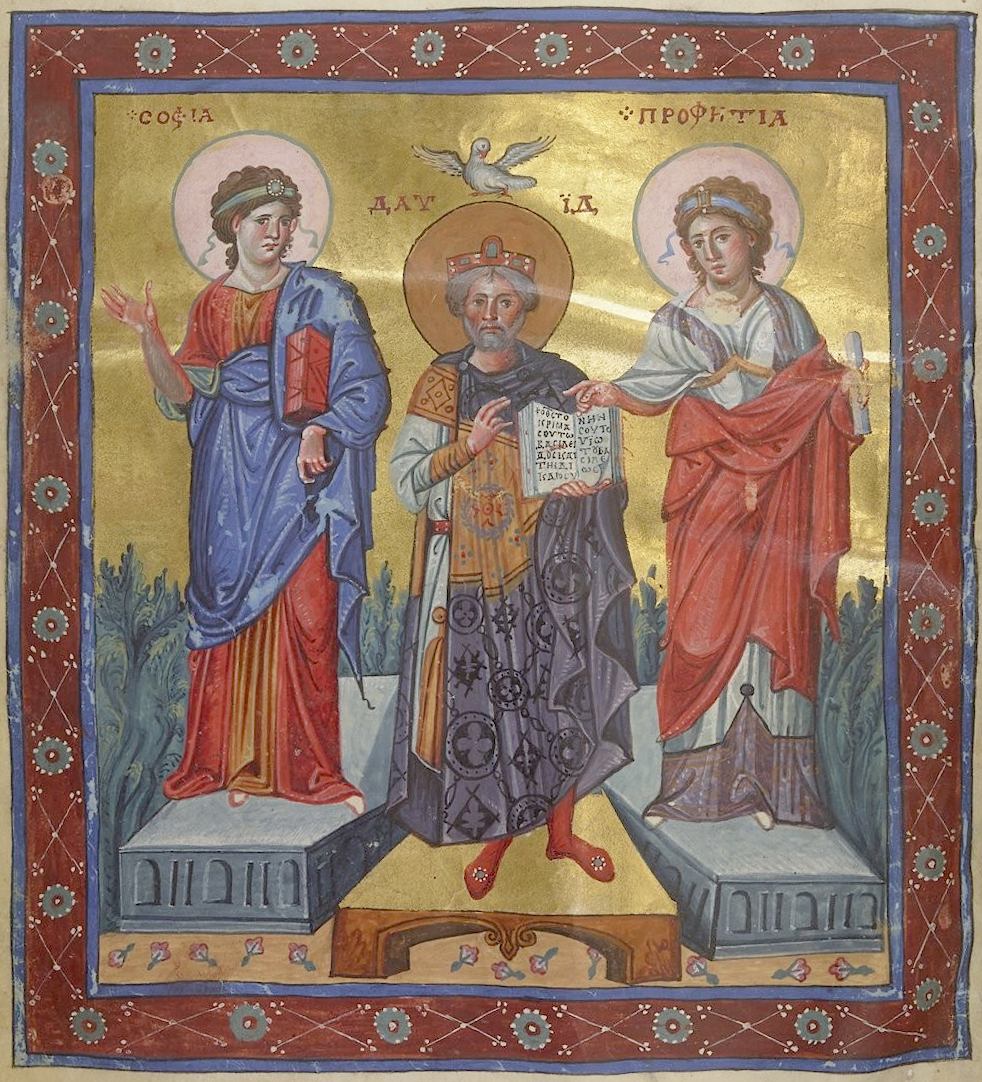
Miniature from the Paris Psalter, David in the robes of a Byzantine emperor.

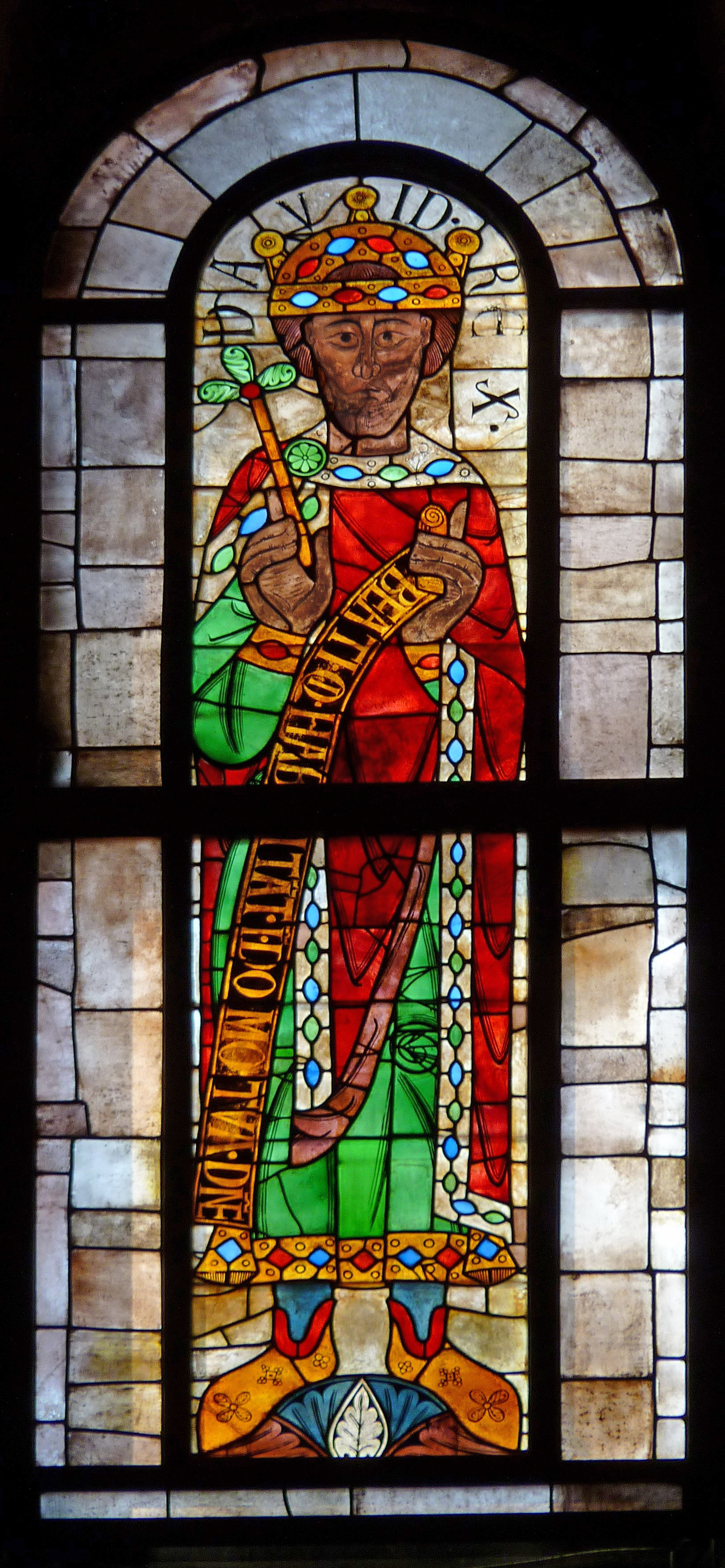
King David, stained glass windows from the Romanesque Augsburg Cathedral, late 11th century.

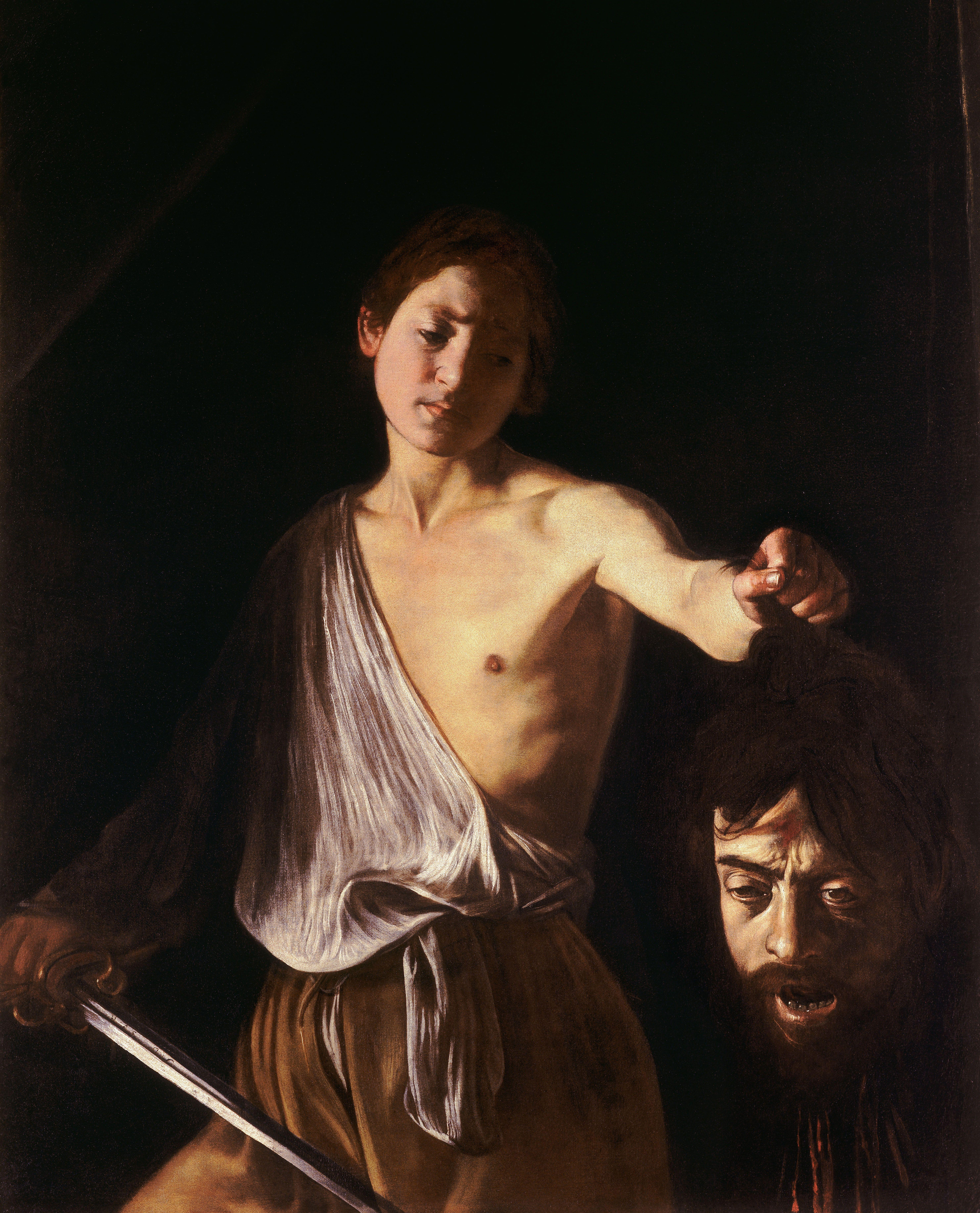
Caravaggio, 1610, David with the Head of Goliath, Galleria Borghese, Rome

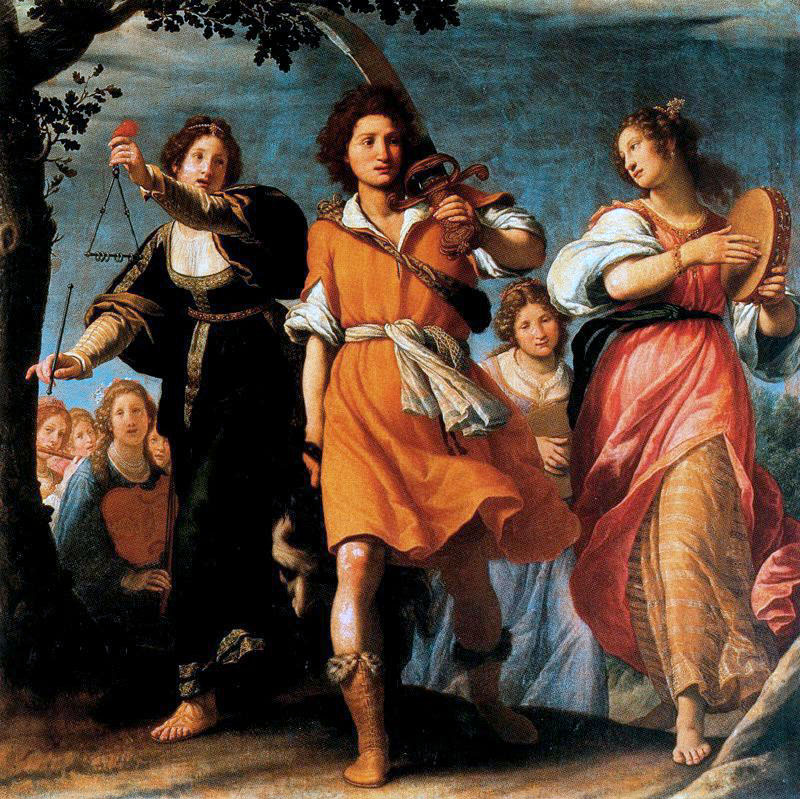
Matteo Rosselli, 1620, The triumphant David, Galleria Palatina, Florence.

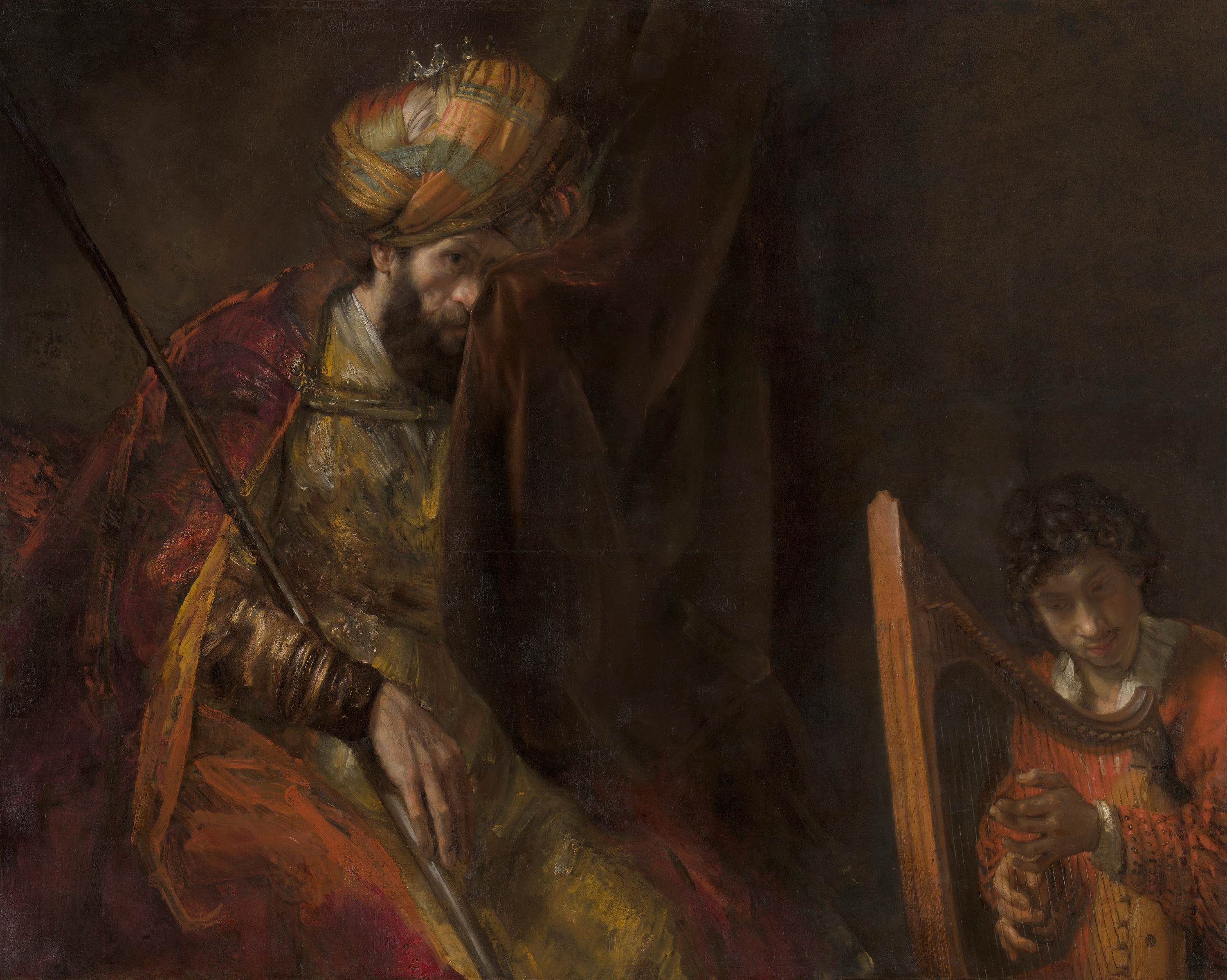
Rembrandt, c. 1650: Saul and David.

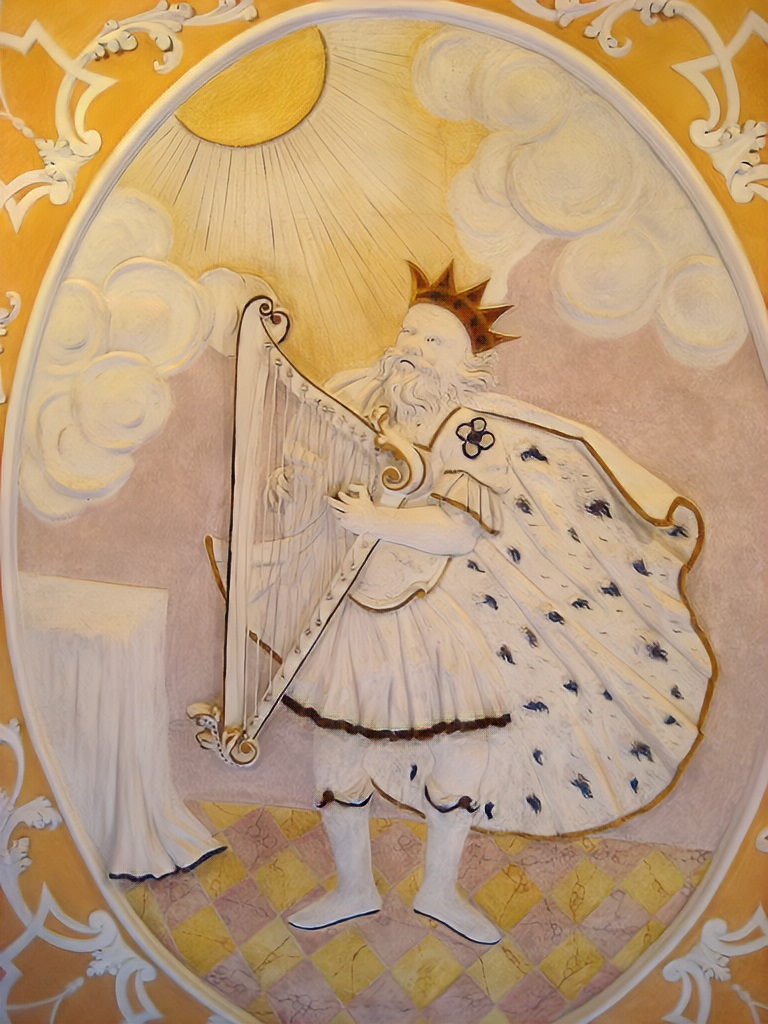
King David playing the harp, ceiling fresco from Monheim Town Hall, home of a wealthy Jewish merchant.

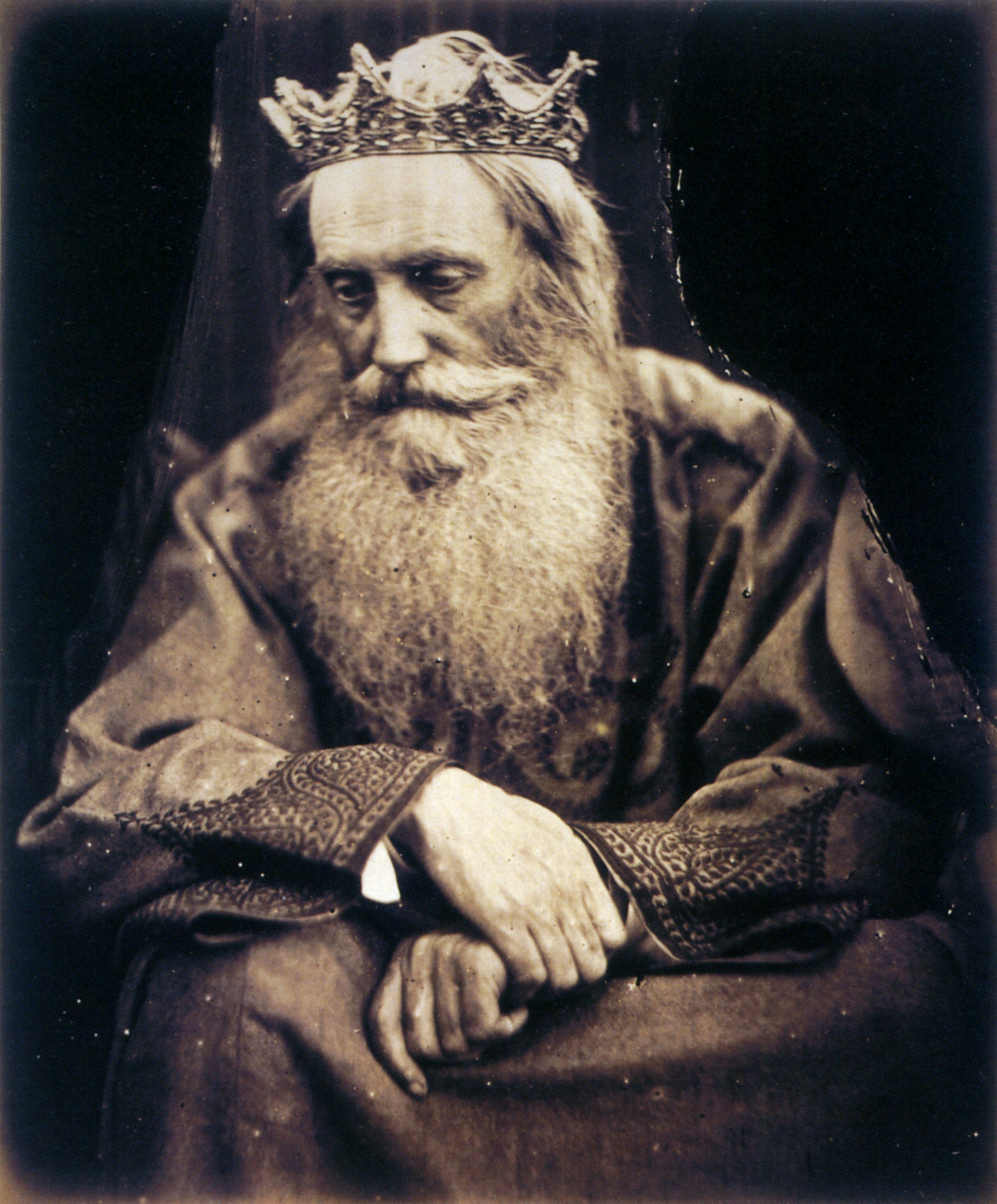
Study of King David, by Julia Margaret Cameron. Depicts Sir Henry Taylor, 1866.

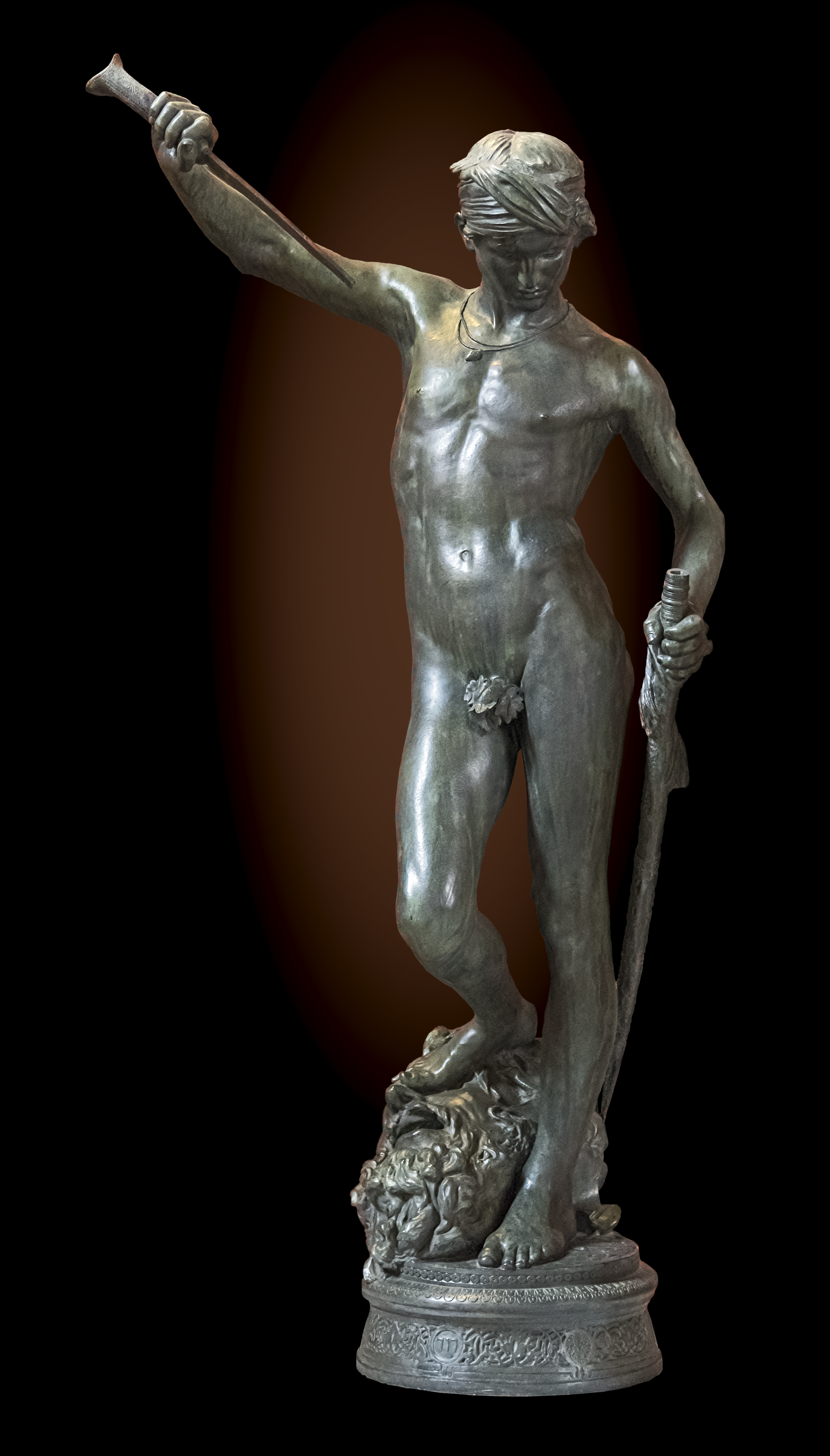
David by Antonin Mercié, 1871, Musée d'Orsay

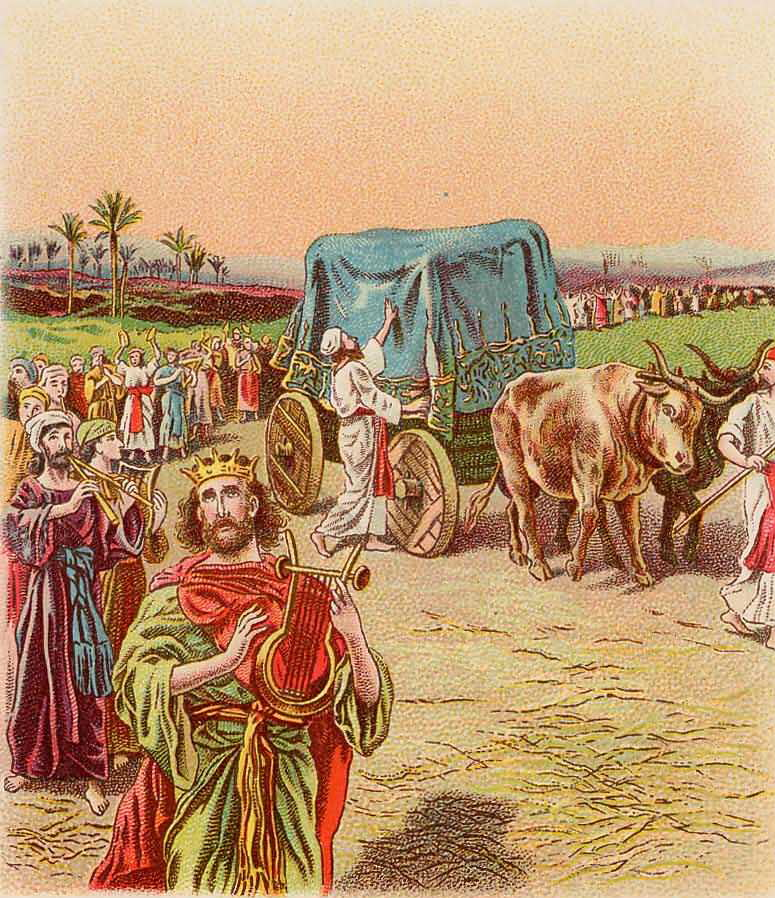
The Ark is brought to Jerusalem (1896 Bible card illustration by the Providence Lithograph Company)

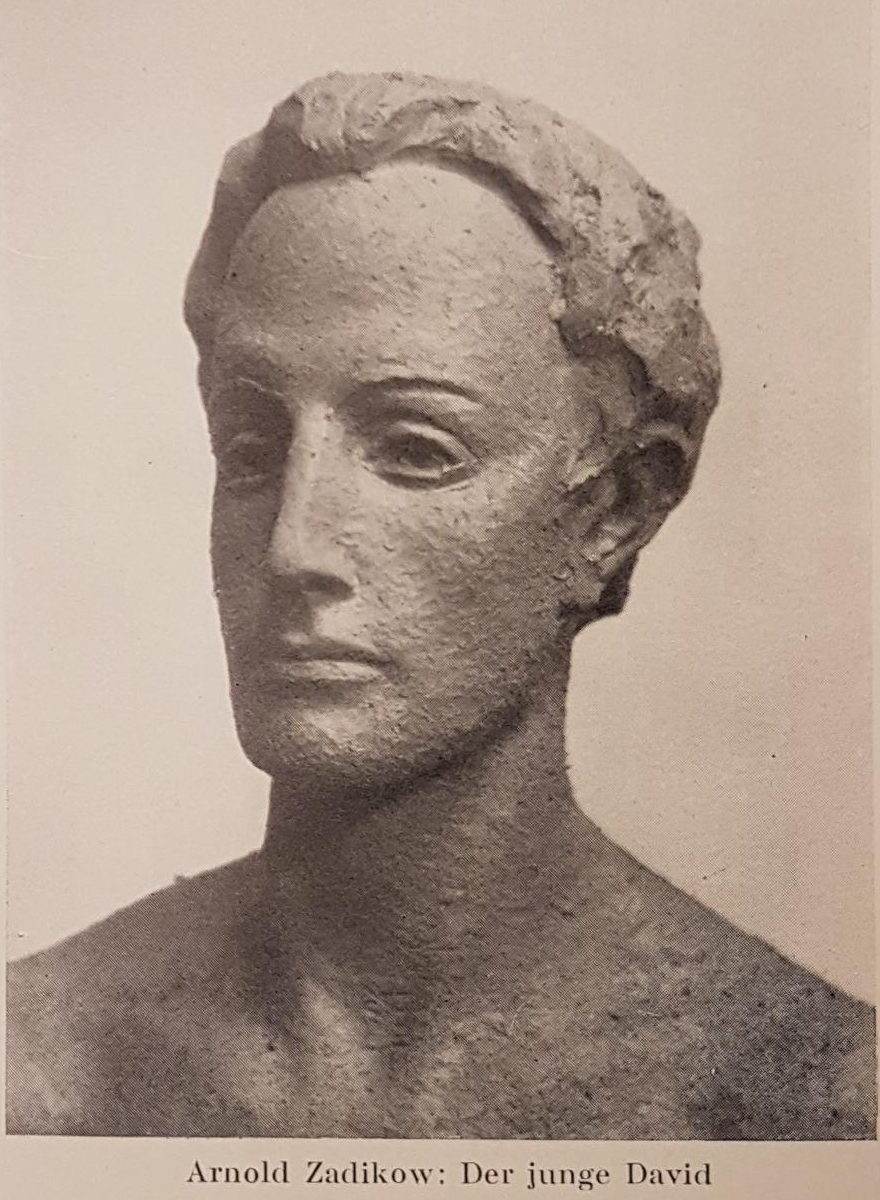
Arnold Zadikow, 1930: The Young David displayed in the entrance of Berlin's Jewish Museum from 1933 until its loss during the Second World War.

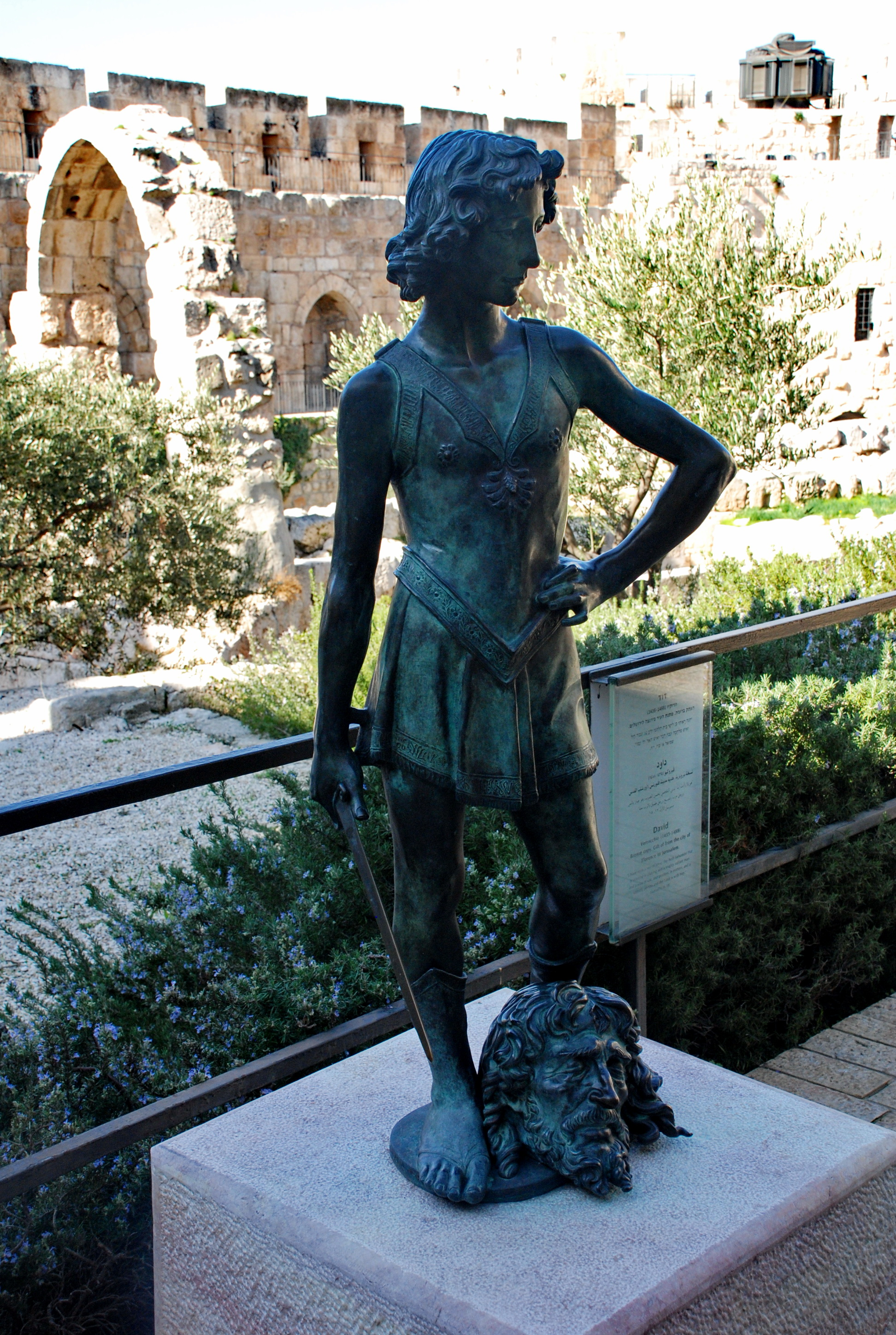
Replica of Verrocchio's David in the Tower of David, Jerusalem

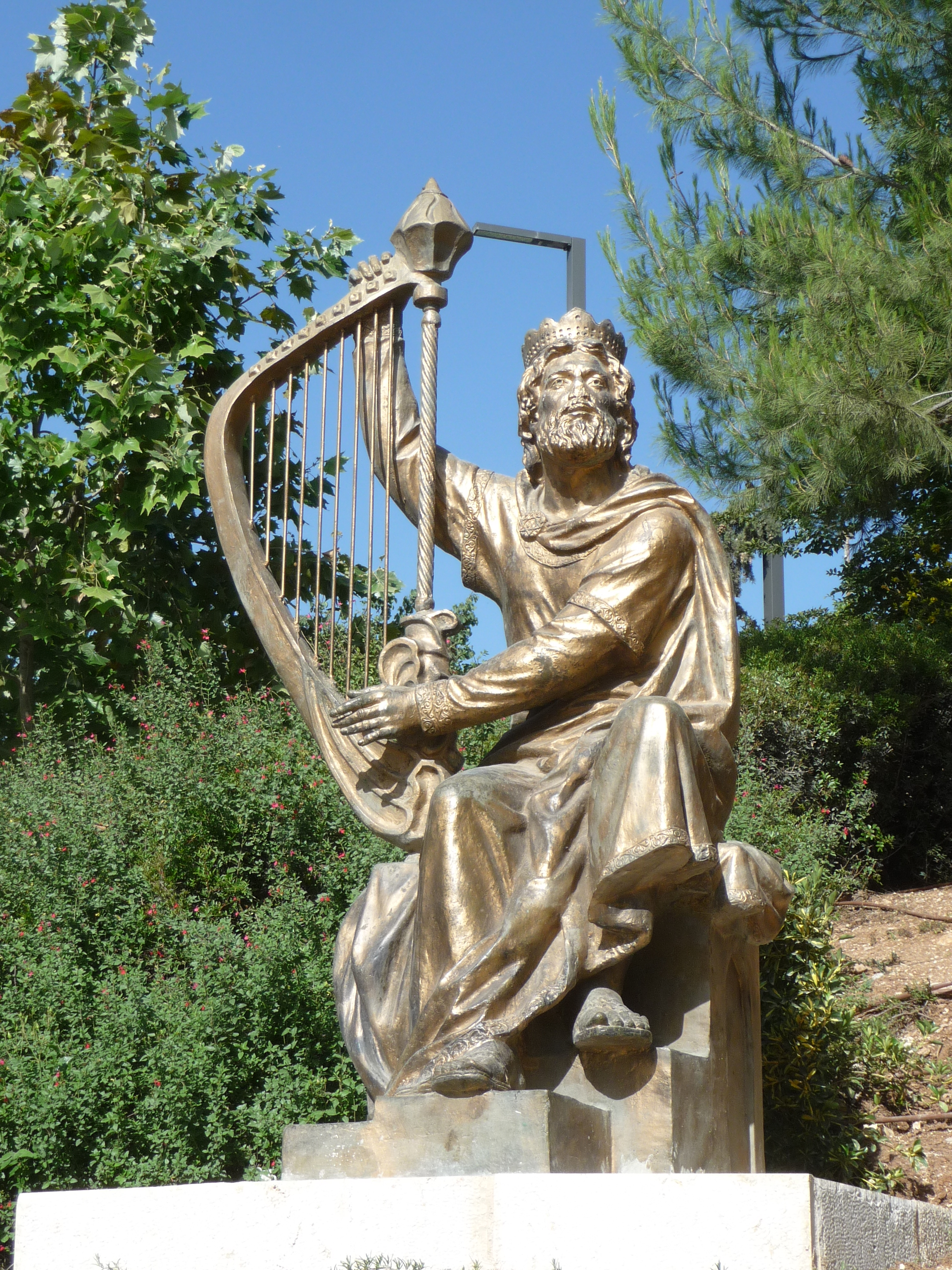
King David Monument on Mount Zion

== See also ==
- David and Jonathan
- David's Mighty Warriors
- David's Tomb
- City of David
- Head of King David
- Tower of David
- Kings of Israel and Judah
- Large Stone Structure
- Midrash Shmuel (aggadah)
- Sons of David
- Star of David

== Notes ==
David of the United Kingdom of Israel and Judah House of David Cadet branch of the Tribe of Judah
Regnal titles
New title Rebellion from Israel under Ish-bosheth	King of Judah	Succeeded by Solomon
Preceded by Ish-bosheth	King of the United; Kingdom of Israel and Judah	Succeeded by Solomon
