= 2 Samuel 17 =

Second Book of Samuel chapter

- ← chapter 16 chapter 18 →
- The pages containing the Books of Samuel (1 & 2 Samuel) Leningrad Codex (1008 CE).
- Book: First book of Samuel
- Hebrew Bible part: Nevi'im
- Order in the Hebrew part: 3
- Category: Former Prophets
- Christian Bible part: Old Testament
- Order in the Christian part: 10

2 Samuel 17 is the seventeenth chapter of the Second Book of Samuel in the Old Testament of the Christian Bible or the second part of Books of Samuel in the Hebrew Bible. According to Jewish tradition the book was attributed to the prophet Samuel, with additions by the prophets Gad and Nathan, but modern scholars view it as a composition of a number of independent texts of various ages from c. 630–540 BCE. This chapter contains the account of David's reign in Jerusalem. This is within a section comprising 2 Samuel 9–20 and continued to 1 Kings 1–2 which deal with the power struggles among David's sons to succeed David's throne until 'the kingdom was established in the hand of Solomon' (1 Kings 2:46).

== Text ==
This chapter was originally written in the Hebrew language. It is divided into 29 verses.

=== Textual witnesses ===
Some early manuscripts containing the text of this chapter in Hebrew are of the Masoretic Text tradition, which includes the Codex Cairensis (895), Aleppo Codex (10th century), and Codex Leningradensis (1008). Fragments containing parts of this chapter in Hebrew were found among the Dead Sea Scrolls including 4Q51 (4QSam^{a}; 100–50 BCE) with extant verses 2–3, 23–25, 29.

Extant ancient manuscripts of a translation into Koine Greek known as the Septuagint (originally was made in the last few centuries BCE) include Codex Vaticanus (B; $\mathfrak{G}$^{B}; 4th century) and Codex Alexandrinus (A; $\mathfrak{G}$^{A}; 5th century). (Note: The whole book of 2 Samuel is missing from the extant Codex Sinaiticus.)

=== Old Testament references ===
- 2 Samuel 17:15–29: Psalm 55:1–23

== Analysis ==
The story of Absalom's rebellion can be observed as five consecutive episodes:

A. David's flight from Jerusalem (15:13–16:14)

B. The victorious Absalom and his counselors (16:15–17:14)

C. David reaches Mahanaim (17:15–29)

B'. The rebellion is crushed and Absalom is executed (18:1–19:8abc)

A'. David's reentry into Jerusalem (19:8d–20:3)

God's role seems to be understated in the whole events, but is disclosed by a seemingly insignificant detail: 'the crossing of the Jordan river'. The Hebrew root word' 'br, "to cross" (in various nominal and verbal forms) is used more than 30 times in these chapters (compared to 20 times in the rest of 2 Samuel) to report David's flight from Jerusalem, his crossing of the Jordan river, and his reentry into Jerusalem. In 2 Samuel 17:16, stating that David should cross the Jordan (17:16), the verb 'br is even reinforced by a 'Hebrew infinitive absolute' to mark this critical moment: "king David is about to cross out of the land of Israel." David's future was in doubt until it was stated that God had rendered foolish Ahithophel's good counsel to Absalom (2 Samuel 17:14), thus granting David's prayer (15:31), and saving David from Absalom's further actions. Once Absalom was defeated, David's crossing back over the Jordan echoes the Israelites' first crossing over the Jordan under Joshua's leadership (Joshua 1–4):

1. Both David and Joshua crossed the Jordan and came to Gilgal (Joshua 4:19; 2 Samuel 19:40).
2. Both were assisted by women who hid the good spies to save the mission: Rahab in Joshua 2:1–21 and the woman of Bahurim in 2 Samuel 17:20.
3. Both episodes include the Ark of the Covenant, although David prevented the ark from crossing out of the land of Israel (15:25; referring to areas west of Jordan river).

Here God's role is not as explicit as during Joshua's crossing, but the signs are clear that God was with David, just as with Joshua.

== Hushai countered Ahitophel's advice (17:1–14) ==
The previous section (2 Samuel 16:15–23) and this passage, comprising 2 Samuel 17:1–14, about Absalom and his two advisors (Ahitophel and Hushai) together have the following structure:

A Absalom and Hushai (16:15–19)

B. Absalom and Ahitophel: first counsel (16:20–22)

An interruption regarding Ahitophel (16:23)

B'. Absalom and Ahitophel: second counsel (17:1–4)

A'. Absalom and Hushai (17:5–14a)

Another interruption regarding Ahitophel (17:14b)

This section records the contest between Hushai and Ahitophel to provide acceptable advice for Absalom, which was pivotal in the story of Absalom's rebellion.

This was prepared by the task given by David to Hushai, that Hushai was to 'defeat... the counsel of Ahithophel' (15:34) and the conversations involving Hushai and the two priests, Zadok and Abiathar (15:24–29, 32–37), in contrast to the respectful introductions to Ahitophel and his counsel (15:12; 16:20–23).

Ahithophel advised Absalom to take action against David quickly: a sudden night attack on David's weary companions, with swift action and minimal loss of life to kill David alone and return all other fugitives to Jerusalem, as 'a young wife returns to her husband after a brief quarrel' (reading verse 30 in the Septuagint, rather than the Masoretic Text). For an unspecified reason Absalom wished to consult Hushai, who then made full use of his persuasive powers in colorful words (verses 8–13) to counter Ahitophel's advice and buy time for David to regroup, using 3 arguments:

1. by reminding Absalom of David's military prowess and David's brave experienced soldiers that would make a night attack against them futile.
2. by suggesting that Absalom muster 'all Israel... from Dan to Beersheba' to battle, a grandeur illusion of a pan-Israelite army supporting Absalom which would totally annihilate the enemy.
3. by suggestion that Absalom himself go to battle in person (instead of sending out Ahitophel with an army), directly appealing to Absalom's vanity.

Hushai's eloquent reasoning managed to impress Absalom and his advisers more than Ahitophel's counsel, which is emphasized in verse 14 to be YHWH's will as the decisive factor.

== Hushai's warning saved David (17:15–29) ==
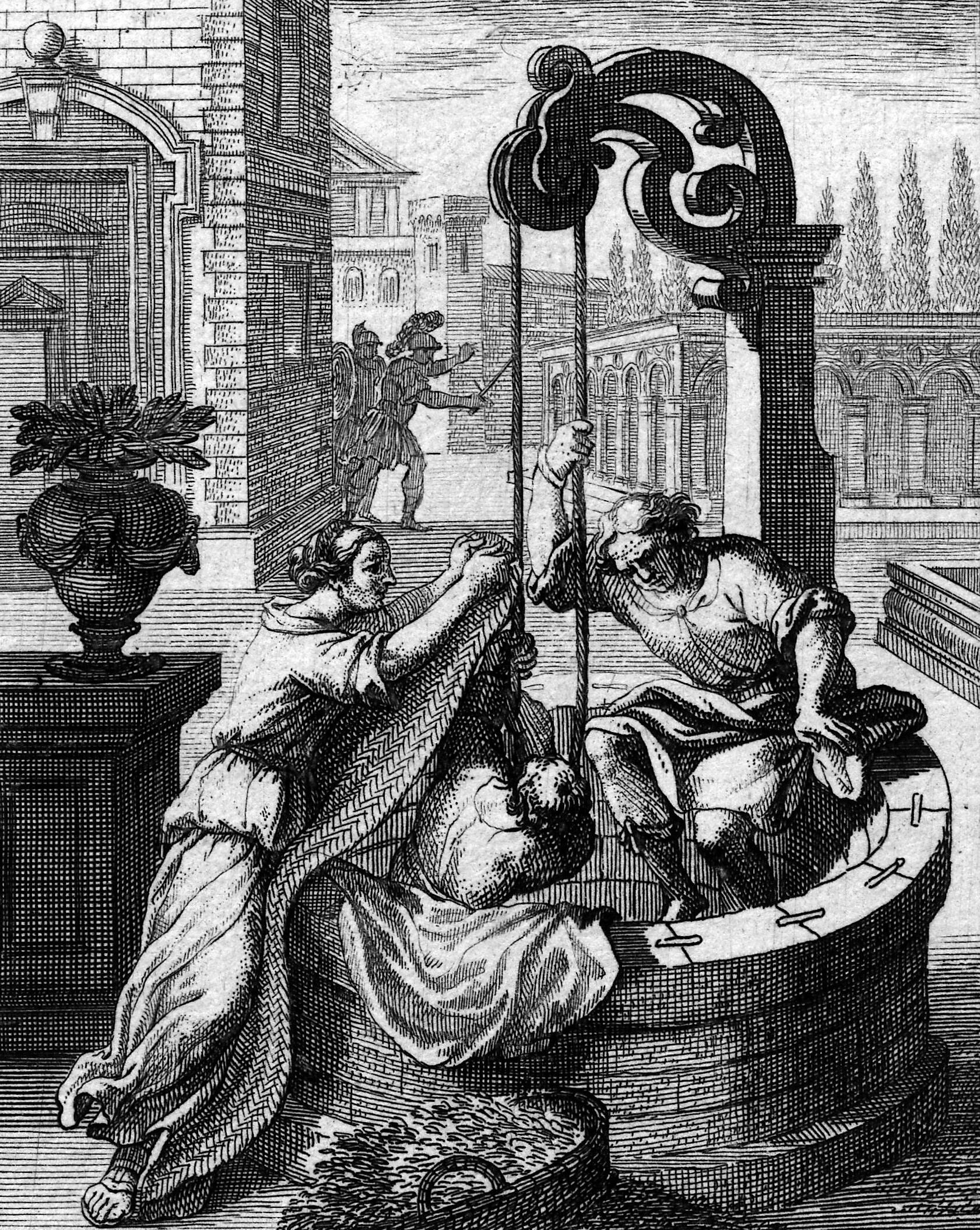
Jonathan and Ahimaaz hide from Absalom by Johann Christoph Weigel, 1695. This woodcut depicts an event recorded in 2 Samuel 17:17-21.

Hushai left Absalom's council right after giving his counsel before Absalom announced the final decision. He quickly sent a message to David to cross the Jordan immediately (verse 16) avoiding the possibility of a sudden attack as recommended by Ahithophel. Despite being spotted by Absalom's servants, the messengers, involving the sons of Abiathar (Jonathan) and Zadok (Ahimaaz) with the help of a girl informant, successfully transmitted the message to David who then safely crossed the Jordan River with his followers.

Three pieces of supplemental information are included in verses 23–29:.

1. The spurned Ahithophel committed suicide (verse 23), likely because of wounded pride, although it could also be of the fear of David's revenge.
2. The position as the head of the Israelite army was removed from Joab and given to Amasa, Joab's cousin through their mothers.
3. David received three powerful supports in Transjordan as he arrived in Mahanaim:

(1) Shobi son of Nahash, the Ammonite,
(2) Machir of the house of Saul, who had previously taken care of Mephibosheth, and
(3) Barzillai from Gilead (cf. 2 Samuel 19:31–39).

These people faithfully provide for David in his current condition.

== See also ==
- Abigail
- Ahithophel the Gilonite
- Ammiel
- Ammon
- Archite
- Ark of the Covenant
- Bahurim
- Chariot
- City Gate
- Enrogel
- Gilo
- Hanging
- Horses in warfare
- Ithra
- Jerusalem
- Kingdom of Israel
- Kohen
- Levites
- Lo-debar
- Rabbah
- Rogelim
- Suicide
- Zeruiah
- Related Bible parts: 2 Samuel 13, 2 Samuel 14

== Sources ==
=== Commentaries on Samuel ===
- Auld, Graeme (2003). "1 & 2 Samuel". In James D. G. Dunn and John William Rogerson (ed.). Eerdmans Commentary on the Bible. Eerdmans. ISBN 9780802837110.
- Bergen, David T. (1996). 1, 2 Samuel. B&H Publishing Group. ISBN 9780805401073.
- Chapman, Stephen B. (2016). 1 Samuel as Christian Scripture: A Theological Commentary. Wm. B. Eerdmans Publishing Company. ISBN 978-1467445160.
- Collins, John J. (2014). "Chapter 14: 1 Samuel 12 – 2 Samuel 25". Introduction to the Hebrew Scriptures. Fortress Press. pp. 277–296. ISBN 978-1451469233.
- Evans, Paul (2018). Longman, Tremper (ed.). 1-2 Samuel. The Story of God Bible Commentary. Zondervan Academic. ISBN 978-0310490944.
- Gordon, Robert (1986). I & II Samuel, A Commentary. Paternoster Press. ISBN 9780310230229.
- Hertzberg, Hans Wilhelm (1964). I & II Samuel, A Commentary (trans. from German 2nd edition 1960 ed.). Westminster John Knox Press. p. 19. ISBN 978-0664223182.
- Morrison, Craig E. (2013). Berit Olam: 2 Samuel. Liturgical Press. ISBN 978-0814682913.
- Steinmann, Andrew (2017). 2 Samuel. Concordia commentary: a theological exposition of sacred scripture. Concordia Publishing House. ISBN 9780758650061.

=== General ===
- Breytenbach, Andries (2000). "Who Is Behind The Samuel Narrative?". In Johannes Cornelis de Moor and H.F. Van Rooy (ed.). Past, Present, Future: the Deuteronomistic History and the Prophets. Brill. ISBN 9789004118713.
- Coogan, Michael David (2007). Coogan, Michael David; Brettler, Marc Zvi; Newsom, Carol Ann; Perkins, Pheme (eds.). The New Oxford Annotated Bible with the Apocryphal/Deuterocanonical Books: New Revised Standard Version, Issue 48 (Augmented 3rd ed.). Oxford University Press. ISBN 978-0195288810.
- Fitzmyer, Joseph A. (2008). A Guide to the Dead Sea Scrolls and Related Literature. Grand Rapids, MI: William B. Eerdmans Publishing Company. ISBN 9780802862419.
- Halley, Henry H. (1965). Halley's Bible Handbook: an abbreviated Bible commentary (24th (revised) ed.). Zondervan Publishing House. ISBN 0-310-25720-4.
- Hayes, Christine (2015). Introduction to the Bible. Yale University Press. ISBN 978-0300188271.
- Jones, Gwilym H. (2007). "12. 1 and 2 Samuel". In Barton, John; Muddiman, John (eds.). The Oxford Bible Commentary (first (paperback) ed.). Oxford University Press. pp. 196–232. ISBN 978-0199277186.
- Klein, R.W. (2003). "Samuel, books of". In Bromiley, Geoffrey W (ed.). The International Standard Bible Encyclopedia. Eerdmans. ISBN 9780802837844.
- Knight, Douglas A (1995). "Chapter 4 Deuteronomy and the Deuteronomists". In James Luther Mays, David L. Petersen and Kent Harold Richards (ed.). Old Testament Interpretation. T&T Clark. ISBN 9780567292896.
- McKane, William (1993). "Samuel, Book of". In Metzger, Bruce M; Coogan, Michael D (eds.). The Oxford Companion to the Bible. Oxford University Press. pp. 409–413. ISBN 978-0195046458.
- Ulrich, Eugene, ed. (2010). The Biblical Qumran Scrolls: Transcriptions and Textual Variants. Brill.
- Würthwein, Ernst (1995). The Text of the Old Testament. Translated by Rhodes, Erroll F. Grand Rapids, MI: Wm. B. Eerdmans. ISBN 0-8028-0788-7.
