= 2 Samuel 18 =

Second Book of Samuel chapter

- ← chapter 17 chapter 19 →
- The pages containing the Books of Samuel (1 & 2 Samuel) Leningrad Codex (1008 CE).
- Book: First book of Samuel
- Hebrew Bible part: Nevi'im
- Order in the Hebrew part: 3
- Category: Former Prophets
- Christian Bible part: Old Testament
- Order in the Christian part: 10

2 Samuel 18 is the eighteenth chapter of the Second Book of Samuel in the Old Testament of the Christian Bible or the second part of Books of Samuel in the Hebrew Bible. According to Jewish tradition the book was attributed to the prophet Samuel, with additions by the prophets Gad and Nathan, but modern scholars view it as a composition of a number of independent texts of various ages from c. 630–540 BCE. This chapter contains the account of David's reign in Jerusalem. This is within a section comprising 2 Samuel 9–20 and continued in 1 Kings 1–2, which deals with the power struggles among David's sons to succeed David's throne until "the kingdom was established in the hand of Solomon" (1 Kings 2:46).

== Text ==
This chapter was originally written in the Hebrew language. It is divided into 33 verses.

=== Textual witnesses ===
Some early manuscripts containing the text of this chapter in Hebrew are of the Masoretic Text tradition, which includes the Codex Cairensis (895), Aleppo Codex (10th century), and Codex Leningradensis (1008). Fragments containing parts of this chapter in Hebrew were found among the Dead Sea Scrolls including 4Q51 (4QSam^{a}; 100–50 BCE) with extant verses 1–11, 28–29.

Extant ancient manuscripts of a translation into Koine Greek known as the Septuagint (originally was made in the last few centuries BCE) include Codex Vaticanus (B; $\mathfrak{G}$^{B}; 4th century) and Codex Alexandrinus (A; $\mathfrak{G}$^{A}; 5th century). (Note: The whole book of 2 Samuel is missing from the extant Codex Sinaiticus.)

== Analysis ==
The story of Absalom's rebellion can be observed as five consecutive episodes:

A. David's flight from Jerusalem (15:13–16:14)

B. The victorious Absalom and his counselors (16:15–17:14)

C. David reaches Mahanaim (17:15–29)

B'. The rebellion is crushed and Absalom is executed (18:1–19:8abc)

A'. David's reentry into Jerusalem (19:8d–20:3)

God's role seems to be understated in the whole events, but is disclosed by a seemingly insignificant detail: 'the crossing of the Jordan river'. The Hebrew root word' 'br, "to cross" (in various nominal and verbal forms) is used more than 30 times in these chapters (compared to 20 times in the rest of 2 Samuel) to report David's flight from Jerusalem, his crossing of the Jordan river, and his reentry into Jerusalem. In 2 Samuel 17:16, stating that David should cross the Jordan (17:16), the verb 'br is even reinforced by a 'Hebrew infinitive absolute' to mark this critical moment: "king David is about to cross out of the land of Israel." David's future was in doubt until it was stated that God had rendered foolish Ahithophel's good counsel to Absalom (2 Samuel 17:14), thus granting David's prayer (15:31), and saving David from Absalom's further actions. Once Absalom was defeated, David's crossing back over the Jordan echoes the Israelites' first crossing over the Jordan under Joshua's leadership (Joshua 1–4):

1. Both David and Joshua crossed the Jordan and came to Gilgal (Joshua 4:19; 2 Samuel 19:40).
2. Both were assisted by women who hid the good spies to save the mission: Rahab in Joshua 2:1–21 and the woman of Bahurim in 2 Samuel 17:20.
3. Both episodes include the Ark of the Covenant, although David prevented the ark from crossing out of the land of Israel (15:25; referring to areas west of Jordan river).

Here God's role is not as explicit as during Joshua's crossing, but the signs are clear that God was with David, just as with Joshua.

== Death of Absalom (verses 1–18) ==
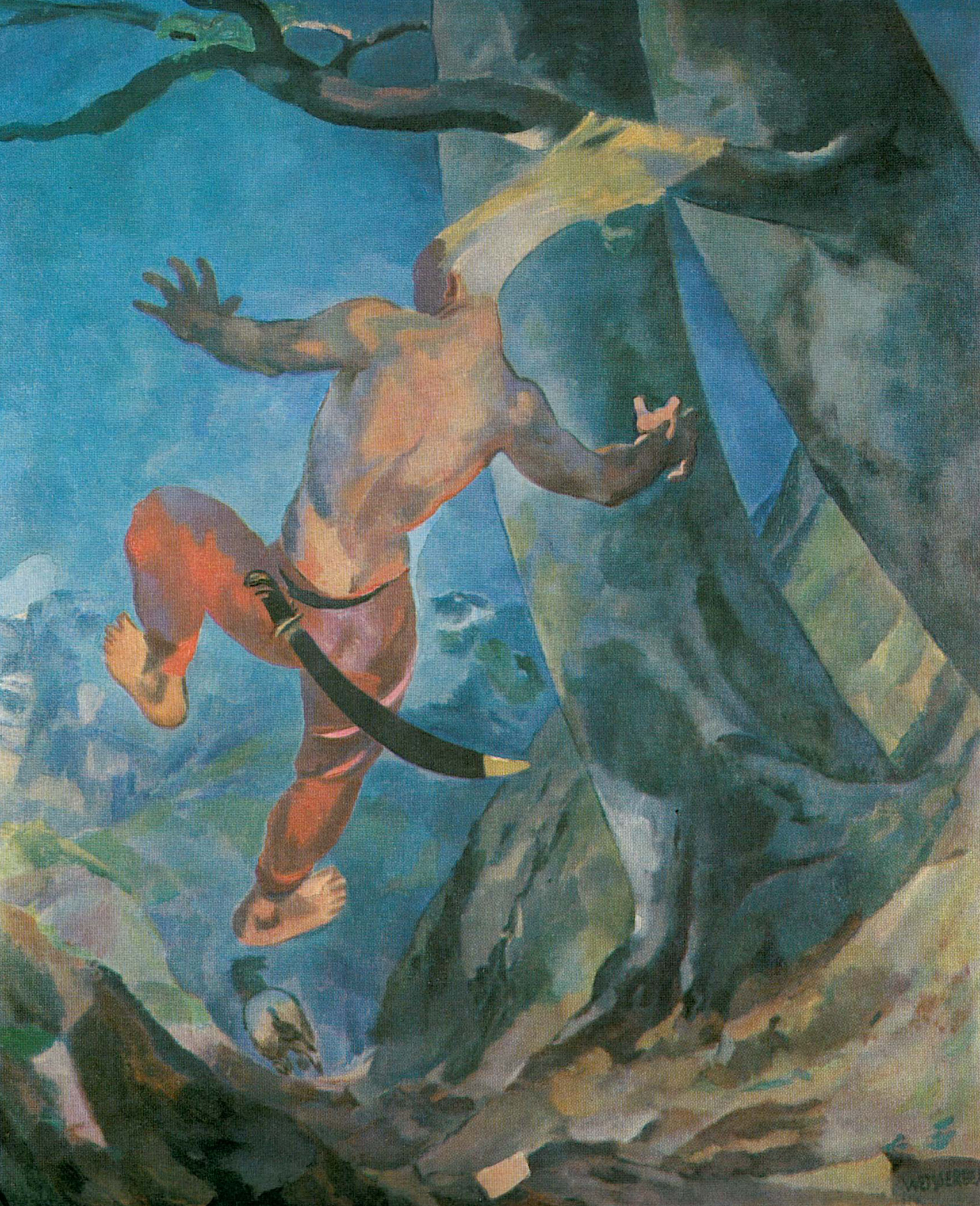
"Absalom" by Albert Weisgerber, 1912.

Hushai's successful counsel to Absalom gave David enough time to organize his troops. By the time for battle David had three groups of army, which was a traditional division at that time (cf. Judges 7:16; 1 Samuel 11:11). David was prevented by his men from marching out with them (verse 3), so he would not be in harm way as would happen to Absalom later. The narrative emphasizes that David should not be implicated in Absalom's death as he was not with the army and he gave specific instructions to his three commanders to 'deal gently' with Absalom, which were also heard by all the people. The battle is briefly described that 'the men of Israel', supporters of Absalom, were defeated by 'the servants of David', who were better placed to take advantage of the wooded terrain, made treacherous by the large pits, called 'the forest of Ephraim' (verse 17). Absalom became victim to the forest, that his phenomenal long hair (cf. 2 Samuel 14:26; cf. Josephus, Ant. 7 paragraph 239) got caught in the branches of a tree as his mule made its way under it, and 'he was left hanging' in mid-air. A man who reported Absalom's situation was originally offered a reward by Joab to kill Absalom, but he had three good reasons to refuse:

1. his unwillingness to kill a king's son
2. his obedience to David's known wish,
3. his realization that Joab would not protect him from David's wrath (verses 12–13).

Ignoring David's command to deal gently with Absalom, Joab himself thrust three spears at once through Absalom's heart and left his ten armorbearers beating the prince to death (verse 15). As the rebels' leader was dead, Joab suspended hostilities, as this was not a war between the people but more on an individual. Absalom's dead body was thrown into a pit by the troops and they heaped stones over him; this was not a respectable burial (cf. Joshua 7:26; 8:29), but Absalom had during his lifetime erected a memorial for himself in the Jerusalem area (verse 18) and this monument could be the one related to the Tomb of Absalom in the Kidron Valley.

=== Verse 18 ===
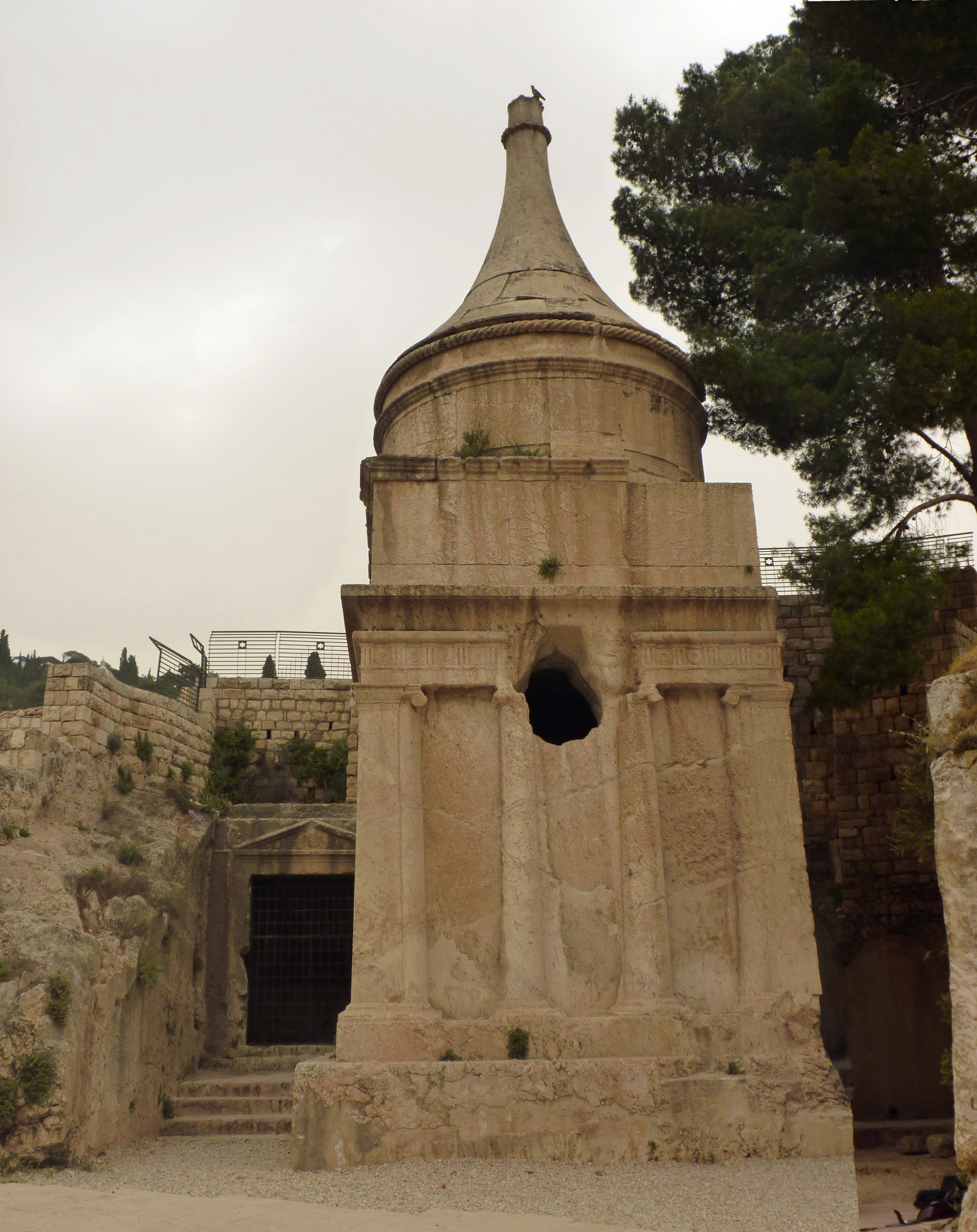
"Tomb of Absalom" or "Absalom's Pillar" in the Kidron Valley near Jerusalem.

Now Absalom in his lifetime had taken and set up a pillar for himself, which is in the King’s Valley. For he said, "I have no son to keep my name in remembrance." He called the pillar after his own name. And to this day it is called Absalom’s Monument.

The pillar may be a "monument". This "King's Valley" may be the same place as where Bera, King of Sodom, and Melchizedek, King of Salem, met with Abraham in Genesis 14:17.

== David mourned the death of Absalom (verses 19–33) ==
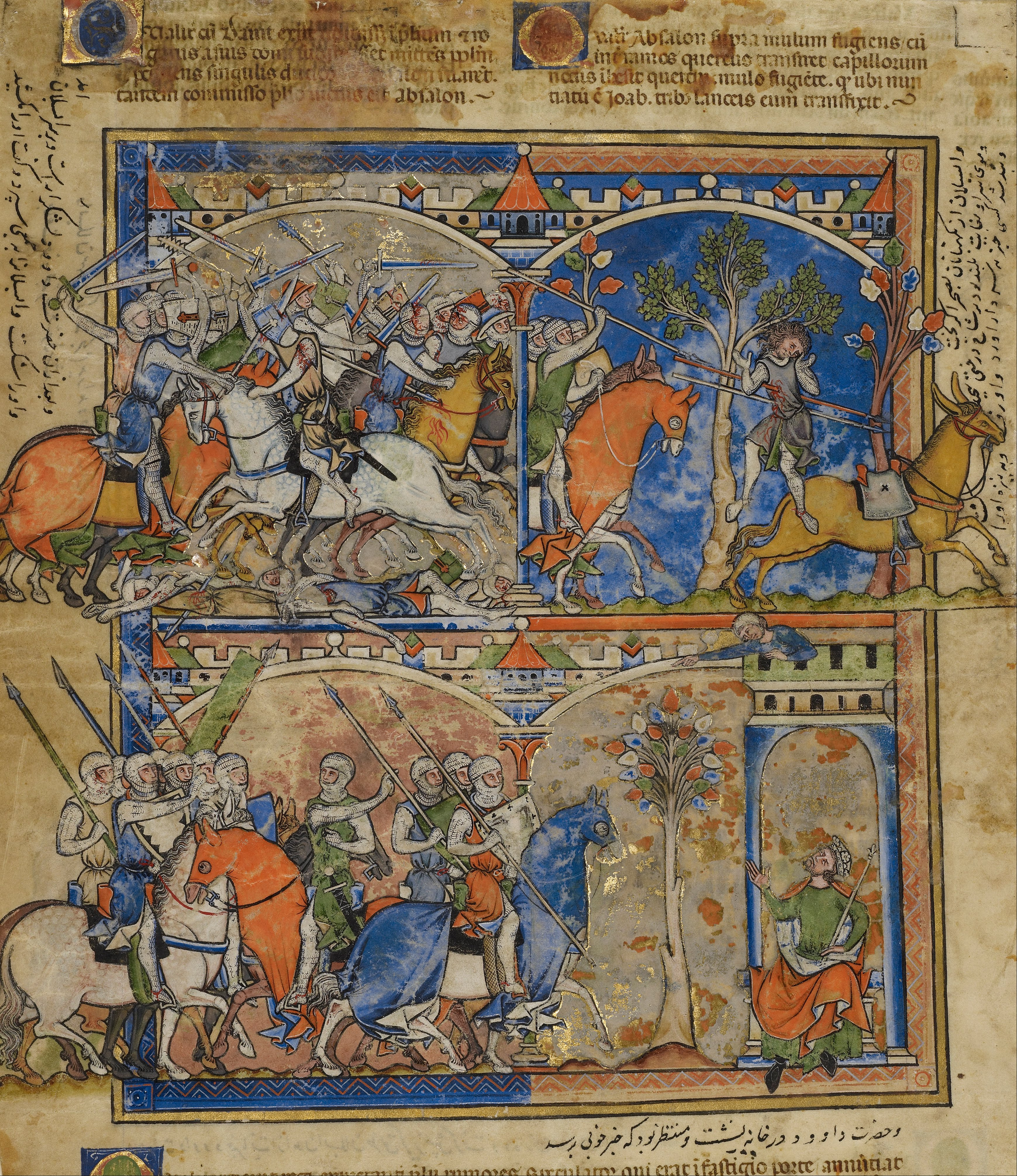
Top: "The Death of Absalom". Bottom: "David anxiously awaits news of the battle, his eyes directed up at a servant, who points to the approaching riders, and at the scene of his son's death above". An illustration from Maciejowski Bible (1240s) at Getty Center

The next drama is about the transmission of the battle outcome to David. Ahimaaz who was unaware of Absalom's death (verses 28–29), offered and went out to bring the message, but Joab could not rely on Ahimaaz to make that report as positively as he would wish, so Joab sent another messenger, a Cushite, to speak of good news despite Absalom's death. Ahimaaz who arrived first could only report that 'all was well' for David's side, but was unable to answer the question about Absalom. The Cushite brought the same good news, but, gave him the news of Absalom's death with a positive slant (verse 32). David understood the news and began a period of mourning for Absalom (verse 33), which continues into the next chapter.

== See also ==
- Abishai
- Ammiel
- Ammon
- Archite
- Ark of the Covenant
- Bahurim
- Cushite
- Gittite
- Ittai
- Jerusalem
- King David's Warriors
- Kingdom of Israel
- Shekel
- Wood of Ephraim
- Zadok
- Zeruiah
- Related Bible parts: 2 Samuel 13, 2 Samuel 14, 2 Samuel 15, 2 Samuel 16, 2 Samuel 17

== Sources ==
=== Commentaries on Samuel ===
- Auld, Graeme (2003). "1 & 2 Samuel". In James D. G. Dunn and John William Rogerson (ed.). Eerdmans Commentary on the Bible. Eerdmans. ISBN 9780802837110.
- Bergen, David T. (1996). 1, 2 Samuel. B&H Publishing Group. ISBN 9780805401073.
- Chapman, Stephen B. (2016). 1 Samuel as Christian Scripture: A Theological Commentary. Wm. B. Eerdmans Publishing Company. ISBN 978-1467445160.
- Collins, John J. (2014). "Chapter 14: 1 Samuel 12 – 2 Samuel 25". Introduction to the Hebrew Scriptures. Fortress Press. pp. 277–296. ISBN 978-1451469233.
- Evans, Paul (2018). Longman, Tremper (ed.). 1-2 Samuel. The Story of God Bible Commentary. Zondervan Academic. ISBN 978-0310490944.
- Gordon, Robert (1986). I & II Samuel, A Commentary. Paternoster Press. ISBN 9780310230229.
- Hertzberg, Hans Wilhelm (1964). I & II Samuel, A Commentary (trans. from German 2nd edition 1960 ed.). Westminster John Knox Press. p. 19. ISBN 978-0664223182.
- Morrison, Craig E. (2013). Berit Olam: 2 Samuel. Liturgical Press. ISBN 978-0814682913.
- Steinmann, Andrew (2017). 2 Samuel. Concordia commentary: a theological exposition of sacred scripture. Concordia Publishing House. ISBN 9780758650061.

=== General ===
- Breytenbach, Andries (2000). "Who Is Behind The Samuel Narrative?". In Johannes Cornelis de Moor and H.F. Van Rooy (ed.). Past, Present, Future: the Deuteronomistic History and the Prophets. Brill. ISBN 9789004118713.
- Coogan, Michael David (2007). Coogan, Michael David; Brettler, Marc Zvi; Newsom, Carol Ann; Perkins, Pheme (eds.). The New Oxford Annotated Bible with the Apocryphal/Deuterocanonical Books: New Revised Standard Version, Issue 48 (Augmented 3rd ed.). Oxford University Press. ISBN 978-0195288810.
- Fitzmyer, Joseph A. (2008). A Guide to the Dead Sea Scrolls and Related Literature. Grand Rapids, MI: William B. Eerdmans Publishing Company. ISBN 9780802862419.
- Halley, Henry H. (1965). Halley's Bible Handbook: an abbreviated Bible commentary (24th (revised) ed.). Zondervan Publishing House. ISBN 0-310-25720-4.
- Hayes, Christine (2015). Introduction to the Bible. Yale University Press. ISBN 978-0300188271.
- Jones, Gwilym H. (2007). "12. 1 and 2 Samuel". In Barton, John; Muddiman, John (eds.). The Oxford Bible Commentary (first (paperback) ed.). Oxford University Press. pp. 196–232. ISBN 978-0199277186.
- Klein, R.W. (2003). "Samuel, books of". In Bromiley, Geoffrey W (ed.). The International Standard Bible Encyclopedia. Eerdmans. ISBN 9780802837844.
- Knight, Douglas A (1995). "Chapter 4 Deuteronomy and the Deuteronomists". In James Luther Mays, David L. Petersen and Kent Harold Richards (ed.). Old Testament Interpretation. T&T Clark. ISBN 9780567292896.
- McKane, William (1993). "Samuel, Book of". In Metzger, Bruce M; Coogan, Michael D (eds.). The Oxford Companion to the Bible. Oxford University Press. pp. 409–413. ISBN 978-0195046458.
- Ulrich, Eugene, ed. (2010). The Biblical Qumran Scrolls: Transcriptions and Textual Variants. Brill.
- Würthwein, Ernst (1995). The Text of the Old Testament. Translated by Rhodes, Erroll F. Grand Rapids, MI: Wm. B. Eerdmans. ISBN 0-8028-0788-7.
