= 2 Samuel 16 =

Second Book of Samuel chapter

- ← chapter 15 chapter 17 →
- The pages containing the Books of Samuel (1 & 2 Samuel) Leningrad Codex (1008 CE).
- Book: First book of Samuel
- Hebrew Bible part: Nevi'im
- Order in the Hebrew part: 3
- Category: Former Prophets
- Christian Bible part: Old Testament
- Order in the Christian part: 10

2 Samuel 16 is the sixteenth chapter of the Second Book of Samuel in the Old Testament of the Christian Bible or the second part of Books of Samuel in the Hebrew Bible. According to Jewish tradition the book was attributed to the prophet Samuel, with additions by the prophets Gad and Nathan, but modern scholars view it as a composition of a number of independent texts of various ages from c. 630–540 BCE. This chapter contains the account of David's reign in Jerusalem. This is within a section comprising 2 Samuel 9–20 and continued to 1 Kings 1–2 which deal with the power struggles among David's sons to succeed David's throne until 'the kingdom was established in the hand of Solomon' (1 Kings 2:46).

== Text ==
This chapter was originally written in the Hebrew language. It is divided into 23 verses.

=== Textual witnesses ===
Some early manuscripts containing the text of this chapter in Hebrew are of the Masoretic Text tradition, which includes the Codex Cairensis (895), Aleppo Codex (10th century), and Codex Leningradensis (1008). Fragments containing parts of this chapter in Hebrew were found among the Dead Sea Scrolls including 4Q51 (4QSam^{a}; 100–50 BCE) with extant verses 1–2, 6–8, 10–13, 17–18, 20–22.

Extant ancient manuscripts of a translation into Koine Greek known as the Septuagint (originally was made in the last few centuries BCE) include Codex Vaticanus (B; $\mathfrak{G}$^{B}; 4th century) and Codex Alexandrinus (A; $\mathfrak{G}$^{A}; 5th century). (Note: The whole book of 2 Samuel is missing from the extant Codex Sinaiticus.)

== Analysis ==
The story of Absalom's rebellion can be observed as five consecutive episodes:

A. David's flight from Jerusalem (15:13–16:14)

B. The victorious Absalom and his counselors (16:15–17:14)

C. David reaches Mahanaim (17:15–29)

B'. The rebellion is crushed and Absalom is executed (18:1–19:8abc)

A'. David's reentry into Jerusalem (19:8d–20:3)

God's role seems to be understated in the whole events, but is disclosed by a seemingly insignificant detail: 'the crossing of the Jordan river'. The Hebrew root word' 'br, "to cross" (in various nominal and verbal forms) is used more than 30 times in these chapters (compared to 20 times in the rest of 2 Samuel) to report David's flight from Jerusalem, his crossing of the Jordan river, and his reentry into Jerusalem. In 2 Samuel 17:16, stating that David should cross the Jordan (17:16), the verb 'br is even reinforced by a 'Hebrew infinitive absolute' to mark this critical moment: "king David is about to cross out of the land of Israel." David's future was in doubt until it was stated that God had rendered foolish Ahithophel's good counsel to Absalom (2 Samuel 17:14), thus granting David's prayer (15:31), and saving David from Absalom's further actions. Once Absalom was defeated, David's crossing back over the Jordan echoes the Israelites' first crossing over the Jordan under Joshua's leadership (Joshua 1–4):

1. Both David and Joshua crossed the Jordan and came to Gilgal (Joshua 4:19; 2 Samuel 19:40).
2. Both were assisted by women who hid the good spies to save the mission: Rahab in Joshua 2:1–21 and the woman of Bahurim in 2 Samuel 17:20.
3. Both episodes include the Ark of the Covenant, although David prevented the ark from crossing out of the land of Israel (15:25; referring to areas west of Jordan river).

Here God's role is not as explicit as during Joshua's crossing, but the signs are clear that God was with David, just as with Joshua.

== David fled from Jerusalem (16:1–14) ==
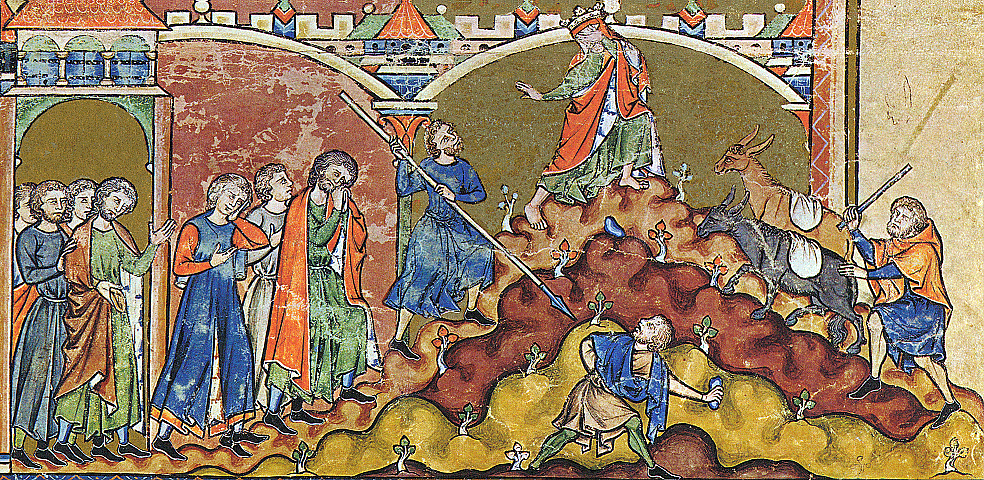
"David flees Jerusalem after Absalom's conspiracy. Ziba (on the right) brings provisions". An illustration in Maciejowski Bible (1240s)

This section continues the last one (2 Samuel 15:13–37), where David had the first three of five meetings on his way out of Jerusalem, with two other meetings —this time with two persons connected with the house of Saul.

The first meeting was with Ziba, the servant of Mephibosheth (verses 1–4), who brought provisions for David and reported that Mephibosheth had decided to stay in Jerusalem, thinking that Saul's kingdom was to be returned to him. Later, Mephibosheth's words in 19:27–29 disputed this. However, at this time without a chance to investigate and against his better judgement, David accepted Ziba's report and granted him all of Saul's estates.

The second meeting took place at Bahurim on the edge of the wilderness, where another Saulide called Shimei came out (verses 5–14) cursing David and calling him 'Murderer', while interpreting Absalom's take-over of the kingdom as God's revenge for 'the blood of the house of Saul' on David (verse 8). There are some possibilities of David's alleged crime:

1. the execution of seven members of Saul's family at Gibeon (2 Samuel 21:1–14),
2. the death of Abner (2 Samuel 3) and Ishbosheth (=Ishbaal; 2 Samuel 4), for which David could have been held responsible, or
3. the deaths of Saul and Jonathan at Mount Gilboa (1 Samuel 31; 2 Samuel 1), for which David was implicated because at that time he had gone over to the Philistines.

David was unwilling to take action against Shimei, accepting the possibility that Shimei was cursing on YHWH's order (verse 10), so David resigned to God's will without protest (cf. 1 Samuel 26:9–11). The conversation with Abishai about killing Shimei mirrors the one about killing Saul in 1 Samuel 26 as follows:

1 Samuel 26:8–11	2 Samuel 16:9–12
26:8a Abishai speaks to David.	16:9a Abishai speaks to David.
26:8b Abishai comments on the situation at hand: God has given Saul into David's hand	16:9b Abishai comments on the situation at hand: Why should Shimei revile the king?
26:8c Abishai proposes to kill David's enemy for David	16:9c Abishai proposes to kill David's enemy for David
26:9 David prevents Abishai from killing Saul.	16:10a David prevents Abishai from killing Shimei.
26:10 David invokes God to impede Abishai	16:10b David invokes God to impede Abishai
26:11 David invokes God a second time	16:11-12 David invokes God a second time.

== Absalom entered Jerusalem (16:15–23) ==
Absalom entered Jerusalem as a victor, and greeted by Hushai, called as "David's friend", with the standard acclamation, 'Long live the king' to declare his allegiance to the new king (verse 16). Absalom instinctively suspected Hushai's signs of disloyalty to David, but was persuaded that Hushai considered Absalom to be God's elect and king by public acclamation and promised him the same loyalty as he had shown his father (verse 18).

As soon as he set himself in Jerusalem, Absalom unwisely accepted Ahitophel's advice (which was "esteemed and regarded as divine guidance" in verse 23) to go to his father's harem (cf. 2 Samuel 12:8; 1 Kings 2:22–23), thereby publicly declaring his claim to the throne, which in fact he had already taken. Ahitophel reasoned that such action was a decisive break of relations between son and father which would consolidate support from the anti-Davidic camp.

By having two wisest counsellors of that age (Ahitophel and Hushai), Absalom might be assured himself of success, without any thought of consulting YHWH (through the priests and the Ark of the Covenant), but this would be Absalom undoing, because Hushai would never counsel him to do wisely, whereas Ahitophel counselled him to do wickedly, basically to sin against YHWH.

=== Verse 18 ===
And Hushai said to Absalom, "No, but whom the LORD and this people and all the men of Israel choose, his I will be, and with him I will remain."

Hushai's reply to Absalom's suspicion of his loyalty contains ambiguities, because, without mentioning any name, this circumlocution or descriptive character of the king of Israel would better fit David, whom the Lord had demonstratively chosen and the people of Israel had publicly anointed, instead of Absalom, who at this time had neither.

- "This people": which refers to 'the citizens of Jerusalem' who had given general lamentation at David's departure (2 Samuel 15:23) and had not embraced Absalom as their new king.

== See also ==
- Archite
- Belial
- Concubinage
- Gera
- Jerusalem
- Kingdom of Israel
- Mount of Olives
- Oracle
- Tribe of Benjamin
- Zeruiah
- Related Bible parts: 2 Samuel 12, 2 Samuel 13, 2 Samuel 14, 2 Samuel 15

== Sources ==
=== Commentaries on Samuel ===
- Auld, Graeme (2003). "1 & 2 Samuel". In James D. G. Dunn and John William Rogerson (ed.). Eerdmans Commentary on the Bible. Eerdmans. ISBN 9780802837110.
- Bergen, David T. (1996). 1, 2 Samuel. B&H Publishing Group. ISBN 9780805401073.
- Chapman, Stephen B. (2016). 1 Samuel as Christian Scripture: A Theological Commentary. Wm. B. Eerdmans Publishing Company. ISBN 978-1467445160.
- Collins, John J. (2014). "Chapter 14: 1 Samuel 12 – 2 Samuel 25". Introduction to the Hebrew Scriptures. Fortress Press. pp. 277–296. ISBN 978-1451469233.
- Evans, Paul (2018). Longman, Tremper (ed.). 1-2 Samuel. The Story of God Bible Commentary. Zondervan Academic. ISBN 978-0310490944.
- Gordon, Robert (1986). I & II Samuel, A Commentary. Paternoster Press. ISBN 9780310230229.
- Hertzberg, Hans Wilhelm (1964). I & II Samuel, A Commentary (trans. from German 2nd edition 1960 ed.). Westminster John Knox Press. p. 19. ISBN 978-0664223182.
- Morrison, Craig E. (2013). Berit Olam: 2 Samuel. Liturgical Press. ISBN 978-0814682913.
- Steinmann, Andrew (2017). 2 Samuel. Concordia commentary: a theological exposition of sacred scripture. Concordia Publishing House. ISBN 9780758650061.

=== General ===
- Breytenbach, Andries (2000). "Who Is Behind The Samuel Narrative?". In Johannes Cornelis de Moor and H.F. Van Rooy (ed.). Past, Present, Future: the Deuteronomistic History and the Prophets. Brill. ISBN 9789004118713.
- Coogan, Michael David (2007). Coogan, Michael David; Brettler, Marc Zvi; Newsom, Carol Ann; Perkins, Pheme (eds.). The New Oxford Annotated Bible with the Apocryphal/Deuterocanonical Books: New Revised Standard Version, Issue 48 (Augmented 3rd ed.). Oxford University Press. ISBN 978-0195288810.
- Fitzmyer, Joseph A. (2008). A Guide to the Dead Sea Scrolls and Related Literature. Grand Rapids, MI: William B. Eerdmans Publishing Company. ISBN 9780802862419.
- Halley, Henry H. (1965). Halley's Bible Handbook: an abbreviated Bible commentary (24th (revised) ed.). Zondervan Publishing House. ISBN 0-310-25720-4.
- Hayes, Christine (2015). Introduction to the Bible. Yale University Press. ISBN 978-0300188271.
- Jones, Gwilym H. (2007). "12. 1 and 2 Samuel". In Barton, John; Muddiman, John (eds.). The Oxford Bible Commentary (first (paperback) ed.). Oxford University Press. pp. 196–232. ISBN 978-0199277186.
- Klein, R.W. (2003). "Samuel, books of". In Bromiley, Geoffrey W (ed.). The International Standard Bible Encyclopedia. Eerdmans. ISBN 9780802837844.
- Knight, Douglas A (1995). "Chapter 4 Deuteronomy and the Deuteronomists". In James Luther Mays, David L. Petersen and Kent Harold Richards (ed.). Old Testament Interpretation. T&T Clark. ISBN 9780567292896.
- McKane, William (1993). "Samuel, Book of". In Metzger, Bruce M; Coogan, Michael D (eds.). The Oxford Companion to the Bible. Oxford University Press. pp. 409–413. ISBN 978-0195046458.
- Ulrich, Eugene, ed. (2010). The Biblical Qumran Scrolls: Transcriptions and Textual Variants. Brill.
- Würthwein, Ernst (1995). The Text of the Old Testament. Translated by Rhodes, Erroll F. Grand Rapids, MI: Wm. B. Eerdmans. ISBN 0-8028-0788-7.
