= 2 Samuel 11 =

Second Book of Samuel chapter

- ← chapter 10 chapter 12 →
- The pages containing the Books of Samuel (1 & 2 Samuel) Leningrad Codex (1008 CE).
- Book: First book of Samuel
- Hebrew Bible part: Nevi'im
- Order in the Hebrew part: 3
- Category: Former Prophets
- Christian Bible part: Old Testament
- Order in the Christian part: 10

2 Samuel 11 is the eleventh chapter of the Second Book of Samuel in the Old Testament of the Christian Bible or the second part of Books of Samuel in the Hebrew Bible. According to Jewish tradition the book was attributed to the prophet Samuel, with additions by the prophets Gad and Nathan, but modern scholars view it as a composition of a number of independent texts of various ages from c. 630–540 BCE. This chapter contains the account of David's reign in Jerusalem. This is within a section comprising 2 Samuel 9–20 and continued to 1 Kings 1–2 which deal with the power struggles among David's sons to succeed David's throne until 'the kingdom was established in the hand of Solomon' (1 Kings 2:46).

== Text ==
This chapter was originally written in the Hebrew language. It is divided into 27 verses.

=== Textual witnesses ===
Some early manuscripts containing the text of this chapter in Hebrew are of the Masoretic Text tradition, which includes the Codex Cairensis (895), Aleppo Codex (10th century), and Codex Leningradensis (1008). Fragments containing parts of this chapter in Hebrew were found among the Dead Sea Scrolls including 4Q51 (4QSam^{a}; 100–50 BCE) with extant verses 2–12, 15–20.

Extant ancient manuscripts of a translation into Koine Greek known as the Septuagint (originally was made in the last few centuries BCE) include Codex Vaticanus (B; $\mathfrak{G}$^{B}; 4th century) and Codex Alexandrinus (A; $\mathfrak{G}$^{A}; 5th century). (Note: The whole book of 2 Samuel is missing from the extant Codex Sinaiticus.)

== Analysis ==
Chapters 11 and 12, which pertain to David, Bathsheba, and Uriah, form one episode that is concentrically structured in eleven scenes:

A. David sends Joab and the army to attack Rabbah (11:1)

B. David sleeps with Bathsheba, the wife of Uriah (11:2–5)

C. David and Uriah: David arranges Uriah's death (11:6–13)

D. David to Joab: Uriah must die (11:14–17)

E. Joab to David: Joab's news comes to David (11:18–25)

F. David ushers the wife of Uriah into his house. The Lord is displeased (11:26–27)

E'. Nathan to David: God's news comes to David (12:1–7a)

D'. Nathan to David: the child will die (12:7b–15a)

C'. David and the child: God ensures the child's death (12:15b–23)

B'. David sleeps with Bathsheba, his wife (12:24–25)

A'. Joab and David conquer Rabbah (12:26–31)

The whole episode is framed by the battle against Rabbah, the Ammonite capital, beginning with David dispatching Joab and the army to besiege the city, then concluding by the capitulation of the city to David (A/A'). Both B/B' scenes recount that David slept with Bathsheba, who conceived each time. Scenes C and D recount the plot that got Uriah killed, whereas C' and D' report God's response to David's crime: the child would die. The E/E' sections contrast David's reaction to the death of Uriah to his reaction to the slaughter of a ewe lamb in Nathan's parable. The turning point in the episode (F) states the divine displeasure to these events.

This episode of David's disgrace has a profound effect in the later memory of David's fidelity to the Lord: "David did what was right in the sight of the LORD, and did not turn aside from anything that he commanded him all the days of his life, except in the matter of Uriah the Hittite” (1 Kings 15:5), while it is skipped it completely in the Books of Chronicles (see 1 Chronicles 20:1–2).

== David and Bathsheba (11:1–13) ==
Military activities in the Middle East generally started in the spring, after the end of the winter rains, and this was when the Israelite troops under Joab were dispatched in the continuation of the siege to Rabbah (from the last chapter, while David stayed behind (cf. 2 Samuel 10:7–14). This turns to be the setting for David's downfall: providing him with an opportunity to see Bathsheba bathing and then to commit adultery with her. David's misbehavior is reported openly and honestly, without any mitigation nor explanation for his motivation.

=== Verse 3 ===
And David sent and inquired about the woman.
And one said, “Is not this Bathsheba, the daughter of Eliam, the wife of Uriah the Hittite?”

- "Eliam": Bathsheba's father, identified in 2 Samuel 23:34 as the son of Ahitophel. His name is written as Ammiel (= people of God), instead of Eliam (= God of the people), in 1 Chronicles 3:5 (which wrote Bathsheba as "Bath-shua"). Eliam could be the same as Uriah's brother-officer in the list of David's Mighty Warriors in 2 Samuel 23:34. The fact that Bathsheba was the granddaughter of David's advisor Ahitophel of Gilo, (as also noted in the Talmud) could explain Ahitophel's advices to Absalom (2 Samuel 15:12) as an act of revenge for the seduction of his granddaughter and the murder of her husband.
- "Uriah the Hittite": Bathsheba's husband, one of 'David's Mighty Warriors'. In 4QSam^{a}, he is said to be Joab's armorbearer. The appellation 'the Hittite' may denote the family origin of someone born in Israel, as the divine 'Yah' element in his name suggests. In Matthew 1:6, "the wife of Uriah" is mentioned as one of the ancestors of Jesus.

=== Verse 4 ===
And David sent messengers, and took her; and she came in unto him, and he lay with her; for she was purified from her uncleanness: and she returned unto her house.

- "Purified from her uncleanness": that is "purifying herself after menstruation"; after the passing of the seven days of ritual impurity (Leviticus 15:19). This is considered as the best possible period for conception, as attested in other ancient document.

== David arranged Uriah to be killed (11:14–25) ==
David realized his sin on sleeping with Bathsheba in the eyes of the law (Deuteronomy 22:22), so he tried to cast paternity of Bathsheba's pregnancy on Uriah. Under the pretext of getting news about the battle against Ammon David called Uriah from the battleground; he then persuaded him to go home and 'wash your feet', a euphemism for 'having intercourse with his wife'. Although on leave, Uriah maintained the ritual purity expected during battle (cf Deuteronomy 23:9–14; Joshua 3:5) — he claimed that it is wrong to enjoy comforts when the ark was 'in booths' and his fellow soldiers encamped— so he resisted the David's persuasion and efforts to make him drunk through food and wine. Eventually, Uriah was commanded to carry a letter which would lead him to certain death: David's secret message to Joab to assign Uriah to the frontmost line. Uriah apparently did not read the letter (presumably sealed). Joab executed David's wish by placing Uriah and some of his soldier under the city wall, an action which had proved fatal in the case of Abimelech (Judges 9:52–53) and here caused the death of Uriah, along with, according to the LXX^{L} , eighteen other soldiers. Thereafter, Joab sent a message to David conveying the news of the battle with a vital information about Uriah's death, and David sent back to Joab a hidden message of acceptance and encouragement.

== David married Bathsheba (11:26–27) ==
After the mourning period of Uriah's death was over, David took Uriah's widow, Bathsheba, to be his wife and in the course of time she gave birth to a son. David's actions were not explained, but the last statement of the passage (11:27b) clearly states that David's behavior was unacceptable to God.

=== Verse 27 ===
And when the mourning was over, David sent and brought her to his house, and she became his wife and bore him a son.
But the thing that David had done displeased the LORD.

- "The mourning": refers to the customary seven-day period of mourning for death (1 Samuel 31:13; Genesis 50:10), such as with Abigail in 1 Samuel 25:39–42.
- "Displeased God" or "was evil in the eyes of God", because according to the law (Leviticus 20:10), both David and Bathsheba should have been put to death.

== See also ==
- Abimelech
- Alcohol intoxication
- Ammon
- Ark of the Covenant
- Jerubbesheth
- Jerusalem
- Israel
- Tribe of Judah
- Tubas
- Related Bible parts: Leviticus 20, Deuteronomy 22, 2 Samuel 23, 1 Kings 15

== Sources ==
=== Commentaries on Samuel ===
- Auld, Graeme (2003). "1 & 2 Samuel". In James D. G. Dunn and John William Rogerson (ed.). Eerdmans Commentary on the Bible. Eerdmans. ISBN 9780802837110.
- Bergen, David T. (1996). 1, 2 Samuel. B&H Publishing Group. ISBN 9780805401073.
- Chapman, Stephen B. (2016). 1 Samuel as Christian Scripture: A Theological Commentary. Wm. B. Eerdmans Publishing Company. ISBN 978-1467445160.
- Collins, John J. (2014). "Chapter 14: 1 Samuel 12 – 2 Samuel 25". Introduction to the Hebrew Scriptures. Fortress Press. pp. 277–296. ISBN 978-1451469233.
- Evans, Paul (2018). Longman, Tremper (ed.). 1-2 Samuel. The Story of God Bible Commentary. Zondervan Academic. ISBN 978-0310490944.
- Gordon, Robert (1986). I & II Samuel, A Commentary. Paternoster Press. ISBN 9780310230229.
- Hertzberg, Hans Wilhelm (1964). I & II Samuel, A Commentary (trans. from German 2nd edition 1960 ed.). Westminster John Knox Press. p. 19. ISBN 978-0664223182.
- Morrison, Craig E. (2013). Berit Olam: 2 Samuel. Liturgical Press. ISBN 978-0814682913.
- Steinmann, Andrew (2017). 2 Samuel. Concordia commentary: a theological exposition of sacred scripture. Concordia Publishing House. ISBN 9780758650061.

=== General ===
- Breytenbach, Andries (2000). "Who Is Behind The Samuel Narrative?". In Johannes Cornelis de Moor and H.F. Van Rooy (ed.). Past, Present, Future: the Deuteronomistic History and the Prophets. Brill. ISBN 9789004118713.
- Coogan, Michael David (2007). Coogan, Michael David; Brettler, Marc Zvi; Newsom, Carol Ann; Perkins, Pheme (eds.). The New Oxford Annotated Bible with the Apocryphal/Deuterocanonical Books: New Revised Standard Version, Issue 48 (Augmented 3rd ed.). Oxford University Press. ISBN 978-0195288810.
- Fitzmyer, Joseph A. (2008). A Guide to the Dead Sea Scrolls and Related Literature. Grand Rapids, MI: William B. Eerdmans Publishing Company. ISBN 9780802862419.
- Halley, Henry H. (1965). Halley's Bible Handbook: an abbreviated Bible commentary (24th (revised) ed.). Zondervan Publishing House. ISBN 0-310-25720-4.
- Hayes, Christine (2015). Introduction to the Bible. Yale University Press. ISBN 978-0300188271.
- Jones, Gwilym H. (2007). "12. 1 and 2 Samuel". In Barton, John; Muddiman, John (eds.). The Oxford Bible Commentary (first (paperback) ed.). Oxford University Press. pp. 196–232. ISBN 978-0199277186.
- Klein, R.W. (2003). "Samuel, books of". In Bromiley, Geoffrey W (ed.). The International Standard Bible Encyclopedia. Eerdmans. ISBN 9780802837844.
- Knight, Douglas A (1995). "Chapter 4 Deuteronomy and the Deuteronomists". In James Luther Mays, David L. Petersen and Kent Harold Richards (ed.). Old Testament Interpretation. T&T Clark. ISBN 9780567292896.
- McKane, William (1993). "Samuel, Book of". In Metzger, Bruce M; Coogan, Michael D (eds.). The Oxford Companion to the Bible. Oxford University Press. pp. 409–413. ISBN 978-0195046458.
- Ulrich, Eugene, ed. (2010). The Biblical Qumran Scrolls: Transcriptions and Textual Variants. Brill.
- Würthwein, Ernst (1995). The Text of the Old Testament. Translated by Rhodes, Erroll F. Grand Rapids, MI: Wm. B. Eerdmans. ISBN 0-8028-0788-7.
