= 2 Samuel 15 =

Second Book of Samuel chapter

- ← chapter 14 chapter 16 →
- The pages containing the Books of Samuel (1 & 2 Samuel) Leningrad Codex (1008 CE).
- Book: First book of Samuel
- Hebrew Bible part: Nevi'im
- Order in the Hebrew part: 3
- Category: Former Prophets
- Christian Bible part: Old Testament
- Order in the Christian part: 10

2 Samuel 15 is the fifteenth chapter of the Second Book of Samuel in the Old Testament of the Christian Bible or the second part of Books of Samuel in the Hebrew Bible. According to Jewish tradition the book was attributed to the prophet Samuel, with additions by the prophets Gad and Nathan, but modern scholars view it as a composition of a number of independent texts of various ages from c. 630–540 BCE. This chapter contains the account of David's reign in Jerusalem. This is within a section comprising 2 Samuel 9–20 and continued to 1 Kings 1–2 which deal with the power struggles among David's sons to succeed David's throne until 'the kingdom was established in the hand of Solomon' (1 Kings 2:46).

== Text ==
This chapter was originally written in the Hebrew language. It is divided into 37 verses.

=== Textual witnesses ===
Some early manuscripts containing the text of this chapter in Hebrew are of the Masoretic Text tradition, which includes the Codex Cairensis (895), Aleppo Codex (10th century), and Codex Leningradensis (1008). Fragments containing parts of this chapter in Hebrew were found among the Dead Sea Scrolls including 4Q51 (4QSam^{a}; 100–50 BCE) with extant verses 1–7, 20–21, 23, 26–31, 37 and 4Q53 (4QSam^{c}; 100–75 BCE) with extant verses 1–6, 8–15.

Extant ancient manuscripts of a translation into Koine Greek known as the Septuagint (originally was made in the last few centuries BCE) include Codex Vaticanus (B; $\mathfrak{G}$^{B}; 4th century) and Codex Alexandrinus (A; $\mathfrak{G}$^{A}; 5th century). (Note: The whole book of 2 Samuel is missing from the extant Codex Sinaiticus.)

=== Old Testament references ===
- 2 Samuel 15:30–37: Psalm 63:1–11

== Analysis ==
This chapter consists of two stages of Absalom's plan to take over the throne from David:

1. Absalom's conspiracy (verses 1–12)
2. Absalom's rebellion (verses 13–37, continuing to 2 Samuel 20:3).

The conspiracy part consists of 3 phases:

1. Absalom at the gate of Jerusalem appeasing the people from all tribes of Israel (verses 1–6)
2. Absalom asks permission from David to gp to Hebron (verses 7–9)
3. Absalom in Hebron to start his rebellion (verses 10–12)

The story of Absalom's rebellion can be observed as five consecutive episodes:

A. David's flight from Jerusalem (15:13–16:14)

B. The victorious Absalom and his counselors (16:15–17:14)

C. David reaches Mahanaim (17:15–29)

B'. The rebellion is crushed and Absalom is executed (18:1–19:8abc)

A'. David's reentry into Jerusalem (19:8d–20:3)

God's role seems to be understated in the whole events, but is disclosed by a seemingly insignificant detail: 'the crossing of the Jordan river'. The Hebrew root word' 'br, "to cross" (in various nominal and verbal forms) is used more than 30 times in these chapters (compared to 20 times in the rest of 2 Samuel) to report David's flight from Jerusalem, his crossing of the Jordan river, and his reentry into Jerusalem. In 2 Samuel 17:16, stating that David should cross the Jordan (17:16), the verb 'br is even reinforced by a 'Hebrew infinitive absolute' to mark this critical moment: "king David is about to cross out of the land of Israel." David's future was in doubt until it was stated that God had rendered foolish Ahithophel's good counsel to Absalom (2 Samuel 17:14), thus granting David's prayer (15:31), and saving David from Absalom's further actions. Once Absalom was defeated, David's crossing back over the Jordan echoes the Israelites' first crossing over the Jordan under Joshua's leadership (Joshua 1–4):

1. Both David and Joshua crossed the Jordan and came to Gilgal (Joshua 4:19; 2 Samuel 19:40).
2. Both were assisted by women who hid the good spies to save the mission: Rahab in Joshua 2:1–21 and the woman of Bahurim in 2 Samuel 17:20.
3. Both episodes include the Ark of the Covenant, although David prevented the ark from crossing out of the land of Israel (15:25; referring to areas west of Jordan river).

Here God's role is not as explicit as during Joshua's crossing, but the signs are clear that God was with David, just as with Joshua.

== Absalom’s conspiracy (15:1–12) ==
Absalom's ambition to take the throne was made known when he got for himself a royal retinue, 'chariot and horses', and a personal bodyguard, 'men to run ahead of him' (cf 1 Kings 1:5). In his next step he set out to win popular support among the people from all tribes of Israel who came to the 'seat of justice' ('the gate') for litigation. Absalom was capitalizing on discontent caused by the failure of David's court to act efficiently and sympathetically, and gaining popularity by making himself accessible and friendly (verse 6). For 4 years Absalom planned his revolt without arousing any suspicion. As Absalom was born in Hebron (thus a Hebronite), his request for permission to fulfil a vow in Hebron was readily granted. He chose Hebron as the seat of kingship (verse 10) to show that he was supported by the Judahites (including Amasa, David's nephew, and Ahitophel, David's counsellor and grandfather of Bathsheba), while also enjoying support from northern tribes, therefore from Dan to Beersheba (cf. 17:11).

== David fled from Jerusalem (15:13–37) ==
David's flight from Jerusalem toward the eastside of the Jordan River was evidently a wise move, as he could not seek refuge in Judah nor other areas west of Jordan due to Absalom's presence in Hebron, the discontent among the Israelites and the enmity of the Philistines. On the outskirts of Jerusalem, probably on the edge of the Kidron Valley before the ascent to the Mount of Olives, David stood to watch his supporters marched past him, including the Jerusalem garrison ('his servants'), loyal troops ('the people'), his personal bodyguard ('the Cherethites and Pelethites', cf. 2 Samuel 8:18) and a detachment of 600 Philistines from Gath under Ittai (verses 17–18). During David's flight from Jerusalem there were five conversations with various people (15:19–16:13), bearing some symmetrical correspondence to the three encounters with some of the same people on his homeward journey (19:16–40).

In the first meeting, David tried to persuade Ittai (verses 19–23), the leader of the Gittites (people of Gath), to stay with Absalom ('the king') and avoid the uncertainty as a foreigner and exile with Davis, but for Ittai David was his only king with whom he was determined to stay.

In the second conversation David gives the two priests, Abiathar and Zadok (verses 24–29), two reasons for returning to Jerusalem:

1. theological: David resigned to the will of YHWH who decides the outcome.
2. practical: David was planting the priests in Jerusalem to obtain information (verse 28).

David's advance up the Mount of Olives (verses 30–31), described as a pilgrimage or an act of penance, breaks the sequence of the five conversations. This was a march in sorrow and humility, containing a prayer that Ahithophel's counsel be confounded (verse 31). A third conversation soon occurred between David and Hushai of the Archite clan of Benjamin (verse 32–37), whose appearance in the place 'where God was worshipped' could be a direct reply to David's prayer, for Husai was commissioned to be an informer and to defeat Ahithophel's counsel. Hushai, with the two priests and their sons (Ahimaaz and Jonathan), was to infiltrate Absalom's inner circle and report back to David.

=== Verse 31 ===
And it was told David, "Ahithophel is among the conspirators with Absalom." And David said, "O LORD, please turn the counsel of Ahithophel into foolishness."

- "Turn the counsel of Ahithophel": David did not pray against Ahithophel's person, but against his counsel, believing that God has control of all hearts and tongues in his hand. The prayer was granted as noted in 2 Samuel 17:14.

== See also ==
- Ahithophel the Gilonite
- Ark of the Covenant
- Chariot
- City Gate
- Concubine
- Gittites
- Geshur, Syria
- Gilo
- Horses in warfare
- Jerusalem
- Kingdom of Israel
- Levites
- Related Bible parts: 2 Samuel 13, 2 Samuel 14

== Sources ==
=== Commentaries on Samuel ===
- Auld, Graeme (2003). "1 & 2 Samuel". In James D. G. Dunn and John William Rogerson (ed.). Eerdmans Commentary on the Bible. Eerdmans. ISBN 9780802837110.
- Bergen, David T. (1996). 1, 2 Samuel. B&H Publishing Group. ISBN 9780805401073.
- Chapman, Stephen B. (2016). 1 Samuel as Christian Scripture: A Theological Commentary. Wm. B. Eerdmans Publishing Company. ISBN 978-1467445160.
- Collins, John J. (2014). "Chapter 14: 1 Samuel 12 – 2 Samuel 25". Introduction to the Hebrew Scriptures. Fortress Press. pp. 277–296. ISBN 978-1451469233.
- Evans, Paul (2018). Longman, Tremper (ed.). 1-2 Samuel. The Story of God Bible Commentary. Zondervan Academic. ISBN 978-0310490944.
- Gordon, Robert (1986). I & II Samuel, A Commentary. Paternoster Press. ISBN 9780310230229.
- Hertzberg, Hans Wilhelm (1964). I & II Samuel, A Commentary (trans. from German 2nd edition 1960 ed.). Westminster John Knox Press. p. 19. ISBN 978-0664223182.
- Morrison, Craig E. (2013). Berit Olam: 2 Samuel. Liturgical Press. ISBN 978-0814682913.
- Steinmann, Andrew (2017). 2 Samuel. Concordia commentary: a theological exposition of sacred scripture. Concordia Publishing House. ISBN 9780758650061.

=== General ===
- Breytenbach, Andries (2000). "Who Is Behind The Samuel Narrative?". In Johannes Cornelis de Moor and H.F. Van Rooy (ed.). Past, Present, Future: the Deuteronomistic History and the Prophets. Brill. ISBN 9789004118713.
- Coogan, Michael David (2007). Coogan, Michael David; Brettler, Marc Zvi; Newsom, Carol Ann; Perkins, Pheme (eds.). The New Oxford Annotated Bible with the Apocryphal/Deuterocanonical Books: New Revised Standard Version, Issue 48 (Augmented 3rd ed.). Oxford University Press. ISBN 978-0195288810.
- Fitzmyer, Joseph A. (2008). A Guide to the Dead Sea Scrolls and Related Literature. Grand Rapids, MI: William B. Eerdmans Publishing Company. ISBN 9780802862419.
- Halley, Henry H. (1965). Halley's Bible Handbook: an abbreviated Bible commentary (24th (revised) ed.). Zondervan Publishing House. ISBN 0-310-25720-4.
- Hayes, Christine (2015). Introduction to the Bible. Yale University Press. ISBN 978-0300188271.
- Jones, Gwilym H. (2007). "12. 1 and 2 Samuel". In Barton, John; Muddiman, John (eds.). The Oxford Bible Commentary (first (paperback) ed.). Oxford University Press. pp. 196–232. ISBN 978-0199277186.
- Klein, R.W. (2003). "Samuel, books of". In Bromiley, Geoffrey W (ed.). The International Standard Bible Encyclopedia. Eerdmans. ISBN 9780802837844.
- Knight, Douglas A (1995). "Chapter 4 Deuteronomy and the Deuteronomists". In James Luther Mays, David L. Petersen and Kent Harold Richards (ed.). Old Testament Interpretation. T&T Clark. ISBN 9780567292896.
- McKane, William (1993). "Samuel, Book of". In Metzger, Bruce M; Coogan, Michael D (eds.). The Oxford Companion to the Bible. Oxford University Press. pp. 409–413. ISBN 978-0195046458.
- Ulrich, Eugene, ed. (2010). The Biblical Qumran Scrolls: Transcriptions and Textual Variants. Brill.
- Würthwein, Ernst (1995). The Text of the Old Testament. Translated by Rhodes, Erroll F. Grand Rapids, MI: Wm. B. Eerdmans. ISBN 0-8028-0788-7.
