= Machir (disambiguation) =

Machir or Makir (Hebrew: מָכִיר Māḵîr, "bartered") was the name of two figures in the Hebrew Bible.

Machir may also refer to:

- Machir (tribe)
- Makhir of Narbonne (725-765 c.e.), Babylonian-Jewish scholar and leader of the Jewish community of Narbonne
- Machir ben Abba Mari, author of Yalkut haMachiri (Hebrew: ילקוט המכירי)
- James Machir (1764–1827), United States Representative from Virginia
