= Machair (disambiguation) =

Machair is a Scottish Gaelic word referring to the fertile grassland near the shore, particularly prevalent in the Outer Hebrides.

Machair may also refer to:

- Machair (TV series), a Scottish Gaelic TV series that ran from 1992 to 1998

== See also ==
- Machir (disambiguation)
