= Archi (Old Testament) =

Old Testament city

Archi was an Old Testament city on the boundary of Ephraim and Benjamin (Joshua 16:2), between Bethel and Beth-horon the nether. Hushai, mentioned in 2 Samuel 15:32–37, is described as being an Archite.
