= Ammihud =

Ammihud (Hebrew: עַמִּיהוּד ‘Ammîhūḏ, "people of glory" or "renowned") is the name of several Hebrew Bible figures:

- The father of the Ephraimite chief Elishama, the father of Nun, at the time of the Exodus (Book of Numbers 1:10; 2:18; 7:48,53).
- The father of Shemuel, of the Tribe of Simeon (Numbers 34:20)
- The father of Pedahel, a prince of the Tribe of Naphtali (Numbers 34:28)
- The father of Talmai, king of Geshur, to whom Absalom fled after the murder of Amnon (2 Samuel 13:37)
- The son of Omri, and the father of Uthai (1 Chronicles 9:4)
