= Ammiel =

The name Ammiel (Hebrew: עַמִּיאֵל ‘Ammī’ēl) may refer to several people in the Hebrew Bible. Etymologically, it means "people of God", and is used for the following individuals:

- Ammiel, son of Gemalli, one of the twelve spies sent by Moses to search the land of Canaan (Numbers 13:12). He was one of the ten who perished by the plague for their unfavourable report (Numbers 14:37).
- The father of Machir of Lo-debar, in whose house Mephibosheth the son of Jonathan resided (2 Samuel 9:4, 5; 17:27).
- The father of Bathsheba, the wife of Uriah, and afterwards of David (1 Chronicles 3:5). He is called Eliam in 2 Samuel 11:3.
- One of the sons of Obed-edom the Levite (1 Chronicles 26:5).

== Notable examples ==
- Ammiel Alcalay (born 1956), American poet
- Ammiel Bushakevitz (born 1986), Israeli-South African pianist
- Ammiel Hirsch (born 1959), Reform Jewish rabbi
- Ammiel J. Willard (1822-1900), chief justice on the South Carolina Supreme Court

In Yiddish pronunciation, the Hebrew theophoric name Ammiel is read and pronounced as Emmiel or Emil (Yiddish: עַמִּיאֵל - Emil).
