= 2 Samuel 14 =

Second Book of Samuel chapter

- ← chapter 13 chapter 15 →
- The pages containing the Books of Samuel (1 & 2 Samuel) Leningrad Codex (1008 CE).
- Book: First book of Samuel
- Hebrew Bible part: Nevi'im
- Order in the Hebrew part: 3
- Category: Former Prophets
- Christian Bible part: Old Testament
- Order in the Christian part: 10

2 Samuel 14 is the fourteenth chapter of the Second Book of Samuel in the Old Testament of the Christian Bible or the second part of Books of Samuel in the Hebrew Bible. According to Jewish tradition the book was attributed to the prophet Samuel, with additions by the prophets Gad and Nathan, but modern scholars view it as a composition of a number of independent texts of various ages from c. 630–540 BCE. This chapter contains the account of David's reign in Jerusalem. This is within a section comprising 2 Samuel 9–20 and continued to 1 Kings 1–2 which deal with the power struggles among David's sons to succeed David's throne until 'the kingdom was established in the hand of Solomon' (1 Kings 2:46).

== Text ==
This chapter was originally written in the Hebrew language. It is divided into 33 verses.

=== Textual witnesses ===
Some early manuscripts containing the text of this chapter in Hebrew are of the Masoretic Text tradition, which includes the Codex Cairensis (895), Aleppo Codex (10th century), and Codex Leningradensis (1008). Fragments containing parts of this chapter in Hebrew were found among the Dead Sea Scrolls including 4Q51 (4QSam^{a}; 100–50 BCE) with extant verses 1–3, 14, 18–19, 33; 15 and 4Q53 (4QSam^{c}; 100–75 BCE) with extant verses 7–33.

Extant ancient manuscripts of a translation into Koine Greek known as the Septuagint (originally was made in the last few centuries BCE) include Codex Vaticanus (B; $\mathfrak{G}$^{B}; 4th century) and Codex Alexandrinus (A; $\mathfrak{G}$^{A}; 5th century). (Note: The whole book of 2 Samuel is missing from the extant Codex Sinaiticus.)

== Analysis ==
This chapter contains the following structure:

A. Joab's plan: he sends the wise woman to the king, putting words in her mouth (14:1–3)

B. The woman manipulates king David to reconsider Absalom's exile (14:4–17)

C. The king recognizes Joab's role and changes his mind on Absalom's exile (14:18–20)

B'. The king executes his decision on Absalom's exile (14:21–28)

Interruption: an introduction to Absalom (14:25–27)

A'. Absalom's plan: he sends Joab to the king, putting words in his mouth (14:29–33)

At the opening, Joab who noticed David's softened heart toward Absalom, devised a plan to bring Absalom back to Jerusalem (A) and at the end, Absalom devised a plan to see David and was reconciled with his father (A'). The climax of these events is when king David detected Joab's plan (C).

== Absalom returned to Jerusalem (14:1–27) ==
Joab read signs that David was ready for Absalom's return, so Joab used trickery to get David's permission so he could bring Absalom, a possible heir to the throne, back to the king's court. For executing his plan, Joab channeled his plea to David through the mouth of a wise woman from Tekoah who had the special gift of either a gift of speech or a gift for feigning or acting lamentation.

There are possible connections between this episode and other biblical passages:

1. The style resembles Nathan's parable (2 Samuel 12), after which David condemned himself in his response to the described injustice. Here David convicted himself in his judgement (verse 13).
2. The tale about two brothers where one killing the other is reminiscent of Cain and Abel in Genesis 4, especially the protection given to the murderer by divine promise (Genesis 4:15) and here by royal oath (verse 11).
3. The account of Joab's interaction with the wise woman of Tekoa contains several links to his conversation with the wise women of Abel of Beth-maacah in 2 Samuel 20.

The woman presented to David a dilemma: she was a widow with only two sons, that when one murdered the other, she was torn between her duty to avenge the death of one son and her duty to her husband to preserve his name by protecting the life of the remaining son (verse 7). Her community demanded a blood revenge, but her appeal for special consideration so that 'her last ember would not be quenched' touched king David's heart, so he promised a ruling (verse 8), which became a royal oath on the woman's further insistence that no one would touch her son. The oath placed David in jeopardy because he had condemned himself for his treatment of Absalom as the woman argued (verse 14): all would die, and Amnon's death cannot be changed by keeping Absalom in banishment.

The parallel of the parable devised by Joab to be spoken by the woman to the story of Cain and Abel can be summarized below:

	Cain and Abel	Joab's Parable
Two brothers were alone together in the countryside	Genesis 4:8	2 Samuel 14:6
One killed the other	Genesis 4:8	2 Samuel 14:6
Someone in authority needed to intervene to protect the murderer from vengeance	Genesis 4:13-15	2 Samuel 14:7-8
There was a threat of retaliation if someone should kill the murderer	Genesis 4:15	2 Samuel 14:10

Apparently Joab crafted the tale assuming that David had a masterful knowledge of the Torah, and that David would use it as an authoritative guide in making his legal decisions (cf. Nathan's parable; 2 Samuel 12:6), so the king would give the same verdict that the Lord issued for Cain.

At this time, David realized that the woman's action was actually Joab's doing, still he acceded to the request that Absalom be allowed to return, although not be granted full privileges (verse 24). The section comprising verses 25–27 provides specific descriptions on Absalom — his beauty and in particular to the weight of his hair— as well as his children, probably intended to show the popularity of Absalom among the people of Israel.

=== Verse 27 ===
And to Absalom there were born three sons, and one daughter whose name was Tamar; she was a woman of beautiful appearance.

- "Three sons": Their names are not given, indicating that they may have died in infancy, as supported by 2 Samuel 18:18, where Absalom said, "I have no son to keep my name in remembrance."
- "Tamar": Absalom's daughter named after her aunt, who was also said to be beautiful. The Septuagint version has an addition that "she became the wife of Rehoboam, and mother of Abijah." However, 1 Kings 15:2 records that Abijah's mother was "Maachah the daughter of Abishalom;" and in 2 Chronicles 13:2 her name was "Michaiah the daughter of Uriel of Gibeah" ("Michaiah" is considered a variation of "Maachah"), so it could be deducted that Tamar married Uriel, and that it was her daughter (which is, the granddaughter of Absalom; in Hebrew custom can be called "Absalom's daughter") who became Rehoboam's favorite queen (cf. 2 Chronicles 11:20, 21).

== Absalom reconciled to David (14:28–33) ==
After waiting for two years without any signs of progress in his relationship with his father, Absalom took one desperate action against Joab, by burning Joab's field, to get Joab's attention and compelled Joab to bring Absalom to David. Finally Absalom met David and given a kiss (verse 33) as a sign of reconciliation.

=== Verse 33 ===
So Joab came to the king, and told him: and when he had called for Absalom, he came to the king, and bowed himself on his face to the ground before the king: and the king kissed Absalom.

- "The king kissed Absalom": this indicates a reconciliation and the restoration of Absalom's place as David's son with all its privileges. The kiss here has a similar token as the father's kiss in the case of the prodigal son (Luke 15:20).

== See also ==
- Angel
- Jerusalem
- Kingdom of Israel
- Mashal
- Murder
- Shekel
- Tekoah
- Zeruiah
- Related Bible parts: Genesis 4, 2 Samuel 12, 2 Samuel 13

== Sources ==
=== Commentaries on Samuel ===
- Auld, Graeme (2003). "1 & 2 Samuel". In James D. G. Dunn and John William Rogerson (ed.). Eerdmans Commentary on the Bible. Eerdmans. ISBN 9780802837110.
- Bergen, David T. (1996). 1, 2 Samuel. B&H Publishing Group. ISBN 9780805401073.
- Chapman, Stephen B. (2016). 1 Samuel as Christian Scripture: A Theological Commentary. Wm. B. Eerdmans Publishing Company. ISBN 978-1467445160.
- Collins, John J. (2014). "Chapter 14: 1 Samuel 12 – 2 Samuel 25". Introduction to the Hebrew Scriptures. Fortress Press. pp. 277–296. ISBN 978-1451469233.
- Evans, Paul (2018). Longman, Tremper (ed.). 1-2 Samuel. The Story of God Bible Commentary. Zondervan Academic. ISBN 978-0310490944.
- Gordon, Robert (1986). I & II Samuel, A Commentary. Paternoster Press. ISBN 9780310230229.
- Hertzberg, Hans Wilhelm (1964). I & II Samuel, A Commentary (trans. from German 2nd edition 1960 ed.). Westminster John Knox Press. p. 19. ISBN 978-0664223182.
- Morrison, Craig E. (2013). Berit Olam: 2 Samuel. Liturgical Press. ISBN 978-0814682913.
- Steinmann, Andrew (2017). 2 Samuel. Concordia commentary: a theological exposition of sacred scripture. Concordia Publishing House. ISBN 9780758650061.

=== General ===
- Breytenbach, Andries (2000). "Who Is Behind The Samuel Narrative?". In Johannes Cornelis de Moor and H.F. Van Rooy (ed.). Past, Present, Future: the Deuteronomistic History and the Prophets. Brill. ISBN 9789004118713.
- Coogan, Michael David (2007). Coogan, Michael David; Brettler, Marc Zvi; Newsom, Carol Ann; Perkins, Pheme (eds.). The New Oxford Annotated Bible with the Apocryphal/Deuterocanonical Books: New Revised Standard Version, Issue 48 (Augmented 3rd ed.). Oxford University Press. ISBN 978-0195288810.
- Fitzmyer, Joseph A. (2008). A Guide to the Dead Sea Scrolls and Related Literature. Grand Rapids, MI: William B. Eerdmans Publishing Company. ISBN 9780802862419.
- Halley, Henry H. (1965). Halley's Bible Handbook: an abbreviated Bible commentary (24th (revised) ed.). Zondervan Publishing House. ISBN 0-310-25720-4.
- Hayes, Christine (2015). Introduction to the Bible. Yale University Press. ISBN 978-0300188271.
- Jones, Gwilym H. (2007). "12. 1 and 2 Samuel". In Barton, John; Muddiman, John (eds.). The Oxford Bible Commentary (first (paperback) ed.). Oxford University Press. pp. 196–232. ISBN 978-0199277186.
- Klein, R.W. (2003). "Samuel, books of". In Bromiley, Geoffrey W (ed.). The International Standard Bible Encyclopedia. Eerdmans. ISBN 9780802837844.
- Knight, Douglas A (1995). "Chapter 4 Deuteronomy and the Deuteronomists". In James Luther Mays, David L. Petersen and Kent Harold Richards (ed.). Old Testament Interpretation. T&T Clark. ISBN 9780567292896.
- McKane, William (1993). "Samuel, Book of". In Metzger, Bruce M; Coogan, Michael D (eds.). The Oxford Companion to the Bible. Oxford University Press. pp. 409–413. ISBN 978-0195046458.
- Ulrich, Eugene, ed. (2010). The Biblical Qumran Scrolls: Transcriptions and Textual Variants. Brill.
- Würthwein, Ernst (1995). The Text of the Old Testament. Translated by Rhodes, Erroll F. Grand Rapids, MI: Wm. B. Eerdmans. ISBN 0-8028-0788-7.
