= 2 Samuel 12 =

Second Book of Samuel chapter

- ← chapter 11 chapter 13 →
- The pages containing the Books of Samuel (1 & 2 Samuel) Leningrad Codex (1008 CE).
- Book: First book of Samuel
- Hebrew Bible part: Nevi'im
- Order in the Hebrew part: 3
- Category: Former Prophets
- Christian Bible part: Old Testament
- Order in the Christian part: 10

2 Samuel 12 is the twelfth chapter of the Second Book of Samuel in the Old Testament of the Christian Bible or the second part of Books of Samuel in the Hebrew Bible. According to Jewish tradition the book was attributed to the prophet Samuel, with additions by the prophets Gad and Nathan, but modern scholars view it as a composition of a number of independent texts of various ages from c. 630–540 BCE. This chapter contains the account of David's reign in Jerusalem. This is within a section comprising 2 Samuel 9–20 and continued to 1 Kings 1–2 which deal with the power struggles among David's sons to succeed David's throne until 'the kingdom was established in the hand of Solomon' (1 Kings 2:46).

== Text ==
This chapter was originally written in the Hebrew language. It is divided into 31 verses.

=== Textual witnesses ===
Some early manuscripts containing the text of this chapter in Hebrew are of the Masoretic Text tradition, which includes the Codex Cairensis (895), Aleppo Codex (10th century), and Codex Leningradensis (1008). Fragments containing parts of this chapter in Hebrew were found among the Dead Sea Scrolls including 4Q51 (4QSam^{a}; 100–50 BCE) with extant verses 1, 3–5, 8–9, 13–20, 29–31.

Extant ancient manuscripts of a translation into Koine Greek known as the Septuagint (originally was made in the last few centuries BCE) include Codex Vaticanus (B; $\mathfrak{G}$^{B}; 4th century) and Codex Alexandrinus (A; $\mathfrak{G}$^{A}; 5th century). (Note: The whole book of 2 Samuel is missing from the extant Codex Sinaiticus.)

=== Old Testament references ===
- 2 Samuel 12:1–11: Psalm 51:1–19
- 2 Samuel 12:26–31: 1 Chronicles 20:1–3

== Analysis ==
Chapters 11 and 12, which pertain to David, Bathsheba, and Uriah, form one episode that is concentrically structured in eleven scenes:

A. David sends Joab and the army to attack Rabbah (11:1)

B. David sleeps with Bathsheba, the wife of Uriah (11:2–5)

C. David and Uriah: David arranges Uriah's death (11:6–13)

D. David to Joab: Uriah must die (11:14–17)

E. Joab to David: Joab's news comes to David (11:18–25)

F. David ushers the wife of Uriah into his house. The Lord is displeased (11:26–27)

E'. Nathan to David: God's news comes to David (12:1–7a)

D'. Nathan to David: the child will die (12:7b–15a)

C'. David and the child: God ensures the child's death (12:15b–23)

B'. David sleeps with Bathsheba, his wife (12:24–25)

A'. Joab and David conquer Rabbah (12:26–31)

The whole episode is framed by the battle against Rabbah, the Ammonite capital, beginning with David dispatching Joab and the army to besiege the city, then concluding by the capitulation of the city to David (A/A'). Both B/B' scenes recount that David slept with Bathsheba, who conceived each time. Scenes C and D recount the plot that got Uriah killed, whereas C' and D' report God's response to David's crime: the child would die. The E/E' sections contrast David's reaction to the death of Uriah to his reaction to the slaughter of a ewe lamb in Nathan's parable. The turning point in the episode (F) states the divine displeasure to these events.

This episode of David's disgrace has a profound effect in the later memory of David's fidelity to the Lord: "David did what was right in the sight of the LORD, and did not turn aside from anything that he commanded him all the days of his life, except in the matter of Uriah the Hittite” (1 Kings 15:5), while it is skipped it completely in the Books of Chronicles (see 1 Chronicles 20:1–2).

== Nathan rebukes David (12:1–15) ==
The last statement in the previous chapter shows that David's actions towards Bathsheba and Uriah was unacceptable to God (2 Samuel 11:27b). Nathan, the court prophet and counsellor, used a parable (12:1–7a) to reveal David's guilt and the deserved punishment which David himself had pronounced on the rich man in the parable. Parallelisms between the theft of a ewe lamb and the theft of Uriah's wife as well as the surrounding and subsequent events can be observed in the use of specific Hebrew words as summarized in the table below:

Hebrew words	Nathan's parable	Reflection in the surrounding narrative
שָׁכַב, shakab; verb: "lie (down); lay"	The ewe lamb would "lie" in her master's bosom (12:3)	1. David "lay" with Bathsheba (11:4); 2. Uriah did not "lie" with his wife, but "lay" in the place of his master's servants (11:9, 11, 13); 3. Someone would "lie" with David's wives (12:11)
חֵיק, kheq; noun: "bosom", "arms" or "laps"	The ewe lamb would lie in her master's "bosom" (12:3)	God gave Saul's wives into David's "bosom" (12:8)
בַּת, bath; noun: "daughter"	The ewe lamb was like a "daughter" to the poor man (12:3)	"Bathsheba" (the "ewe" in parable") means "daughter of Sheba" (12:8); she was the "daughter" of Eliam (11:3)
חָמַל, khamal; phrase: "thought it a pity", "to spare"	The rich man "thought it a pity" to take one of his sheep (12:4)	David condemned the rich man because "he had no pity" (12:8; negation of the phrase)
לָקַח, laqakh; verb: "take"	The rich man "took" the poor man's ewe lamb (12:4)	1. David "took" Uriah's wife (12:9, 10); 2. YHWH "will take" David's wives (12:11)
עָשָׂה, asah; verb: "prepare", "do", "make", "act"	The rich man "prepared" the lamb for his visitor (12:4)	1. David twice refers to the man who "did" this (12:5, 6); 2. David despised YHWH's Word "to do" evil (12:9a); 3. David "acted" in secret, but God will "do" this (that is, take David's wives) in public (twice in 12:12)

Nathan's parable elicited words of condemnation from David, which immediately were thrown back at him with the simple application 'You are the man' (verse 7a), followed by the pronouncement of the king's verdict from YHWH; this is the focal point of the section. Verses 7b–10 and 11–12 are two distinctive units, each with its own beginning and a prophetic-messenger formula, deal with different aspects of David's crime and consequent judgement. The first unit (verses 7b–10) deals with the murder of Uriah, more than with the taking of Bathsheba, with the main accusation that David had 'struck down Uriah the Hittite with the sword'. After YHWH did mighty works on behalf of David which could be more (verses 7b–8), David's action to Uriah had despised YHWH (verse 9), so the punishment to this crime is that 'the sword shall never depart from your house'. The second unit (verses 11–12) pronounces a punishment that fits the crime of adultery: that a member of his household would over David's harem, and that this would be a public act of humiliation in contrast to what David did secretly. David's responded with a brief admission of guilt (verse 13), understanding that he had deserved death. Nathan replied that David's repentance had been accepted by YHWH, that David's sin was forgiven, and the sentence of death on David was personally commuted, but the child born from his adultery with Bathsheba had to die (verse 14).

=== Verse 7 ===
Then Nathan said to David, “You are the man!
Thus says the Lord God of Israel: 'I anointed you king over Israel, and I delivered you from the hand of Saul.'

- "You are the man": from Hebrew אתה האיש, ’at-tāh hā-’îš. The wording is unique in the Hebrew Bible (cf. the questions with the interrogative he, האתה האיש ha-at-tah ha-is, in Judges 13:11 also in 1 Kings 13:14).

== David’s loss and repentance (12:16–23) ==
Nathan's prophecy in verse 14 is fulfilled in verses 15b–23, as the child of David and Bathsheba became ill, causing David to act unconventionally: he performed fast and vigil, the traditional signs of mourning, during the sickness of the child (verse 16), but abandoned them instantly after the child had died (verse 20). David's behavior perplexed his courtiers, but understandable in conjunction with the theme of sin and forgiveness in verses 13-14: before the child's death, he was pleading 'with God for the child' (verse 16) as the only reasonable course to take (verse 22), but when the child died, David knew that his plea had not been accepted, so it was reasonable to abandon his actions (verse 23). David resigned to these events with serenity, witnessing how God was fulfilling his word, and by implication David had received forgiveness.

== Solomon’s birth (12:24–25) ==
Solomon's birth was noted briefly in verses 24–25, in connection to the death of Bathsheba and David's firstborn, as the name "Solomon" (Hebrew: selomoh) could also be rendered as 'his replacement' (selomoh). The birth record could also be inserted to avoid the identification of Solomon as David's illegitimate son. Nathan the prophet gave him another name, "Jedidiah", meaning 'Beloved of the LORD'.

== The capture of Rabbah (12:26–31) ==
This section returns the narrative to the siege of Rabbah, mentioned in 2 Samuel 11:1. At this time Joab managed to capture 'the royal citadel', a fortified area of Rabbah, so he was in control of the city's water supply (verse 27). David was then invited to lead the final charge of the army, so that the city could be reckoned as his conquest. David dismantled the city's fortifications and took many spoils from the Ammonites, especially the gold crown taken directly from the head of 'their king'; in Hebrew the phrase 'their king' (malkam) also can be read as the name of the Ammonite national god, "Milkom".

== See also ==
- Blasphemy
- Children of Ammon
- Fasting
- Jerusalem
- Kingdom of Israel
- Saul
- Talent (measurement)
- Tribe of Judah
- Related Bible parts: 2 Samuel 11, 1 Chronicles 20, Psalm 51

== Sources ==
=== Commentaries on Samuel ===
- Auld, Graeme (2003). "1 & 2 Samuel". In James D. G. Dunn and John William Rogerson (ed.). Eerdmans Commentary on the Bible. Eerdmans. ISBN 9780802837110.
- Bergen, David T. (1996). 1, 2 Samuel. B&H Publishing Group. ISBN 9780805401073.
- Chapman, Stephen B. (2016). 1 Samuel as Christian Scripture: A Theological Commentary. Wm. B. Eerdmans Publishing Company. ISBN 978-1467445160.
- Collins, John J. (2014). "Chapter 14: 1 Samuel 12 – 2 Samuel 25". Introduction to the Hebrew Scriptures. Fortress Press. pp. 277–296. ISBN 978-1451469233.
- Evans, Paul (2018). Longman, Tremper (ed.). 1-2 Samuel. The Story of God Bible Commentary. Zondervan Academic. ISBN 978-0310490944.
- Gordon, Robert (1986). I & II Samuel, A Commentary. Paternoster Press. ISBN 9780310230229.
- Hertzberg, Hans Wilhelm (1964). I & II Samuel, A Commentary (trans. from German 2nd edition 1960 ed.). Westminster John Knox Press. p. 19. ISBN 978-0664223182.
- Morrison, Craig E. (2013). Berit Olam: 2 Samuel. Liturgical Press. ISBN 978-0814682913.
- Steinmann, Andrew (2017). 2 Samuel. Concordia commentary: a theological exposition of sacred scripture. Concordia Publishing House. ISBN 9780758650061.

=== General ===
- Breytenbach, Andries (2000). "Who Is Behind The Samuel Narrative?". In Johannes Cornelis de Moor and H.F. Van Rooy (ed.). Past, Present, Future: the Deuteronomistic History and the Prophets. Brill. ISBN 9789004118713.
- Coogan, Michael David (2007). Coogan, Michael David; Brettler, Marc Zvi; Newsom, Carol Ann; Perkins, Pheme (eds.). The New Oxford Annotated Bible with the Apocryphal/Deuterocanonical Books: New Revised Standard Version, Issue 48 (Augmented 3rd ed.). Oxford University Press. ISBN 978-0195288810.
- Fitzmyer, Joseph A. (2008). A Guide to the Dead Sea Scrolls and Related Literature. Grand Rapids, MI: William B. Eerdmans Publishing Company. ISBN 9780802862419.
- Halley, Henry H. (1965). Halley's Bible Handbook: an abbreviated Bible commentary (24th (revised) ed.). Zondervan Publishing House. ISBN 0-310-25720-4.
- Hayes, Christine (2015). Introduction to the Bible. Yale University Press. ISBN 978-0300188271.
- Jones, Gwilym H. (2007). "12. 1 and 2 Samuel". In Barton, John; Muddiman, John (eds.). The Oxford Bible Commentary (first (paperback) ed.). Oxford University Press. pp. 196–232. ISBN 978-0199277186.
- Klein, R.W. (2003). "Samuel, books of". In Bromiley, Geoffrey W (ed.). The International Standard Bible Encyclopedia. Eerdmans. ISBN 9780802837844.
- Knight, Douglas A (1995). "Chapter 4 Deuteronomy and the Deuteronomists". In James Luther Mays, David L. Petersen and Kent Harold Richards (ed.). Old Testament Interpretation. T&T Clark. ISBN 9780567292896.
- McKane, William (1993). "Samuel, Book of". In Metzger, Bruce M; Coogan, Michael D (eds.). The Oxford Companion to the Bible. Oxford University Press. pp. 409–413. ISBN 978-0195046458.
- Ulrich, Eugene, ed. (2010). The Biblical Qumran Scrolls: Transcriptions and Textual Variants. Brill.
- Würthwein, Ernst (1995). The Text of the Old Testament. Translated by Rhodes, Erroll F. Grand Rapids, MI: Wm. B. Eerdmans. ISBN 0-8028-0788-7.
