= Machir (tribe) =

Machir (Hebrew: מָכִיר Māḵīr) was the name of a tribal group mentioned in the Song of Deborah in Judges 5, where it is praised for fighting alongside five other Israelite tribes: the Tribe of Ephraim, the Tribe of Benjamin, the Tribe of Zebulun, the Tribe of Issachar, and the Tribe of Naphtali. The Song of Deborah speaks of officers (mechokekim) coming from Machir to join the battle against Sisera.

== Analysis ==
The passage appears to reflect an early time in the history of Israel, before Israel was organized as a nation, when it was instead a group of loosely associated tribes. In the later standardized lists of the Twelve Tribes of Israel, Machir does not appear, but rather the Tribe of Manasseh appears in its place. Machir "may have been an independent clan that was eventually absorbed within Manasseh." Other hypotheses include the idea that Manasseh was originally a clan within Machir which became more prominent than the rest of the tribe, or that Manasseh may have been another group who displaced the Machirites.

According to traditions in the Pentateuch, which view the tribes as descending from the sons of Jacob, Machir was the son of Manasseh, but was legally adopted by Jacob. This places the origins of the "Machirite group" in Egypt. After the time in Egypt, the Bible records that Moses gave the region of Gilead to Machir as part of the eastern half of the inheritance of Manasseh (Deuteronomy 3).

The region is understood in tradition to be identical to the portion of the land of Gilead given to Machir the son of Manasseh by Moses (Numbers 32:40, Deuteronomy 3:15).
