= Ahimaaz =

Son of the high priest Zadok

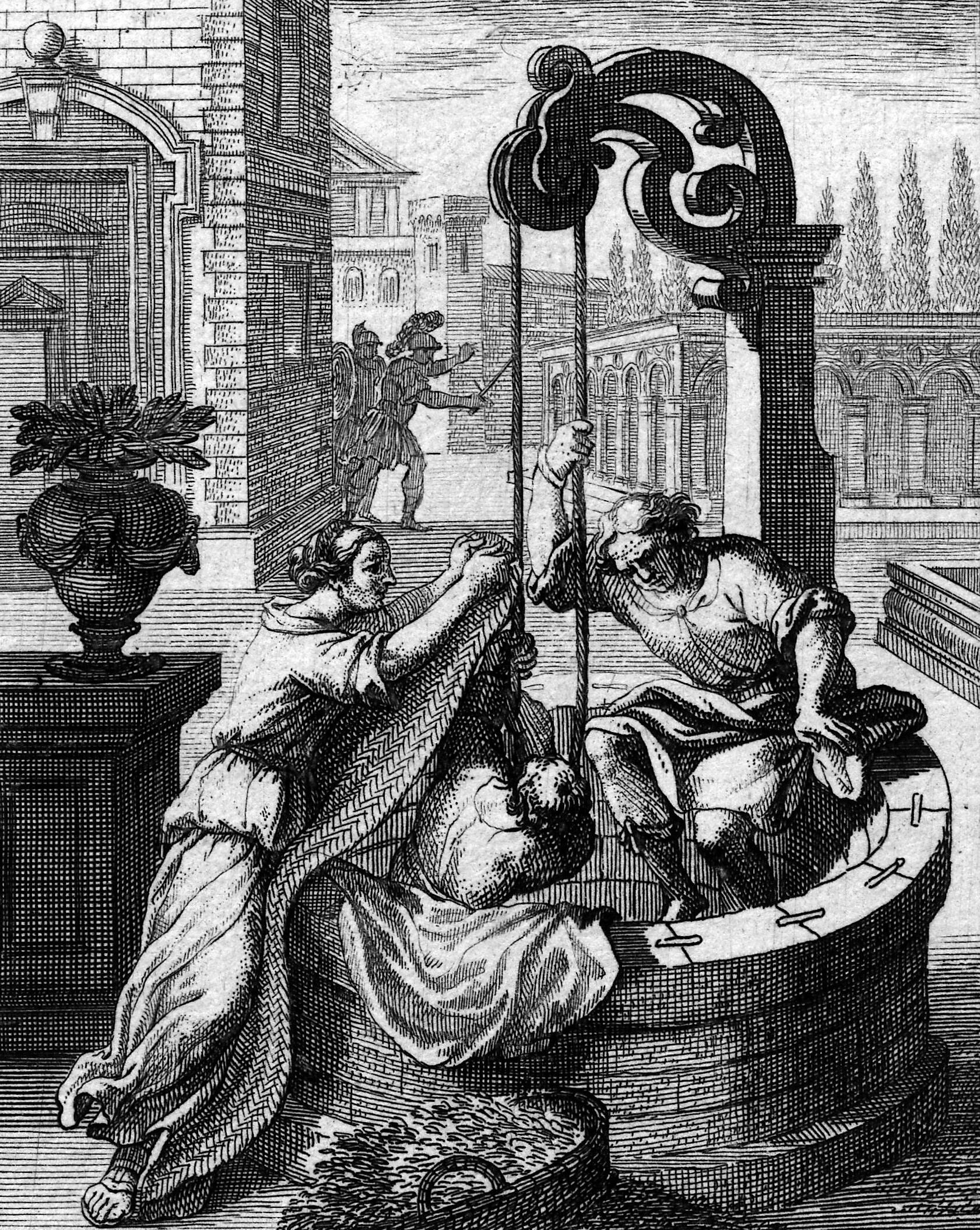
Jonathan and Ahimaaz hide from Absalom by Johann Christoph Weigel, 1695. This woodcut depicts an event recorded in 2 Samuel 17:17-21.

Ahimaaz (Hebrew: אֲחִימַעַץ ʾĂḥīmaʿaṣ, "My Brother Is Counselor") was son of the high priest Zadok.

Ahimaaz first appears in the reign of King David (reigned c. 1000-962 BCE). During Absalom's revolt he remained faithful to David, and, along with Jonathan, son of Abiathar, assisted him by giving him news about the proceedings of Absalom in Jerusalem (2 Samuel 15:24–37; 17:15–21). He was a swift runner, and was the first to bring David news of the defeat of Absalom, although he refrained from mentioning his death (2 Samuel 18:19–33).

Under King Solomon (c. 970–930 BCE), Ahimaaz's father Zadok became high priest. When Zadok died, Ahimaaz succeeded him in that position (1 Chronicles 6:8, 53).

He may have been the same Ahimaaz who took as wife Basemath, one of Solomon's daughters (1 Kings 4:15). Subsequent kings of Israel, Ahaz, also married daughters of the high priest.

== Patrilineal ancestry ==
Patrilineal descent
1. Abraham
2. Isaac
3. Jacob
4. Levi
5. Kehath
6. Amram
7. Aaron
8. Eleazar
9. Phinehas
10. Abishua
11. Bukki
12. Uzzi
13. Zerahiah
14. Meraioth
15. Azariah
16. Amariah
17. Ahitub
18. Zadok

Israelite religious titles
Preceded by Zadok	High Priest of Israel	Succeeded by Azariah
