= Machir =

Two figures in the Hebrew Bible

Machir or Makir (Hebrew: מָכִיר Māḵîr, "bartered") was the name of two figures in the Hebrew Bible

1. Machir was the son of Manasseh, grandson of Joseph, and father of Gilead in the Book of Numbers 26:29.
2. According to the Books of Samuel, Machir son of Ammiel was the name of a descendant of Machir ben Manasseh who resided at Lo-debar. The text states that here he looked after Mephibosheth, the son of Jonathan, until David took over his care, and also looked after David himself when David became a fugitive.

== See also ==
- Makhir of Narbonne
- Tribe of Manasseh
- Machir (biblical region)
