= Lo-debar =

Biblical town

Lo-debar (Biblical Hebrew: לֹא דְבָר, לוֹ דְבָר, romanized: lōʾ dǝbār (Note: The לא spelling is found in 2Sam 17:28, while לו is used in 2Sam 9:4-5. According to some, the לא spelling is also found in Amos 6:13. לִדְבִר is found in Josh 13:26.)) was a town in the Old Testament in Gilead not far from Mahanaim, north of the Jabbok river (2 Samuel 9:4–5) in ancient Israel. It is mentioned in the Hebrew Bible as the home of Machir, a contemporary of David. (2 Samuel 9:4,5).

Lo-debar was also considered a slum town in biblical times. Mephibosheth, son of Jonathan was living in Lo-debar at the house of Machir, son of Ammiel, who was possibly a brother to David's wife Bathsheba (see 1 Chronicles 3 verse 5). King David showed loving kindness to Jonathan's son Mephibosheth by bringing him from Lo-debar and having him eat at the King's table regularly. (2 Samuel 9:1-13).

It is usually believed to be the same as Debir in the Tribe of Gad.(Joshua 13:26) The word means "no pasture,"(2 Samuel 17:27) "no word" or "no communication".

Possible locations are:

- Tel Dover (Khirbet ed-Duweir) in the mouth of Yarmouk River. Established as an Iron Age fortified settlement.
- Khirbet Umm ed-Dabar, Jordan Valley.
