= Ahitophel =

Biblical counselor of King David

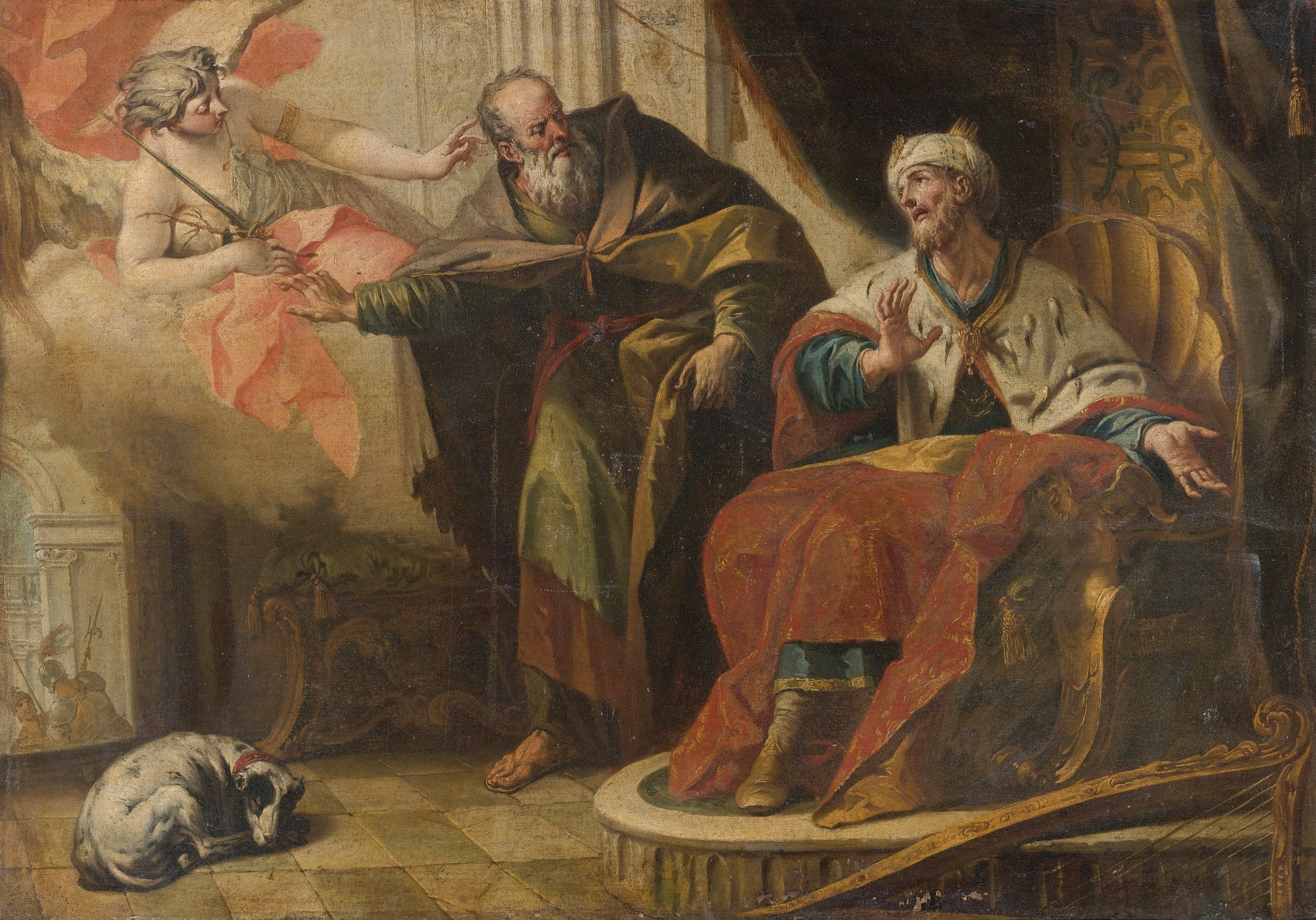
King David And Ahitophel, Gaspare Diziani, date unknown

Ahitophel, Achitofel, or Ahithophel (Hebrew: אֲחִיתֹפֶל, romanized: ʾĂḥīṯōp̄el, lit. 'My Brother is Folly'), according to the Hebrew Bible, was a counselor of King David and a man greatly renowned for his wisdom. During Absalom's attempt to usurp the throne, he deserted David and supported Absalom, whom he then turned to as an advisor. To counteract Ahitophel's counsel, the fleeing David sent his friend Hushai back to Absalom. Seeing that his advice against David had not been followed due to Hushai's influence, Ahithophel surmised that the revolt would fail, returned to his hometown of Giloh, and hanged himself. He was buried in "the sepulcher of his fathers".

A man named Ahitophel is also mentioned in 2 Samuel 23:34, and he is said to be the father of Eliam. Since 2 Samuel 11:3 notes that Eliam is the father of Bathsheba, some scholars suggest that the Ahitophel of 2 Samuel 15 may be Bathsheba's grandfather. Levenson and Baruch Halpern, for example, note that "the narrator is sufficiently subtle (or guileless) to have Bathsheba's grandfather ... instigate the exaction of YHWH's pound of flesh," as Nathan's curse in 2 Samuel 12:11 comes to fruition.

== In Rabbinical literature ==
The Talmud speaks of this counsellor of David as "a man, like Balaam, whose great wisdom was not received in humility as a gift from heaven, and so became a stumbling block to him." He was "one of those who, while casting longing eyes upon things not belonging to them, also lose the things they possess." Accordingly, Ahitophel was granted access by Almighty God into the Divine powers of God. And being thus familiar with Divine wisdom and knowledge as imparted through the Holy Spirit, he was consulted as an oracle like the Urim and Thummim. "..and great as was his wisdom, it was equalled by his scholarship. Therefore, David did not hesitate to submit himself to his instruction, even though Ahitophel was a very young man at his death, not more than thirty-three years old. The one thing lacking in him was sincere piety, which proved his undoing in the end, for it induced him to participate in Absalom's rebellion against David. Thus, he forfeited even his share in the world to come. To this dire course of action, he was misled by astrology and other signs, which he interpreted as prophecies of his kingship when in reality, they pointed to the royal destiny of his granddaughter Bath-sheba. Possessed by his erroneous belief, he cunningly urged Absalom to commit an unheard-of crime. Thus, Absalom would profit nothing by his rebellion, for, though he accomplished his father's ruin, he would yet be held to account and condemned to death for his violation of family purity, and the way to the throne would be clear for Ahitophel, the great sage in Israel." But he withheld his mystic knowledge from King David in the hour of peril and was therefore doomed to die from strangulation. "Ahitophel of the house of Israel and Balaam of the heathen nations were the two great sages of the world who, failing to show gratitude to God for their wisdom, perished in dishonour. To them, the prophetic word finds application: 'Let not the wise man glory in his wisdom' (Jeremiah 9:23)."

It is also said that David, during his reign, had many disagreeable encounters with Ahitophel. Shortly after his accession, the king seems to have overlooked Ahitophel in his appointments with judges and other officials. Consequently, when David was in despair concerning the visitation upon Uzzah during the attempted transport of the ark (2 Samuel 6:6; see Uzzah) and sought counsel of Ahitophel, the latter mockingly suggested to him that he had better apply to his wise men. Only upon David's malediction, that whoever knew a remedy and concealed it should surely end by committing suicide, did Ahitophel offer him some rather vague advice, concealing the true solution, which was that the ark must be carried on the shoulders of men instead of upon a wagon.

=== Curse upon Ahitophel ===
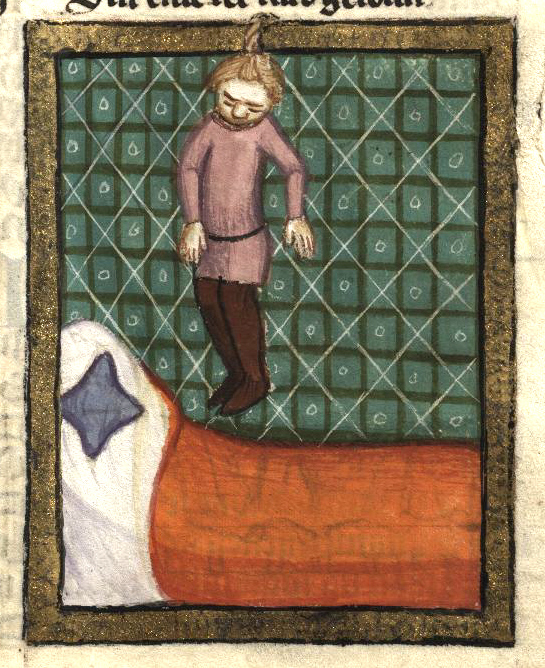
Ahitophel hangs himself from a 14th Chronicle of the World by Rudolf vom Emns

Ahitophel rendered a service to David upon another occasion, but not until he was again threatened with the curse. It appears that David excavated too deeply for the foundations of the Temple, resulting in the earth's deepest floods breaking forth and nearly inundating the earth. None could help but Ahitophel, who withheld his counsel from seeing David borne away upon the flood. When David again warned him of the malediction, Ahitophel counselled the king to throw a tile, with the Tetragrammaton written upon it, into the cavity; the waters began to sink. Ahitophel is said to have defended his use of the name of God in this emergency by referencing the practice enjoined by Scripture (Numbers 5:23) to restore marital harmony; surely a matter of small importance, he argued, compared with the threatened destruction of the world. David's repeated malediction that Ahitophel would be hanged was finally realized when the latter hanged himself.

Ahitophel's death was a great loss to David, for his wisdom was so great that Scripture itself (2 Samuel 16:23) avoids calling him a man, likening him to an angel; in the passage quoted the Hebrew word for man is omitted in the text, being supplied only by the Masorah. (The preceding statement is incorrect because the word for "man" in 2 Samuel 16:23 refers to one who asks at the word of God and not to Ahitophel. Thus, its absence does not imply anything about Ahitophel.) Indeed, his wisdom bordered on that of the angels. His learning in the Law was also extensive so that David did not scruple to call him "master"; the two things which David is there said to have learned from Ahitophel are more closely described in Masechet Kallah. Ahitophel's disposition, however, was a jealous one; and he always sought to wound David by mocking remarks. His devotion to the study of the Law was not founded on worthy motives. Ahitophel was thirty-three years old when he died. In his will, he left three warnings to his children to 1. Refrain from doing aught against a favourite of fortune. 2. Take heed not to rise up against the royal house of David and to take no part in their dissensions 3. If Shavuot falls on a sunny day, then sow wheat. Posterity has been favored with the knowledge of but a small part of Ahitophel's wisdom, and that little through two widely different sources, through Socrates, who was his disciple, and through a fortune-book written by him.

Ahitophel is counted among those that have no share in the world to come.

== In Christian interpretation ==
Christian interpreters often see Judas Iscariot as an antitype to Ahitophel. Alexander Kirkpatrick, in the Cambridge Bible for Schools and Colleges, calls his suicide "the first deliberate suicide on record".

Ahitophel's betrayal of David and subsequent suicide are seen as anticipating Judas' betrayal of Jesus, and the gospels' account of Judas hanging himself (Matthew 27:5). Psalm 41:9, which seems to refer to Ahitophel, is quoted in John 13:18 as being fulfilled in Judas.
