= Hushai =

Friend of David and spy in the Hebrew Bible

Hushai (hus'-sha-i) or Chusai (Hebrew: חוּשַׁי or חוּשַׁי הָאֲרְכִּי 'Hushai the Archite') was a friend of David and a spy according to the Hebrew Bible. During Absalom's rebellion, as described in the Second Book of Samuel, he agrees to act as an advisor to Absalom to sabotage his plans while secretly sending information to David. It was on his advice that Absalom did not immediately pursue the retreating David, thus giving David time to regroup and gather his forces. Hushai's sabotage helped to ensure Absalom's rapid defeat.

== Life ==
Hushai was an Archite, that is, a native of Archi, a place south of the portion of Ephraim, near Bethel Joshua 16:2. He is called in 1 Chronicles 27:33 "the king's friend". This title is similar to that of counselor given to Ahitophel, or that of leader of the army to Joab: there is a similar use of the term in 1 Kings 4:5. In the Books of the Maccabees it is an official title given by the Seleucids to persons of confidence who have important military or civil functions (1 Maccabees 2:18; 3:38; 6:10, 14, 28; 7:6-8; etc.). It is likely then, that Hushai's title of "friend" of King David does not imply the intimate relations suggested by the term.

Nevertheless, the account that is given of him during Absalom's rebellion (2 Samuel 15 - 17) shows that in his case the title was not merely official. After David has heard of the treason of Absalom and that his former counselor Ahitophel was with Absalom, he organizes an evacuation of Jerusalem. On his way up the Mount of Olives he is met by Hushai, whose garments are rent and whose head is covered with dust. He is probably an old man, for David tells him he would be a burden in the flight. But the king does honour to Hushai's cleverness by sending him to Jerusalem, to "defeat the counsel of Ahitophel". Hushai persuades Absalom to take him into his confidence, and, in the council held shortly afterwards in regard to the measures to be taken against David, he overrules Ahitophel and obtains a delay which secures the safety of the king. He is able likewise to convey information to David through Zadok, Abiathar, and their sons: Ahimaaz, Zadok's son and Jonathan, Abiathar's son (2 Samuel 15:36).
