= 1 Kings 2 =

1 Kings, chapter 2

- ← chapter 1 chapter 3 →
- The pages containing the Books of Kings (1 & 2 Kings) Leningrad Codex (1008 CE).
- Book: First book of Kings
- Hebrew Bible part: Nevi'im
- Order in the Hebrew part: 4
- Category: Former Prophets
- Christian Bible part: Old Testament
- Order in the Christian part: 11

1 Kings 2 is the second chapter of the Books of Kings in the Hebrew Bible or the First Book of Kings in the Old Testament of the Christian Bible. The book is a compilation of various annals recording the acts of the kings of Israel and Judah by a Deuteronomic compiler in the seventh century BCE, with a supplement added in the sixth century BCE. This chapter belongs to the section focusing on the reign of Solomon over the unified kingdom of Judah and Israel (1 Kings 1 to 11). The focus of this chapter is the reign of David and Solomon, the kings of Israel.

== Text ==
This chapter was originally written in the Hebrew language and since the 16th century is divided into 53 verses.

=== Textual witnesses ===
Some early manuscripts containing the text of this chapter in Hebrew are of the Masoretic Text tradition, which includes the Codex Cairensis (895), Aleppo Codex (10th century), and Codex Leningradensis (1008).

There is also a translation into Koine Greek known as the Septuagint, made in the last few centuries BCE. Extant ancient manuscripts of the Septuagint version include Codex Vaticanus (B; $\mathfrak{G}$^{B}; 4th century) and Codex Alexandrinus (A; $\mathfrak{G}$^{A}; 5th century). (Note: The whole book of 1 Kings is missing from the extant Codex Sinaiticus.) In the middle of chapter 2 in 1 Kings (3 Reigns 2), the Septuagint of Codex Vaticanus has two long additions, called "Additions 1 and 2":

1. After verse 35 there are 14 additional verses, traditionally denoted 35a–35o,
2. After verse 46 there are 11 additional verses, denoted 46a–46l.

=== Old Testament references ===
- 1 Kings 2:1–9: Psalm 37:1–40
- 1 Kings 2:10–12: 1 Chronicles 29:26–30

== Analysis ==
The first two chapters of the Books of Kings describe the final phase of David's story and the beginning of Solomon's. These chapters are markedly written differently than other biblical and extrabiblical ancient literature.

== David's bequest to Solomon (2:1–12) ==
This section contains the only time in the books of Kings that David spoke directly to Solomon. The parting words are similar to God's words to Joshua after the death of Moses (Joshua 1:6–9). David first charged Solomon to reign in accordance to the "law of Moses" (cf. Deuteronomy 4:29; 6:2; 8:6; 9:5; 11:1; 29:9), because everyone in Israel, even the king (cf. Deuteronomy 17:18–20; Psalm 132:12; cf. 2 Samuel 7:14–16), should fall under God and his laws. It is followed by David's complaints to the 'wise' Solomon about the 'enemies', which were Joab and Shimei ben Gera (cf. 2 Samuel 3:27; 20:9–10; 16:5–14; cf. 19:24) and incited him to deal with them, which gave legitimation for the subsequent purges. David also encouraged reward for the old Barzillai (verse 7, cf. 2 Samuel 17:26–29; 19:32–39). After all the words, David was able to die in peace and buried in the necropolis within the "city of David".

=== Verse 11 ===
And the time that David reigned over Israel was forty years. He reigned seven years in Hebron and thirty-three years in Jerusalem.

- "Forty years": according to Thiele's chronology, David died between September 972 BCE and September 971 BCE at the age of 70, so his birth was between September 1042 BCE and September 1041 BCE.

== The elimination of Adonijah (2:13–25) ==
After a while, Adonijah began to 'dig his own grave' by lusting after Abishag the Shunammite, a dangerous move because 'she had, after all, lain in his father's bed', and 2 Samuel 16:20–22 indicate that having a sexual liaison with David's concubines was to legitimize Absalom's claim to the throne. Adonijah correctly recognized the power and influence of Bathsheba as the queen mother (shown in verse 19). He failed to understand her intentions and character, as she seemed to support Adonijah's petition, yet slipped the phrase 'your brother' to awaken Solomon's fears. Solomon used the opportunity to order Adonijah's execution by the unscrupulous Benaiah.

== The elimination of Abiathar (2:26–27) ==
Solomon did not dare to harm Abiathar, one of David's trusted priests, but he had the authority to relieve the priest of all duties and banish him to Anathoth, a small country town about 5 kilometres (3.1 mi) north of Jerusalem. This is a fulfillment of 1 Samuel 2:27–36. Jeremiah the prophet also came from Anatoth (Jeremiah 1:1; 32), so could be his descendant. Interestingly, David did not mention Abiathar nor Adonijah in his last words, so the actions against them were solely Solomon's decision. Zadok (cf 2 Chronicles 1:8,10, 34, 39) became the sole high priest after the departure of Abiathar (verse 35).

== The elimination of Joab (2:28–35) ==
Joab realized the direction of the purge, so he took refuge in the Tabernacle. Solomon used Joab's word "I will die here" as a request that the king would gladly grant with the addition of justifying words of Joab's past sins (verses 31–33), so Benaiah, under the explicit order of the king, could execute Joab at the altar. For his loyal service, Benaiah was appointed to Joab's post as army chief (verse 35).

== The elimination of Shimei (2:36–46) ==
Solomon plays a cruel game with Shimei, who had done unpleasant things to David, but later received David's personal promise of safety (2 Samuel 16:5–14 and 19:17–24). The king placed Shimei under house arrest, and would only be executed if he left his house with the addition of a seemingly reasonable requirement "not crossing the Wadi Kidron" on the east of Jerusalem. However, when Shimei eventually left his house to Gath, west of Jerusalem, the leaving of the house was the ground for his execution by Benaiah. The outcome of the actions in this chapter is that the kingdom was then firmly in Solomon's hands.

== See also ==
- Abner
- Absalom
- Achish
- Amasa
- Bahurim
- Ark of the Covenant
- Israel
- Jerusalem
- Gath
- Haggith
- Kidron Valley
- Kohen
- Prophet
- Shunammite
- Zeruiah
- Related Bible parts: Deuteronomy 4, Deuteronomy 6, Deuteronomy 8, Deuteronomy 9, Deuteronomy 11, Deuteronomy 29, Deuteronomy 17, 1 Samuel 2, 2 Samuel 7, 2 Samuel 16, 2 Samuel 19, 1 Chronicles 29, Psalm 37, Psalm 132, Jeremiah 1

== Sources ==
- Collins, John J. (2014). "Chapter 14: 1 Kings 12 – 2 Kings 25". Introduction to the Hebrew Scriptures. Fortress Press. pp. 277–296. ISBN 978-1451469233.
- Coogan, Michael David (2007). Coogan, Michael David; Brettler, Marc Zvi; Newsom, Carol Ann; Perkins, Pheme (eds.). The New Oxford Annotated Bible with the Apocryphal/Deuterocanonical Books: New Revised Standard Version, Issue 48 (Augmented 3rd ed.). Oxford University Press. ISBN 978-0195288810.
- Dietrich, Walter (2007). "13. 1 and 2 Kings". In Barton, John; Muddiman, John (eds.). The Oxford Bible Commentary (first (paperback) ed.). Oxford University Press. pp. 232–266. ISBN 978-0199277186.
- Halley, Henry H. (1965). Halley's Bible Handbook: an abbreviated Bible commentary (24th (revised) ed.). Zondervan Publishing House. ISBN 0-310-25720-4.
- Hayes, Christine (2015). Introduction to the Bible. Yale University Press. ISBN 978-0300188271.
- Leithart, Peter J. (2006). 1 & 2 Kings. Brazos Theological Commentary on the Bible. Brazos Press. ISBN 978-1587431258.
- McFall, Leslie (1991), "Translation Guide to the Chronological Data in Kings and Chronicles" (PDF), Bibliotheca Sacra, 148: 3–45, archived from the original (PDF) on 2010-08-27
- McKane, William (1993). "Kings, Book of". In Metzger, Bruce M; Coogan, Michael D (eds.). The Oxford Companion to the Bible. Oxford University Press. pp. 409–413. ISBN 978-0195046458.
- Metzger, Bruce M; Coogan, Michael D, eds. (1993). The Oxford Companion to the Bible. Oxford University Press. ISBN 978-0195046458.
- Thiele, Edwin R. (1983). The Mysterious Numbers of the Hebrew Kings (3rd ed.). Grand Rapids, Michigan: Zondervan. ISBN 978-0-310-36010-0.
- Tov, Emanuel (1999). "38. The Septuagint Additions ('Miscellanies') in 1 Kings 2 (3 Reigns 2)". The Greek and Hebrew Bible: Collected Essays on the Septuagint. Vetus Testamentum Supplements. Vol. 72. Leiden: Brill.
- Ulrich, Eugene, ed. (2010). The Biblical Qumran Scrolls: Transcriptions and Textual Variants. Brill.
- Würthwein, Ernst (1995). The Text of the Old Testament. Translated by Rhodes, Erroll F. Grand Rapids, MI: Wm. B. Eerdmans. ISBN 0-8028-0788-7.
