= Hagith (opera) =

Opera by Karol Szymanowski

- Opera by Karol Szymanowski
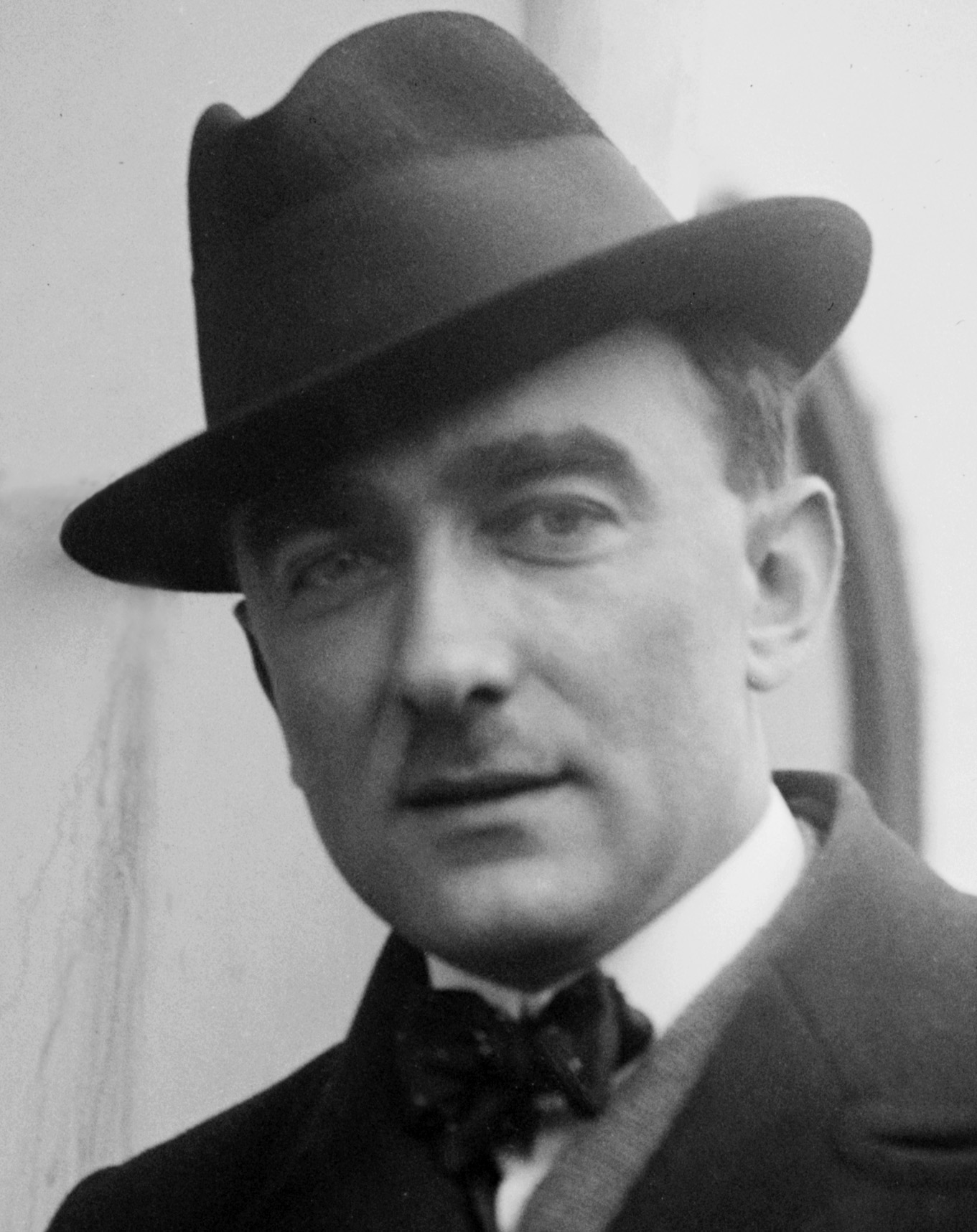
- The composer
- Librettist: Felix Dörmann
- Language: German
- Premiere: 13 May 1922; Grand Theatre, Warsaw

Hagith, Op. 25, is an opera in one act by the Polish composer and pianist Karol Szymanowski. The opera premiered at the Grand Theatre, Warsaw in 1922, nine years after its creation. The libretto in German was written by the Viennese secessionist poet and Szymanowski's friend Felix Dörmann.

== Background and performance history ==
Szymanowski wrote the opera in 1912–1913 while living in Vienna, Austria. The piano–vocal score was first published by Universal Edition Vienna in 1920. Musically and dramatically, Hagith has been compared to Richard Strauss's Salome. The opera made its premiere on 13 May 1922 at the Great Theatre, Warsaw, Poland, and it has been produced four times. Szymanowski commissioned a Polish translation of the text (by Stanisław Barącz), but the project was not successful.

The opera was criticized and disparaged in the interwar Poland notably by critic (and writer of prayer songs) Stanisław Niewiadomski, a devout Catholic and former official in the Austrian Partition, as well as other clericalists, due to its author's openly gay lifestyle.

== Roles ==
Roles, voice types, premiere cast
Role	Voice type	Premiere cast: May 13, 1922 Conductor: Emil Młynarski
The aged king	tenor	Ignacy Dygas
The young king	tenor	Stanisław Gruszczyński
Hagith	soprano	Maria Mokrzycka
The high priest	bass	
The physician	baritone	
A servant	silent actor	
Chorus: the people

== Synopsis ==
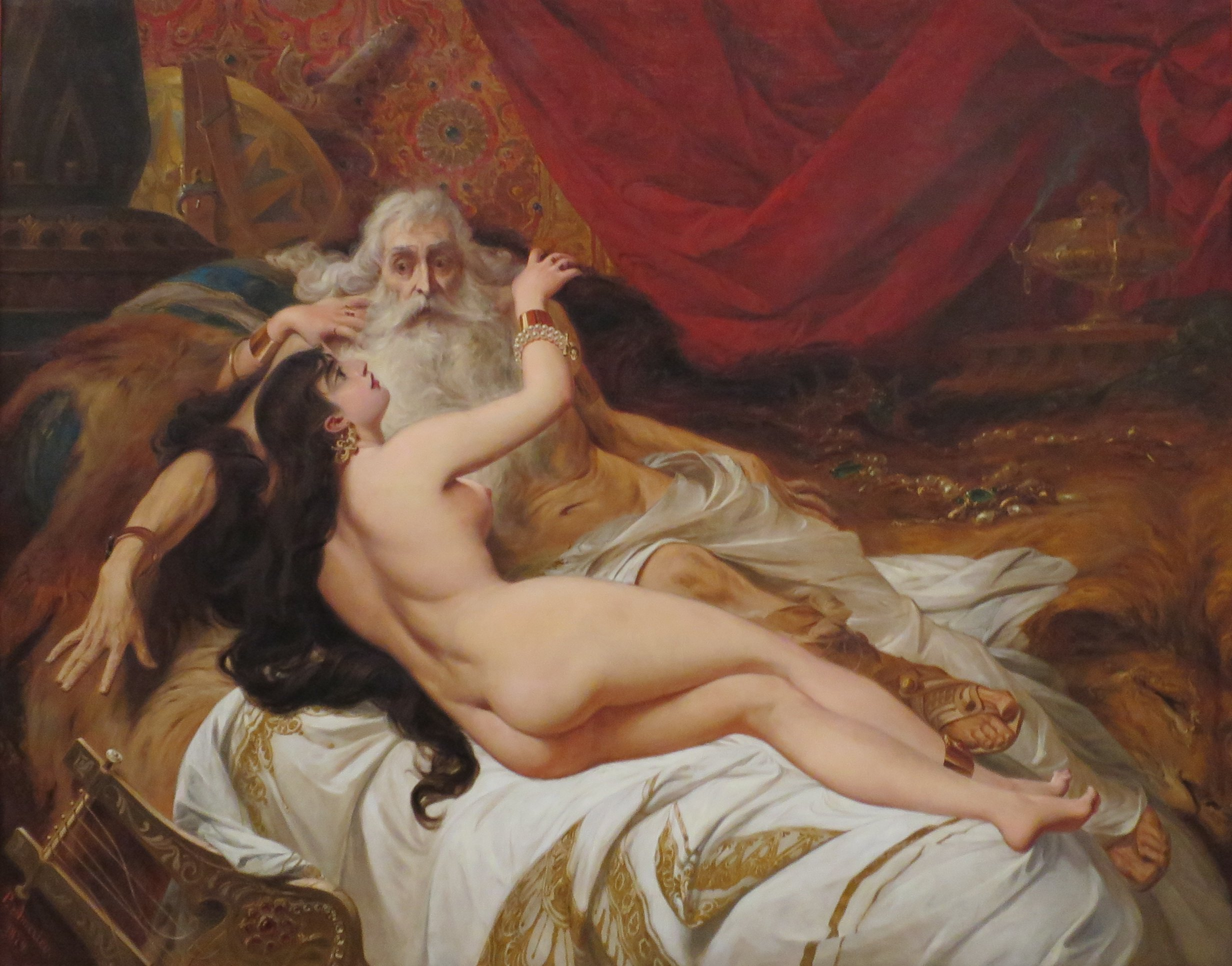
David and Abishag (Hagith), 1879 oil painting of the biblical story which is the basis of the libretto, by Pedro Américo

The libretto by Felix Dörmann is loosely based on the Old Testament, with the emphasis on deception and jealousy in love and death, similar to other popular motifs in operatic works of the early 20th century including Salome and Elektra by Strauss. Dörmann's libretto tells a Biblical story of King David, the aged king in the opera, his female servant Abishag (Hagith) and Solomon (the young king), as described in chapter one of the first Book of Kings. However, in the Bible, the young woman is called "Avishag", not Hagith. Haggith is one of the wives of David, the mother of Adonijah.

In the libretto, the old and ailing king is told by the high priest and his doctor, that only the love of a young girl can bring him a new lease of life. He remains suspicious, because his son has just been crowned against his will with great fanfare. Later that evening, the old king attempts to banish his son. The young Hagith is brought to him right after that, and Hagith sees the young king leaving his quarters. The two mutually declare their love for each other. Hagith refuses to make a sacrifice on behalf of the aged king. Losing her temper, she tells the old king she hates him, upon which he dies from too much anger. Hagith rushes outside and pronounces his death. She is accused of killing him by the priest and sentenced to death by stoning. The new king attempts to save her, but it is too late.

== Instrumentation ==
The orchestral score calls for:

- 4 flutes (4th doubling piccolo), 3 oboes, English horn, 4 clarinets (3 in B♭, 1 in E♭ doubling clarinet in A), bass clarinet in B♭, 3 bassoons, contrabassoon
- 6 horns in F, 4 trumpets in C, 4 trombones, bass tuba
- timpani, percussion^{6}, 2 harps, celesta, harmonium, organ
- strings (violins I, violins II, violas, violoncellos, double basses)

On stage music: 4 trumpets in D, 4 trombones, timpani, triangle.

== Recordings ==
The opera has been rarely recorded: the first recording of the opera is on DVD Video, with Tomasz Szreder conducting the chorus and orchestra of the Wrocław Opera. Since then, there has been a performance at the Teatro Colón in Buenos Aires 2012.
