= Janina Strzembosz =

Polish dancer, choreographer and director (1908–1991)

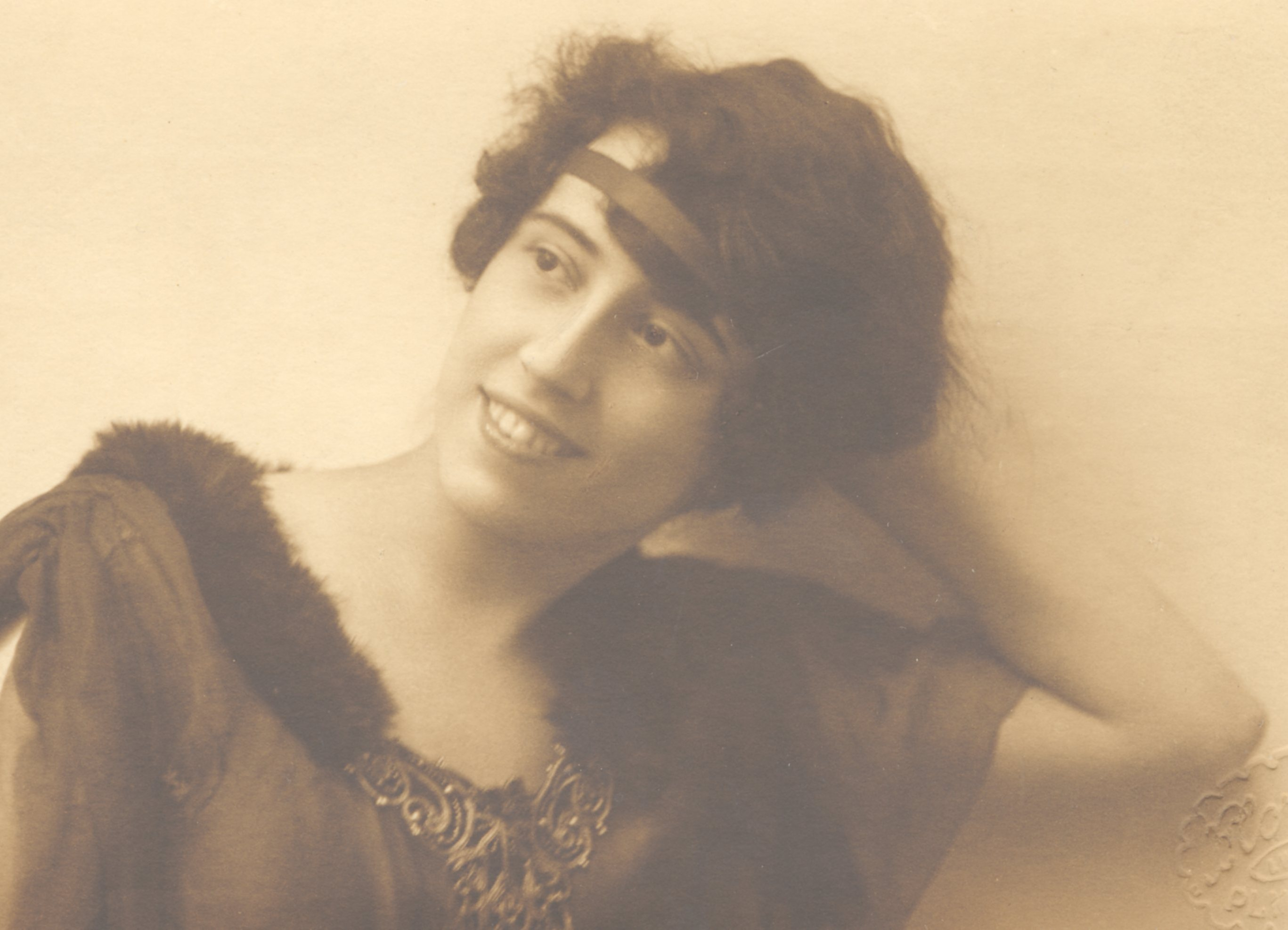
Janina Strzembosz in 1933

Janina Strzembosz (August 31, 1908, Lviv – December 21, 1991, Cracow) was a Polish dancer, choreographer, teacher, publicist, pianist, conductor and director, and one of the most acclaimed personas in Polish dance of the 20th century. A pupil of Isadora Duncan, Strzembosz herself taught several generations of dancers, choreographers and dance instructors.

== Early life and education ==
Strzembosz came from a Polish landed gentry family. Her father, Marian Strzembosz, graduated in law from the Jagiellonian University and studied painting under Franz von Lenbach in Munich. In 1900, he became a member of the "Kunstverein", and regularly exhibited his artworks, mostly portraits. Her mother, Helena Strzembosz née Cieńska, was a pianist and a pupil of Edvard Grieg. She came from a Polish aristocratic family with a strong connection to the arts. Her grandmother, Malwina Cieńska née Malczewska, was a talented pianist and a pupil of Ferenc Liszt.

Strzembosz spent her early life in Munich, Germany. She studied classical piano at a conservatory. From 1913, she had been Isadora Duncan’s pupil. Throughout her school years, she studied with Isadora in Munich, Zurich, Berlin, Florence, Paris and Monte Carlo. She was one of a very few to receive a diploma of Isadora’s school. During her time in Munich, she took rhythmics classes with Rudolf Bode, learned classical ballet with Lucy Kieselhausen in Vera Ornelli’s studio, took gesture dance classes in Francisa Zwingmann’s school and acting/directing studies with Max Reinhardt in Vienna. She also attended a variety of courses around Europe e.g. with Mary Wigman in Dresden, Rudolf von Leban in Berlin and Harald Kreuzberg in Vienna.

== Work ==
After the Second World War, Strzembosz moved to Cracow, Poland. From 1946-1948, she worked as a teacher of stage movement and fine arts at the AST National Academy of Theatre Arts in Kraków, under the patronage of Ludwik Solski. Later, Juliusz Osterwa, who engaged her in this work said; “We will have Isadora Duncan at our school”. In 1947, Strzembosz established a Choreography Institute as a part of the People’s Music Institute in Łódź, which due to financial issues collapsed in 1951. Strzembosz’s variety of skills and knowledge allowed her to collaborate with many art institutes in Cracow, such as the Helena Modrzejewska National Stary Theater in Kraków, the Juliusz Słowacki Theatre, the Grotesque Theatre, the Young Viewers' Theatre, and the Krakow Opera Society. From 1949, she worked at the Provincial House of Trade Unions Culture, later the Krakow Culture Centre in the Palace "Under the Rams", where she ran the instructor club, offering choreography and qualification courses under the patronage of the Ministry of Culture and Art.

In 1977-1981 she worked at the Dance Studio with “Mimus” - a drama dance group. Strzembosz created many art plays e.g. Poprzez wieki (Through the ages), Suita tańców historycznych XVI wieku (Suite of historical dances of the 16th century), Otrzęsiny drukarskie (Remnants of print). From 1979-1989, Strzembosz also worked with Ars Antiqua, a historical dance group, on Listy z okresu Romantyzmu (Letters from the Romantic period), Nie masz to, jak król Jan III Sobieski (You don't have it like King Jan III Sobieski), Polonia, Przebaczam (I forgive), Tajemniczy uśmiech Mony Lisy (Mona Lisa's mysterious smile), Stanisław i Anna Oświecimowie (Stanisław and Anna Oświecim), Aleksandro Cagliostro, Intryga Królowej (Zygmunt August i Barbara) (The Queen's Intrigue (Zygmunt August and Barbara)).

== Bibliography ==
- Agnieszka Gorczyca "Sylwetka Janiny Strzembosz du Faur", Studia Choreologica vol. XI str. 233
