= Haggith =

Biblical figure; a wife of the Israelite king David

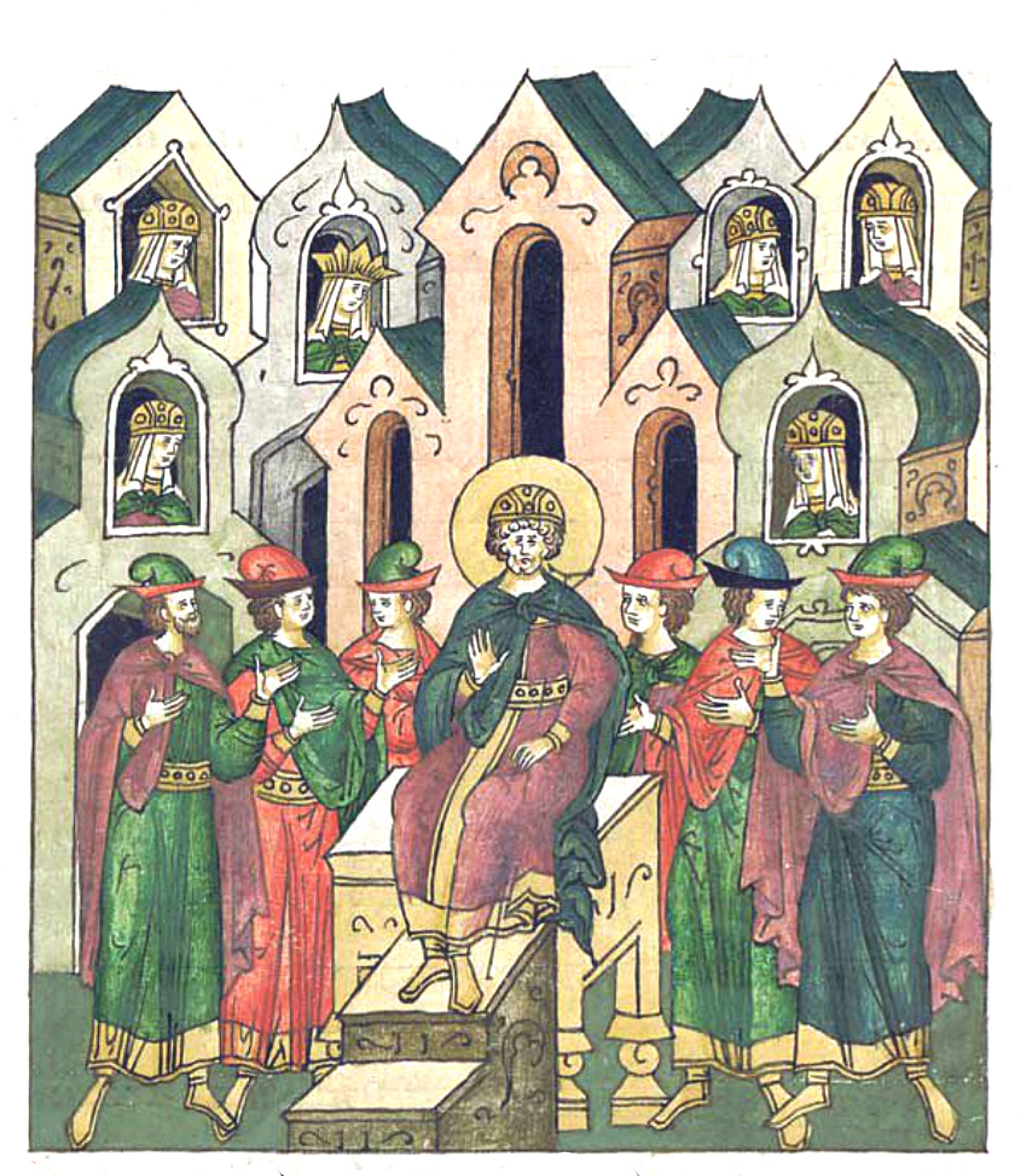
David with his sons and wives including Haggith

Haggith (Hebrew: חַגִּית Ḥaggīṯ; sometimes Hagith, Aggith) is a biblical figure, one of the wives of David. Her name means "festive."

Haggith is mentioned in 2 Samuel 3:4, 1 Kings 1–2, and 1 Chronicles 3:2. She only appears as the mother of Adonijah, the fourth of David's sons, born (according to 2 Samuel 3) in Hebron, while David was fighting Saul.

While Adonijah is usually described in the Bible as "the son of Haggith," there is no suggestion that his mother was involved in his attempt to gain the throne, or with his (likely politically motivated) attempt to take Abishag, his father's nurse.

== Later references ==
The Polish composer Karol Szymanowski wrote in 1912 the opera Hagith, based on a biblical theme. However, the title character is in fact not based on the biblical character of that name but on her contemporary Avishag.

The 19th-century Eastern European Jewish writer Abraham Mapu used "Hagit", derived from the above, as the name of the female protagonist in his 1853 historical novel Ahavat Tzion ("Love of Tzion"), considered the first Hebrew novel. The book itself is set in a later biblical time, the period of King Ahaz. At the time of publication and for generations afterwards Mapu's book was widely read, exerted considerable cultural influence among Jews and influenced the development of the budding Zionist movement. Due especially to Mapu's book, Hagit – not previously attested among Jews – is commonly used as a female first name in contemporary Israel.
