= Irena Solska =

Polish actress (d. 1958)

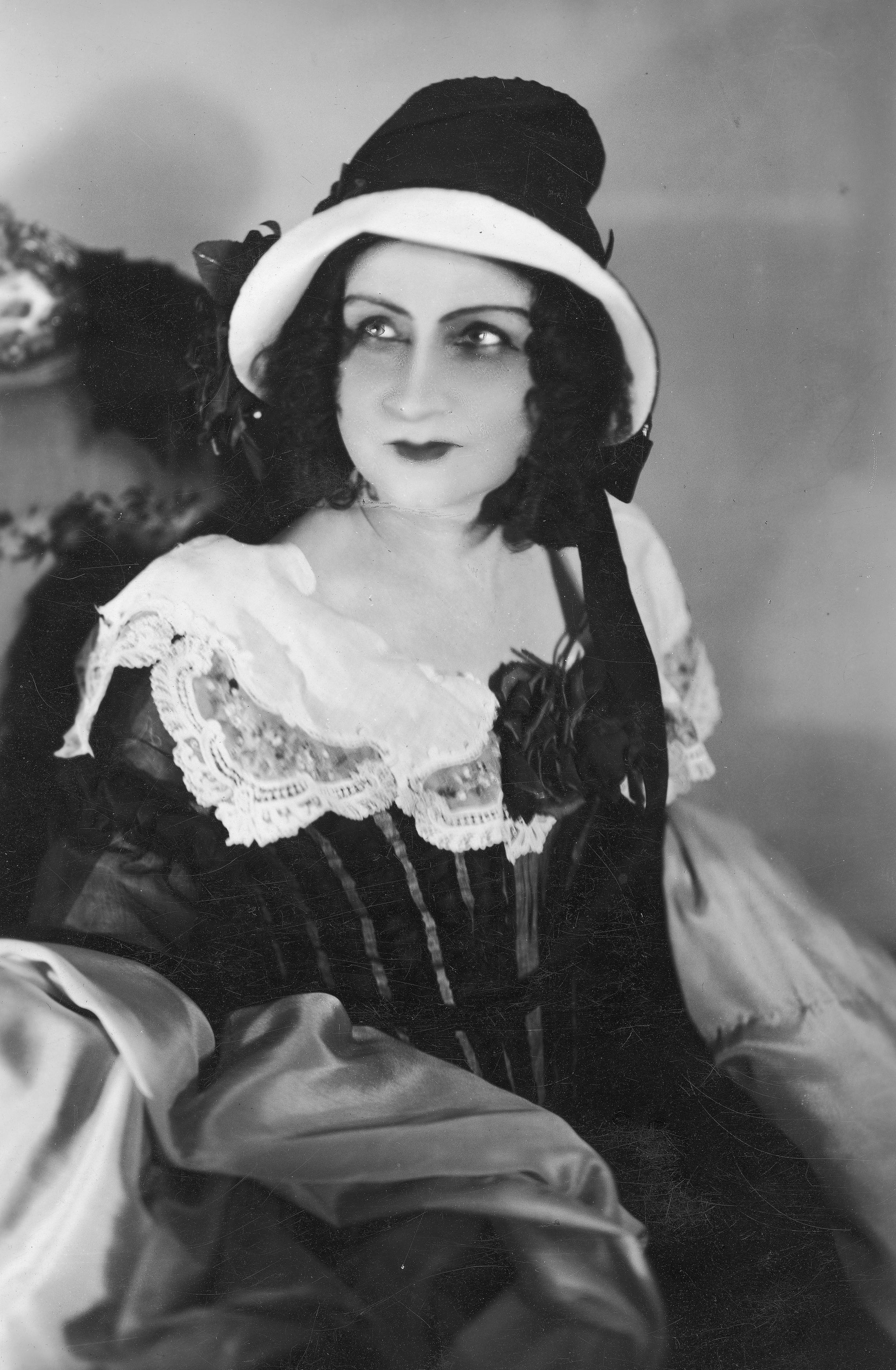
- Solska in 1929
- Born: Karolina Flora Poświk; 27 October 1877; Warsaw, Congress Poland
- Died: 8 March 1958 (aged 80); Skolimowo, Polish People's Republic
- Occupations: Actress, stage director

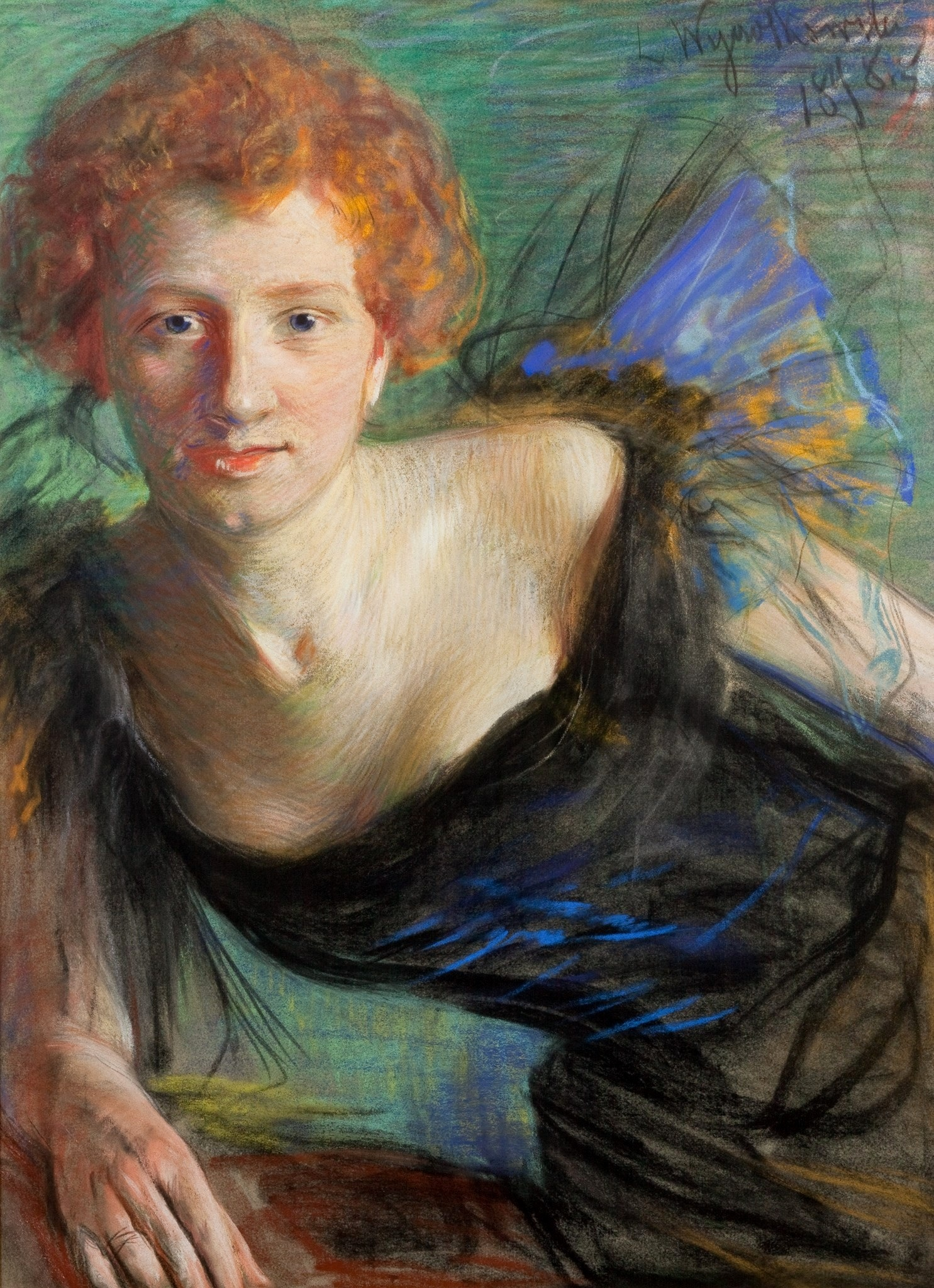
Irena Solska by Leon Wyczółkowski (1899)

Karolina "Irena" Flora Solska (née Poświk; 27 October 1877 — 8 March 1958) was a Polish actress and stage director. She was a member of the Young Poland modernist artistic movement.

== Career ==
Solska made her debut under the name of Irena Górska, playing the title role in a production of Friedrich Halm's Count René at the Victoria Theatre in Łódź.

Solska often worked with writer Jerzy Żuławski, with whom she was in a relationship between 1904 and 1906. One of her most famous roles was that of Psyche in Eros and Psyche, based on Apuleius' Cupid and Psyche, which she performed for twenty years of her career and which Żuławski wrote especially for her. He also wrote The Myrtle Wreath (Wianek mirtowy, 1903) and Ilola (1905) for her.

Between 1920 and 1930 she wrote her autobiography; however that text was lost during World War II, and she returned to writing it after the war.

During the German occupation of Poland, Solska was a member of Żegota ("Polish Council to Aid Jews"). While living in Warsaw during the war, Solska helped to rescue Jews by making her apartment available as a hiding place. According to Joanna Michlic, Solska was known for offering help when all other avenues for rescue had been exhausted.

A portrait of Solska is present in a stained glass window of Fribourg Cathedral in Fribourg, Switzerland. In a scene by Polish painter Józef Mehoffer, Solska is portrayed as "Helvetia" thanking the Virgin Mary for the victory in the Battle of Morat (1476), in a piece titled Our Lady of Victory.

== Personal life ==
According to her biographer, Nataliya Yakubova, Solska was afraid of inheriting a psychological disorder from her grandmother. Solska once attempted suicide, fearing she would be afflicted by madness.

Solska was married to Ludwik Solski, also a Polish stage director. After divorcing him, she married Otton Grosser, a colonel in the Polish army and during World War II a member of the anti-Nazi resistance Home Army. Grosser was executed by Nazi Germany in February 1943.

== Awards ==
- Order of Polonia Restituta Commander's Cross
- Gold Cross of Merit
