= Mokrzycki =

Mokrzycki (feminine Mokrzycka) is a Polish surname. Notable people with the surname include:

- Maria Mokrzycka (1882–1971), Polish opera singer
- Michał Mokrzycki (born 1997), Polish footballer
- Mieczysław Mokrzycki (born 1961), Polish archbishop
