= Portrait of Fabrizio Salvaresio =

Painting by Titian

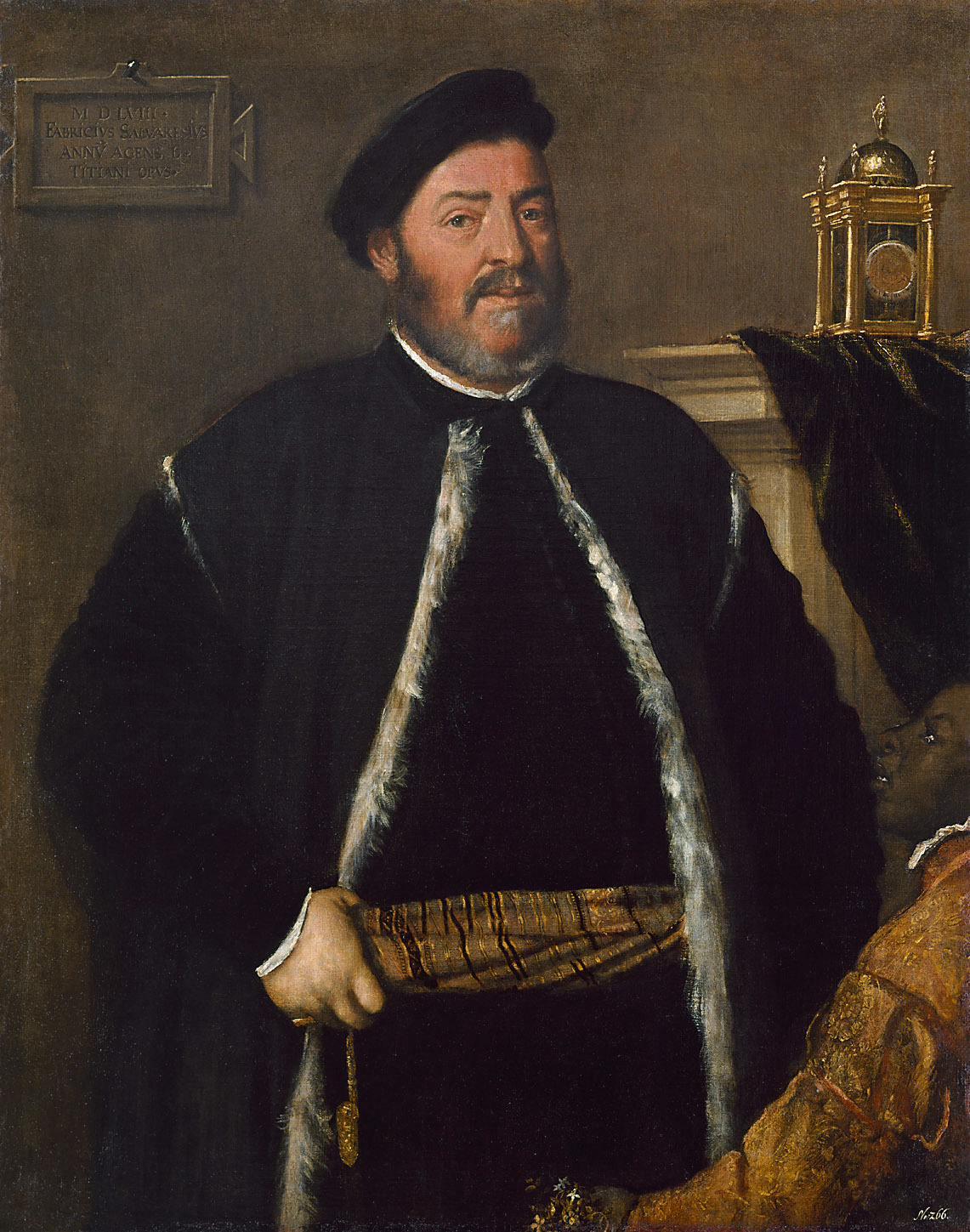
- Artist: Titian
- Year: 1558
- Medium: Oil on canvas
- Dimensions: 112 cm × 88 cm (44 in × 35 in)
- Location: Kunsthistorisches Museum; Vienna
- Accession: GG_1605

Portrait of Fabrizio Salvaresio is an oil painting by Titian. It is signed and dated 1558, and hangs today in the Kunsthistorisches Museum, in Vienna.

== Analysis ==
According to Georg Gronau, though damaged and repainted, this seems to be a genuine work by Titian, but not of very good quality. The names of sitter and painter appear on the Tabula ansata in the background, along with the date of composition, 1558. It is signed, "M.DLVIII, Fabricius Salvaresius, Annv̄ Agens ʟ, Titiani Opus".

Salvaresio is portrayed as a wealthy merchant with an air of self-confidence, and the negro boy painted in profile at the bottom right of the picture may refer to involvement in the slave trade.

== Provenance ==
From the collection of Archduke Leopold Wilhelm, which, in 1662, came into the possession of Emperor Leopold.

- 1636—Collection of Bartolomeo della Nave, Venice;
- 1638–1649—Collection of the Duke of Hamilton (possibly);
- Collection of Archduke Leopold Wilhelm.

== Gallery ==
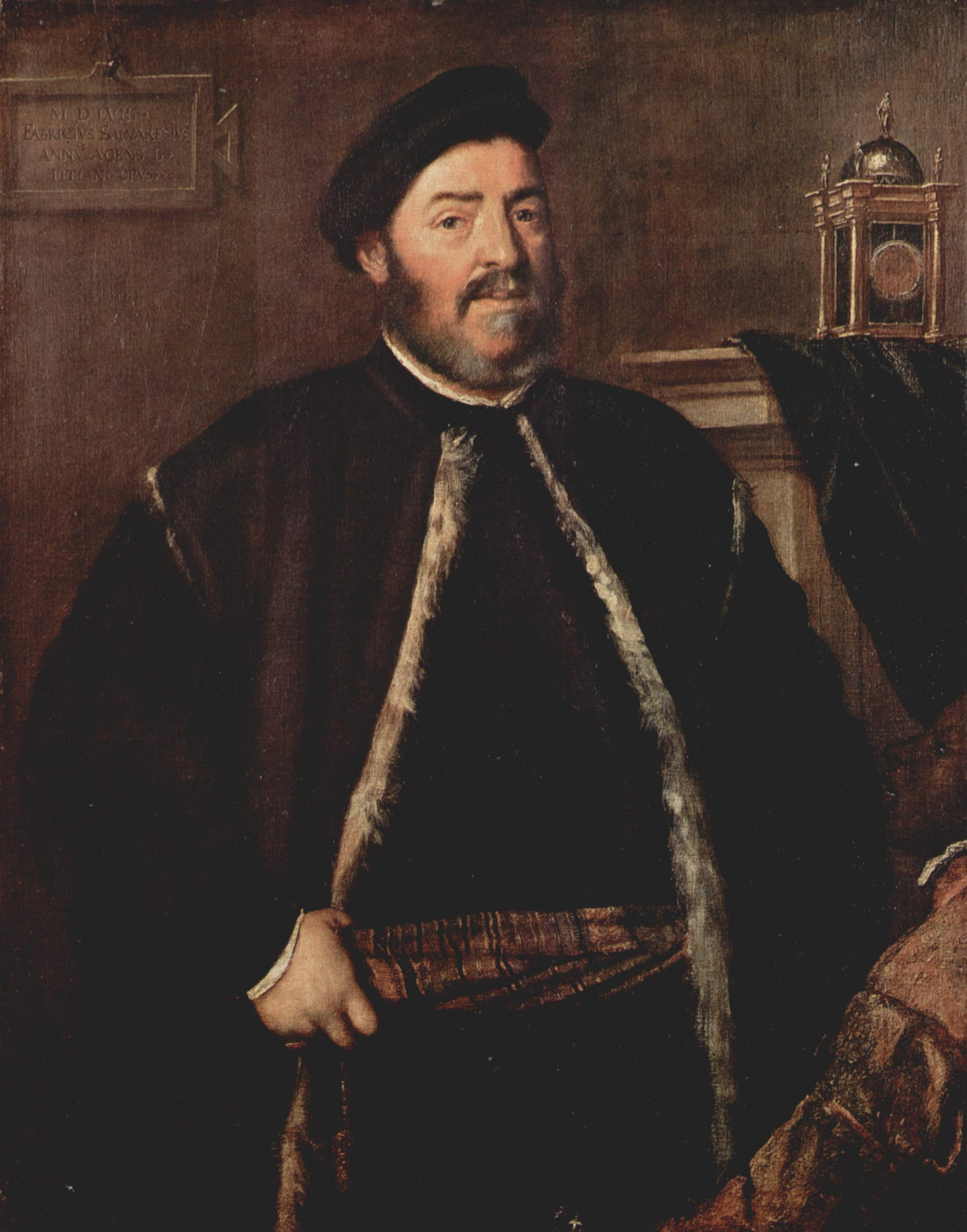
Original portrait by Titian, 1558

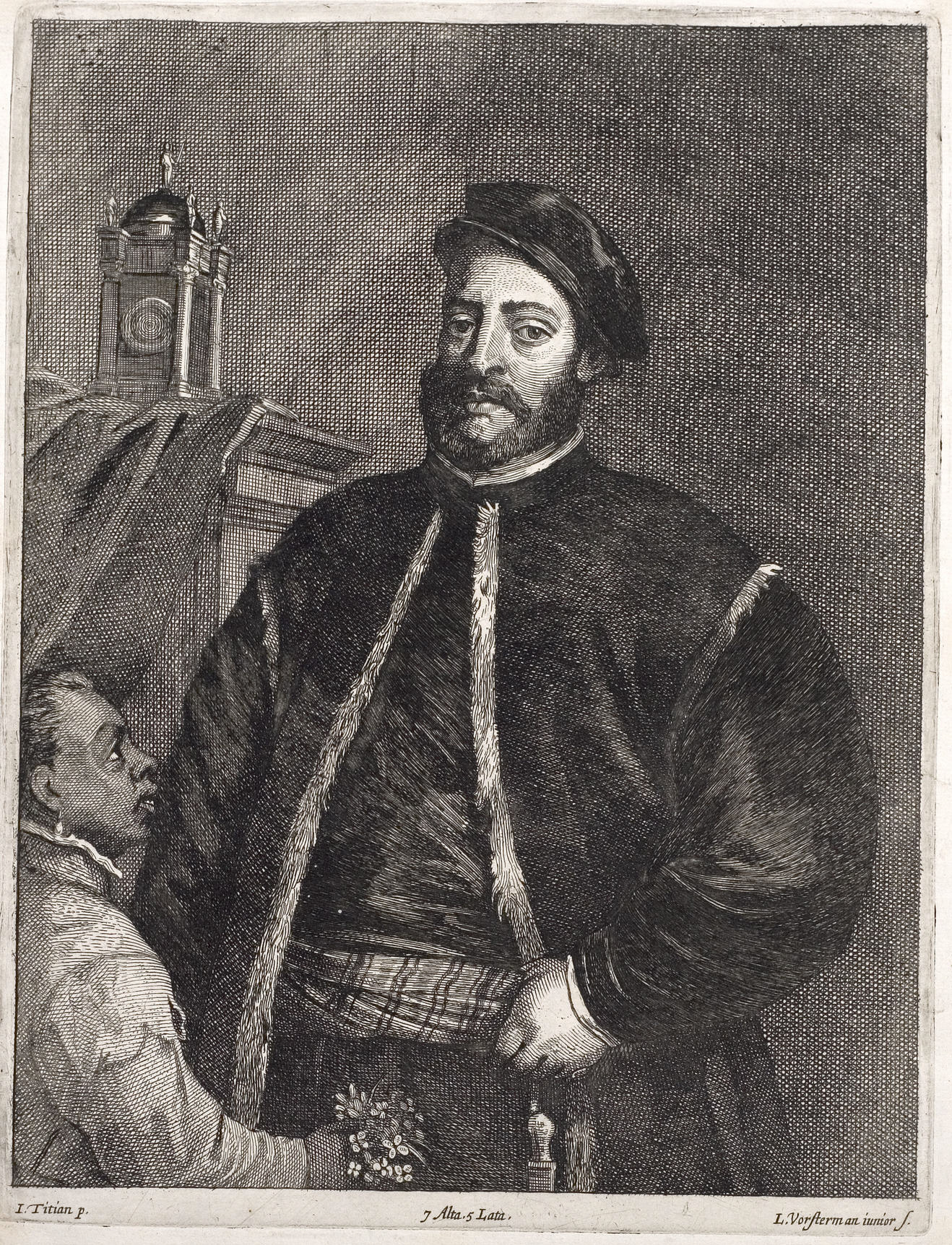
Engraved by Lucas Vorsterman the Younger after Titian for the Theatrum Pictorium, 1673

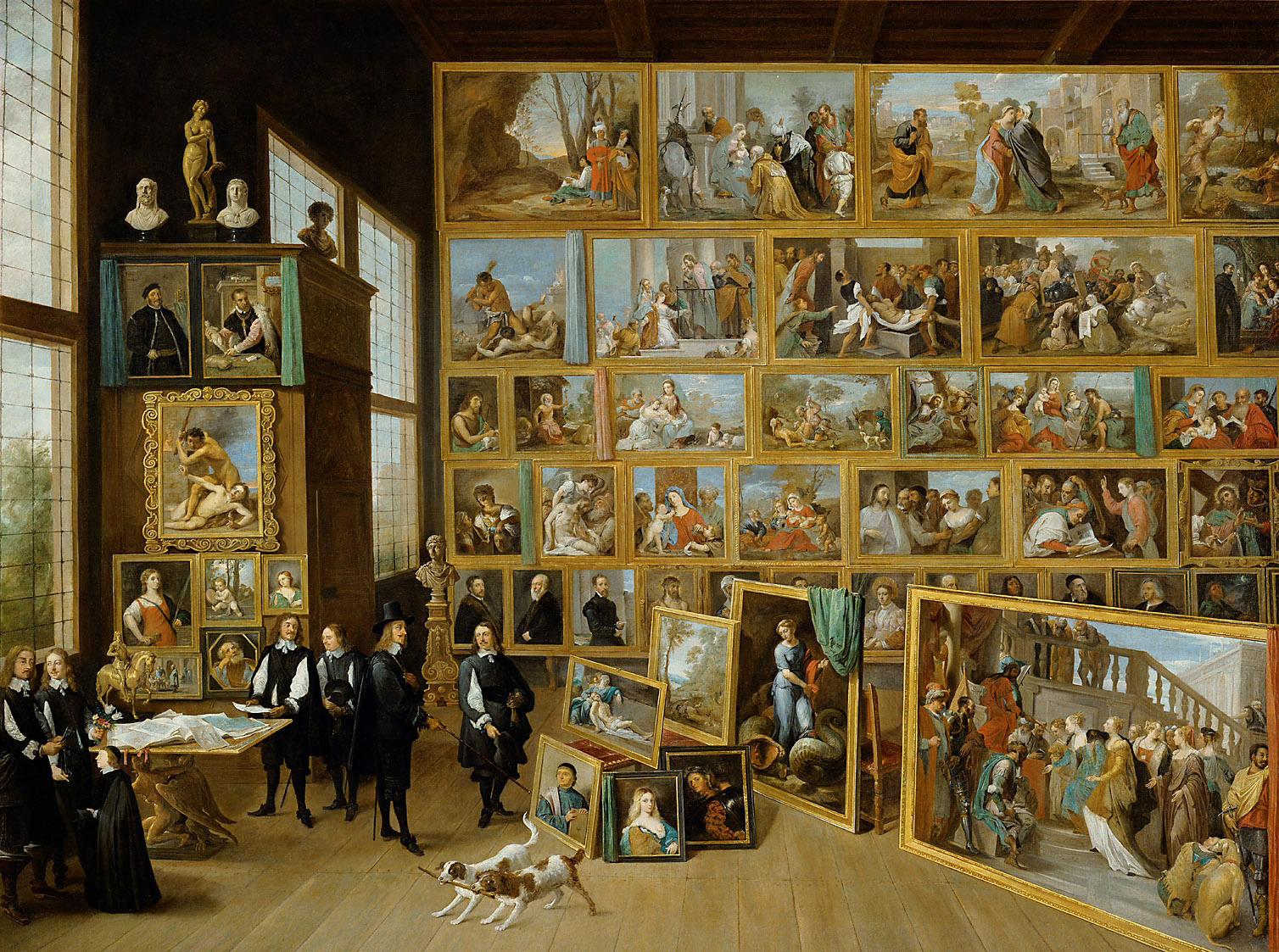
Archduke Leopold Wilhelm in his Gallery in Brussels by David Teniers the Younger, c. 1650

== Sources ==
- Gronau, Georg (1904). Titian. London: Duckworth and Co; New York: Charles Scribner's Sons. p. 275.
- Ricketts, Charles (1910). Titian. London: Methuen & Co. Ltd. p. 175.
- "Fabrizio Salvaresio". Kunsthistorisches Museum Wien. Retrieved 23 November 2022.
