= Shunamitism =

Obsolete medical theory

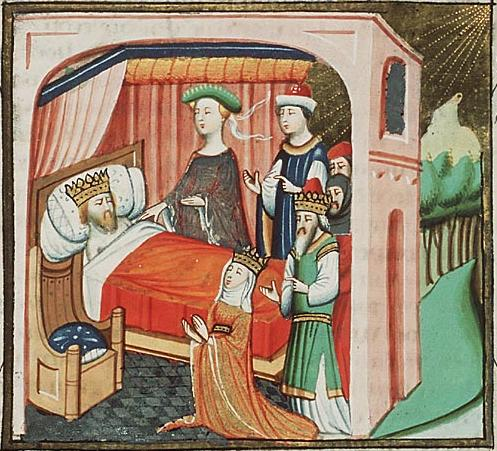
Abishag the Shunamite tends to aging David, c. 1435.

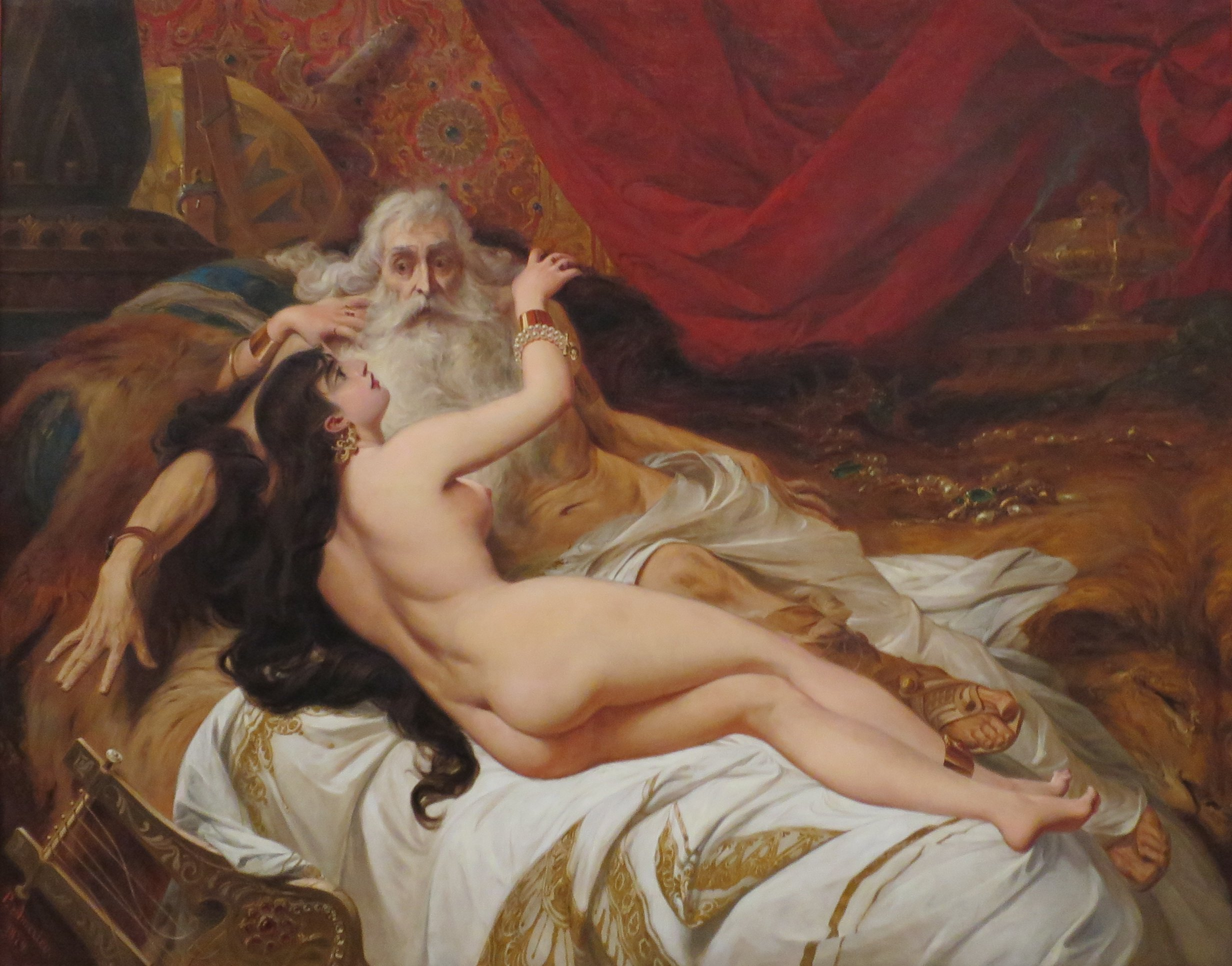
David and Abishag by Pedro Américo, 1879

Shunamitism (also referred to as gerocomy) is the practice of an old man sleeping with, but not necessarily having sex with, a young virgin to preserve his youth. It is considered an esoteric youth-enhancing method. The rationale was that the heat and moisture of the young woman would transfer to the old man and revitalize him.

The term is based on the biblical story of King David and Abishag. The young woman, who was from Shunem, was also referred to as a Shunammite. When King David was old and could not stay warm, his servants found Abishag to sleep with him, though he had no intimate relations with her: therefore, she was still a virgin.

Among scientific physicians, Thomas Sydenham (17th century) prescribed shunamitism for his patients. The Dutch Herman Boerhaave (18th century) also recommended this method to an old Burgomaster, citing it can restore strength and spirits.

== Similar East Asian traditions ==
The practice is known in Chinese as shǎoyīn tóngqǐn (少陰同寢), a reference to a specific meridian of qi in traditional Chinese medicine.

=== China ===
In the 16th century Chinese medical book Bencao Gangmu by Li Shizhen, it records that "For old man, or humans who lack the energy, sleep with a girl who is before 14, as there is no better medicine than receiving the qi that is present in a young girl", however it advises not to do any sexual acts and just sleep when performing the practice, as it would have a reverse effect if you do. The book also notes the relatively new variant during the time called "contact for supplementation", which lets the girl send the qi to enter the nose orifices, navel, and essence (sperm) gate, so as to reach their cinnabar fields. It also advises to perform it during the nighttime instead of daytime. Su Nü Jing states how sleeping with a virgin would make diseases disappear.

=== Korea ===
The young girl used for the practice was called "witbangagi" (윗방아기) and was typically of slave origin or from a poor economic background, often employed by the Yangban class. The practice continued until the early 20th century.

== See also ==
- Rejuvenation
- Traditional Chinese medicines derived from the human body
- Virgin cleansing myth, the belief that sex with a virgin can cure HIV/AIDS, which has led some people with HIV/AIDS to sexually abuse children or other people thought to be virgins
