= Resurrection of the Widow of Nain's Son =

Painting by Paolo Veronese

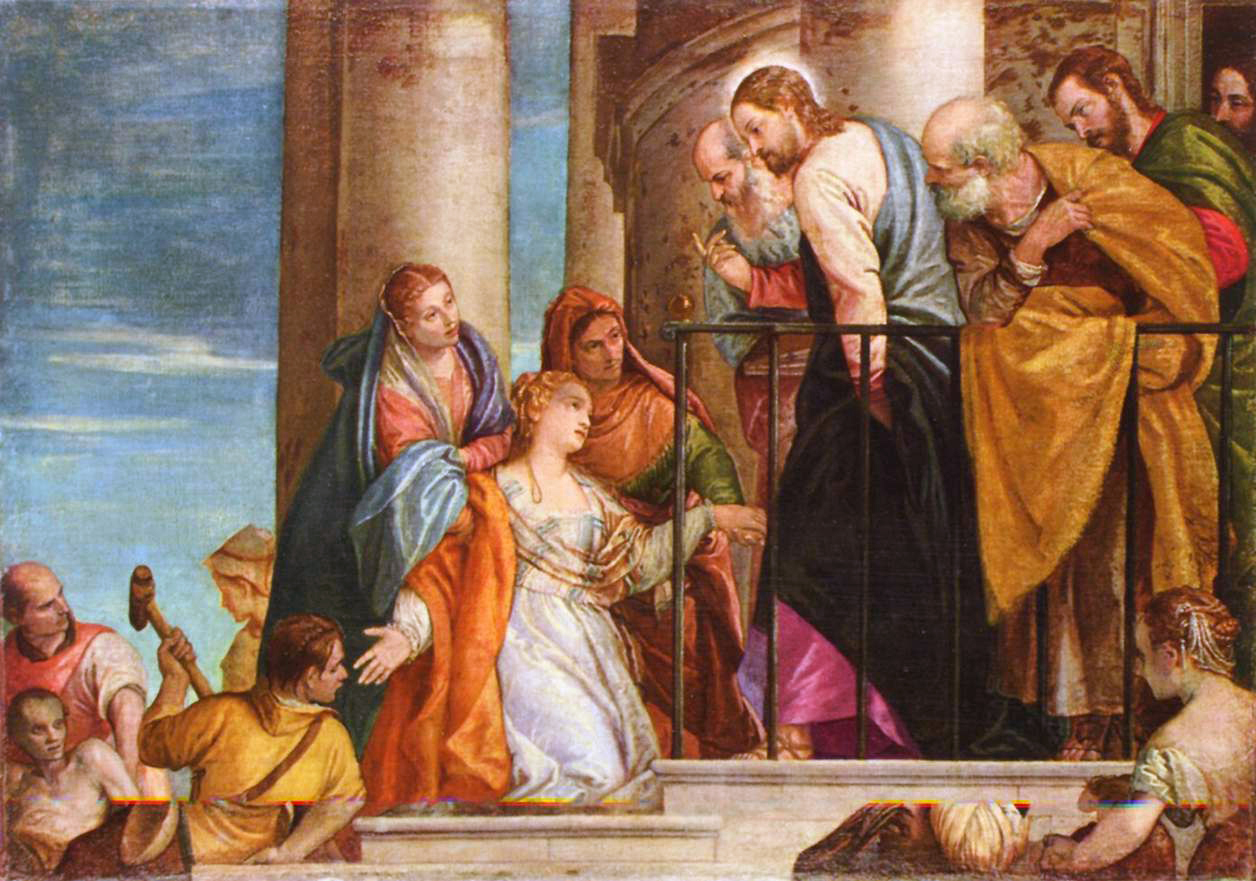
Resurrection of the Widow of Nain's Son (c. 1565–1570) by Paolo Veronese

Resurrection of the Widow of Nain's Son is an oil painting on canvas painted by the Italian artist Paolo Veronese, from c. 1565–1570. Initially in Bartolomeo della Nave's collection, it was acquired in 1659 by Archduke Leopold Wilhelm of Austria and is now in the Kunsthistorisches Museum in Vienna (catalogue number GG 52).

It depicts the raising of the son of the widow of Nain, showing her and her friends in aristocratic Venetian dresses of the time and Jesus standing in front of a colonnade akin to those on contemporary theatrical scenery.
