= Maria Moscisca =

Polish operatic soprano (1882–1971)

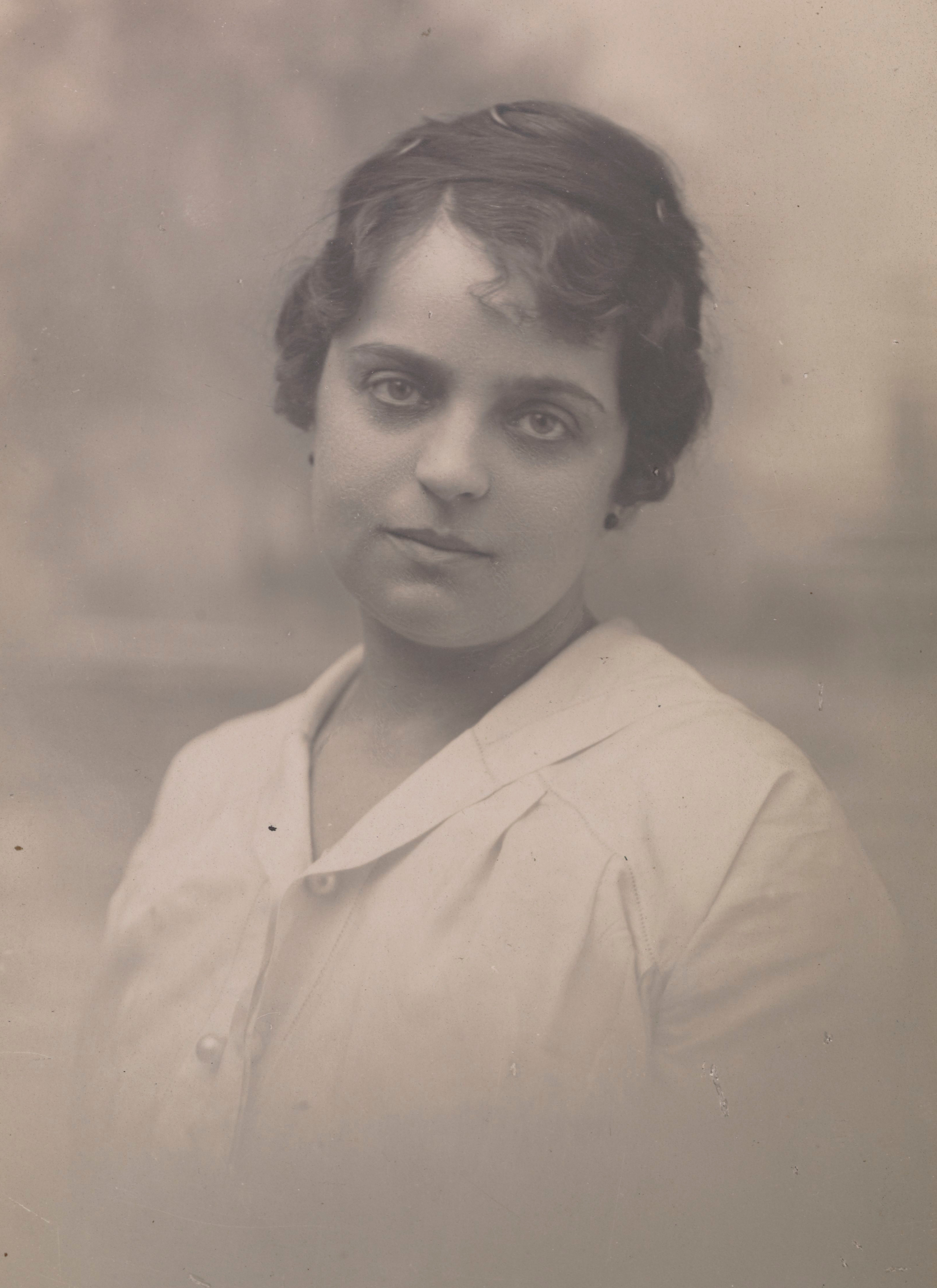
- Moscisca in 1918
- Born: Maria Mokrzycka; 15 March 1882; Lviv
- Died: 5 May 1971 (aged 89); Skolimów-Konstancin, Poland
- Education: Lviv Conservatory
- Occupations: Operatic soprano; Voice teacher
- Organizations: Lviv Opera; Warsaw Opera; Warsaw Conservatory

Maria Moscisca (25 March 1882 – 15 May 1971) was a Polish operatic soprano and voice teacher. She first performed at the Lviv Opera and Warsaw Opera before she entered a career in Italy from 1909. She sang as a guest on major stages in Europe and made a tour of the U.S. in 1913. Back in Warsaw, she was a leading singer to 1932.

== Life ==
Born Maria Mokrzycka in Lviv (now Ukraine), she studied at the conservatory of Lviv under Walery Wysocki. She made her debut at the Lviv Opera in 1905. In 1908, she first performed at the Warsaw Opera in Franz Doppler's Wanda. At the time, the Italian baritone Mattia Battistini sang there as a guest and inspired her to pursue a career in Italy. They moved there in 1909, appeared together and made recordings in 1912. In 1913, she appeared as Elisabeth in Wagner's Lohengrin at the Opera in Bologna and the Teatro Real in Madrid and as Nedda in Leoncavallo's Pagliacci at the Valencia Opera. She took part in a U.S. tour of the Western Metropolitan Opera Company the same year, appearing for example at the San Francisco Opera as Violetta in Verdi's La traviata and Desdemona in Otello. A review by Anna Cora Winchell of the San Francisco Chronicle described her as "the impersonation of grace and refinement", and her voice as "pure and birdlike", portraying the development of her character with flexible expression. In Italy, she performed in Genova, Turin and Bergamo, and in Europe, also in Vienna, Budapest and Barcelona.

She was a leading singer at the Warsaw Opera from 1916 to 1932 where she performed in the world premiere of Zemlinsky's Hagith on 13 May 1922. Her roles included Tatiana in Tchaikovsky's Eugene Onegin, Mimi in Puccini's La bohème, the title role in Madame Butterfly and Sieglinde in Wagner's Die Walküre. After retiring from the stage, she worked as a voice teacher at the Warsaw Conservatory.

She left recordings of five duets with Battistini, including from Verdi's Rigoletto and La traviata, and Donizetti's Linda di Chamounix. with the Orchestra Carlo Sabajno.

She died in Skolimów-Konstancin at age 89.
