= Adonijah =

Fourth son of the Israelite king David

- King Rebel of Israel
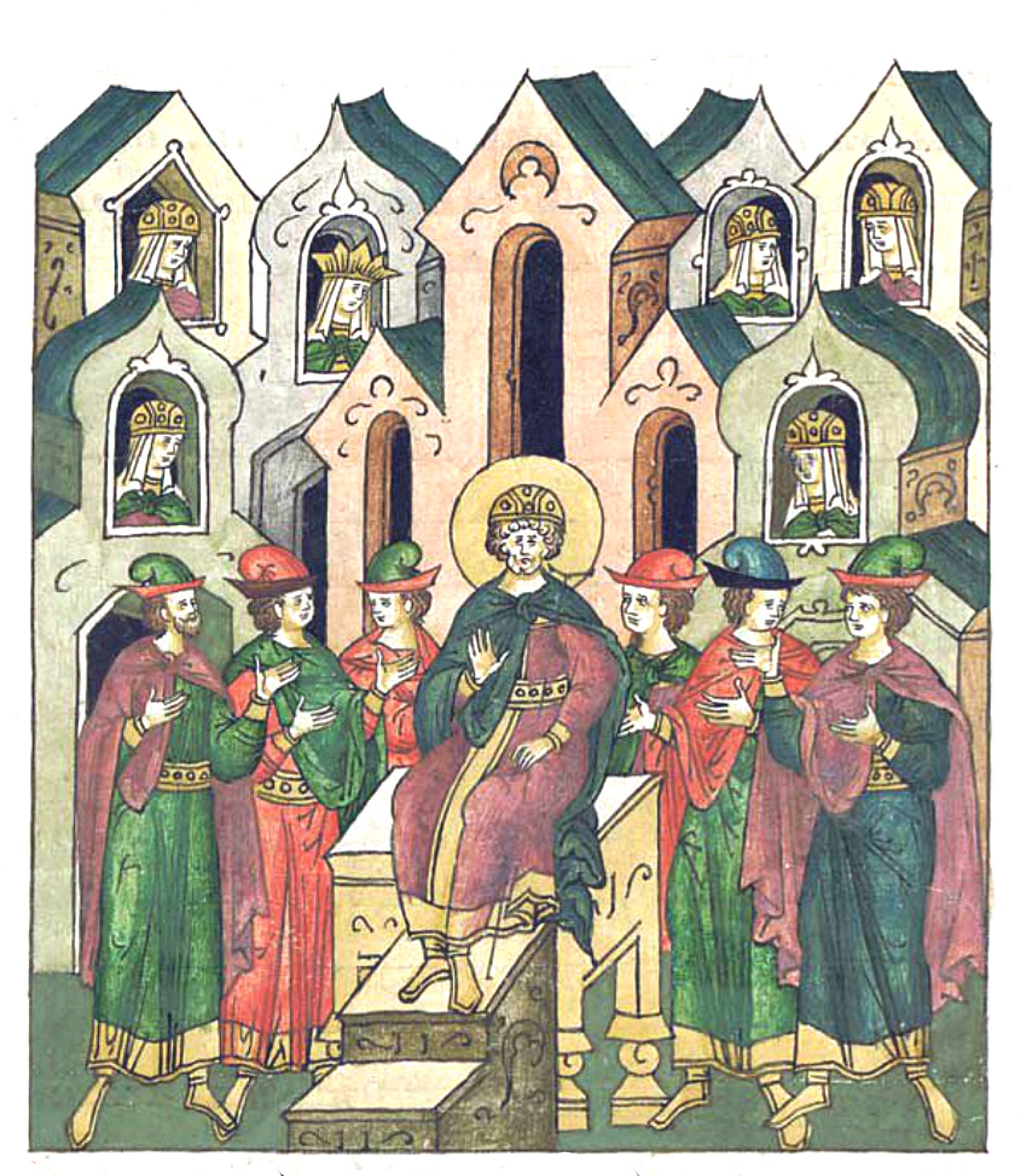
- Born: Hebron
- House: House of David
- Father: David
- Mother: Haggith

According to 2 Samuel, Adonijah (Hebrew: אֲדֹנִיָּה, ’Ǎḏōnīyyā; "my lord is Yah") was the fourth son of King David. His mother was Haggith as recorded in the book of 2 Samuel 3:4. Adonijah was born at Hebron during the long conflict between David and the House of Saul. In 1 Kings, he briefly proclaimed himself king of Israel during the terminal illness of his father David, before peacefully ceding the throne to his brother Solomon.

== Life ==
After the death of his elder brothers Amnon and Absalom, Adonijah considered himself the heir-apparent to the throne. He acquired chariots and a large entourage. The king was unaware of this, being as he was "stricken in years" with his health failing him, and was in a different city. (KJV) Adonijah consulted and obtained the support of both the commander of the army Joab and the influential priest Abiathar. However, the priest Zadok, Benaiah (head of the king's bodyguard), Nathan (the court prophet), and others did not side with Adonijah.

In anticipation of his father's imminent death, Adonijah invited his brother princes and the court officials to a solemn sacrifice in order to announce his claim to the throne. Notably, he did not invite Solomon nor any of his supporters. According to the Jewish Study Bible, by excluding Solomon, Adonijah demonstrates his awareness that he is in effect usurping the throne.

Assuming that Adonijah will soon move to eliminate any rivals or opposition, Nathan warns Bathsheba, Solomon's mother, and counsels her to remind the king of a previous promise to make Solomon his successor. Lillian R. Klein finds in Nathan's promise to confirm Bathsheba's statement a suggestion that her words may have required verification, and that there was no earlier definite promise in Solomon's favor. However KJV confirms in 1 Chronicles 29 and 2 Samuel 15 that David had indeed promised that Solomon would be anointed King.

However, Adonijah was supplanted by Solomon through the influence of Bathsheba, and through the diplomacy of the prophet Nathan. They induced David to give orders that Solomon should immediately be proclaimed and admitted to the throne, which David agreed.

After receiving word that Solomon had been crowned king, Adonijah's supporters quickly fled, while Adonijah took refuge at the altar. He later received a pardon for his conduct from Solomon on the condition that he showed himself a worthy man (1 Kings 1:5–53). Afterwards, Adonijah asked to marry Abishag from Shunem, who served his father David on his deathbed, and asks Bathsheba to plead with the king on his behalf 1 Kings 2:13–18. The text does not indicate if Bathsheba was aware of Adonijah's possible duplicity or not, only that she brought the request, which would bring death to Solomon's most dangerous rival, before her son (1 Kings 2:19–21). Solomon, interpreting it as a second attempt to gain the throne, denied authorization for such an engagement and Adonijah was subsequently put to death (1 Kings 2:13–25).

== Interpretation of Adonijah's death ==
In some interpretations, the death of Adonijah was the last of the punishments meted out on David by God for his adultery with Bathsheba and the murder of her husband Uriah. As David demanded that the rich man of Nathan's parable restore the lamb fourfold (2 Sam 12:6), so four of his sons had to die as reparation for the murder: Bathsheba's baby son (2 Sam 12:18), Amnon (2 Sam 13:29), Abshalom (2 Sam 18:14–15) and, after David's death, Adonijah.

== See also ==
- Identity of Araunah
