= Raising of the son of the woman of Shunem =

Miracle of the Hebrew prophet Elisha

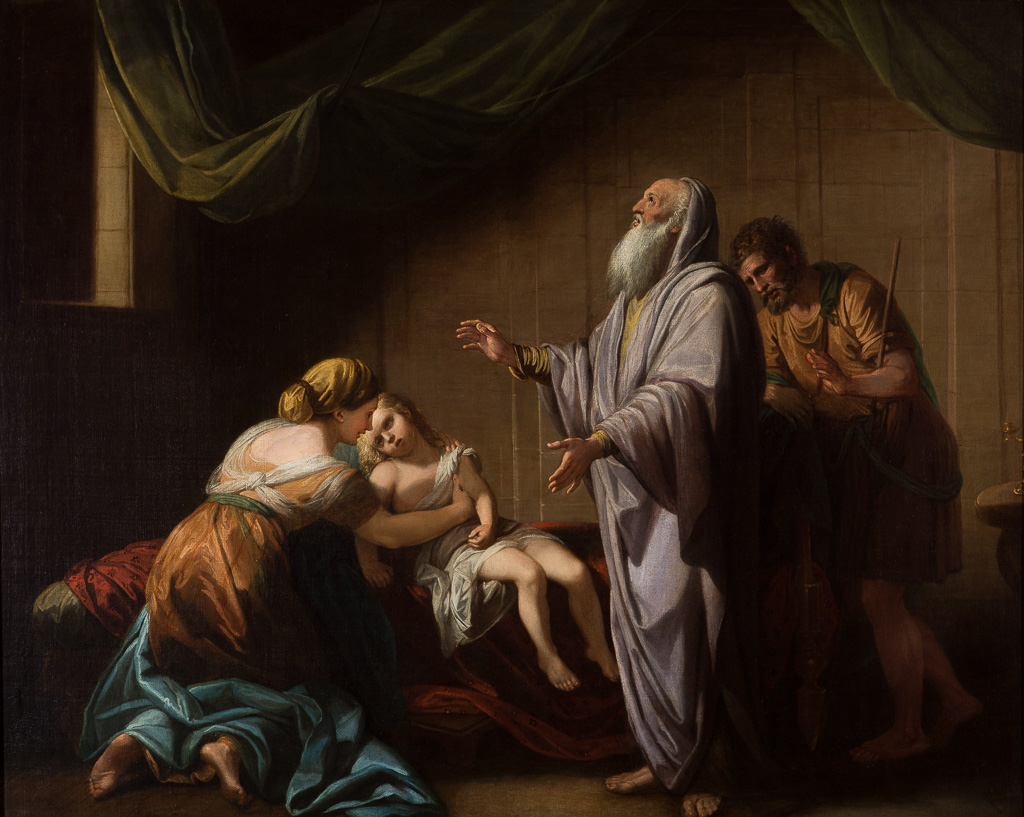
Elisha raises son of the woman of Shunem, Benjamin West, 1765.

The raising of the son of the woman of Shunem is a miracle by Elisha narrated in the Hebrew Bible, 2 Kings 4:

2 Kings 4: 32 When Elisha came into the house, he saw the child lying dead on his bed. 33 So he went in and shut the door behind the two of them and prayed to the Lord. 34 Then he went up and lay on the child, putting his mouth on his mouth, his eyes on his eyes, and his hands on his hands. And as he stretched himself upon him, the flesh of the child became warm. 35 Then he got up again and walked once back and forth in the house, and went up and stretched himself upon him. The child sneezed seven times, and the child opened his eyes.

The story begins at 2 Kings 4:8, and is demarcated from the previous story by Elisha's arrival in Shunem, and by a change in heroine — from the widow of the son of the prophets (4:1-7) to the rich woman of Shunem.

The story reflects the story of Elijah raising of the son of the widow of Zarephath.
