= Ludwik Solski =

Polish stage actor and theatre director

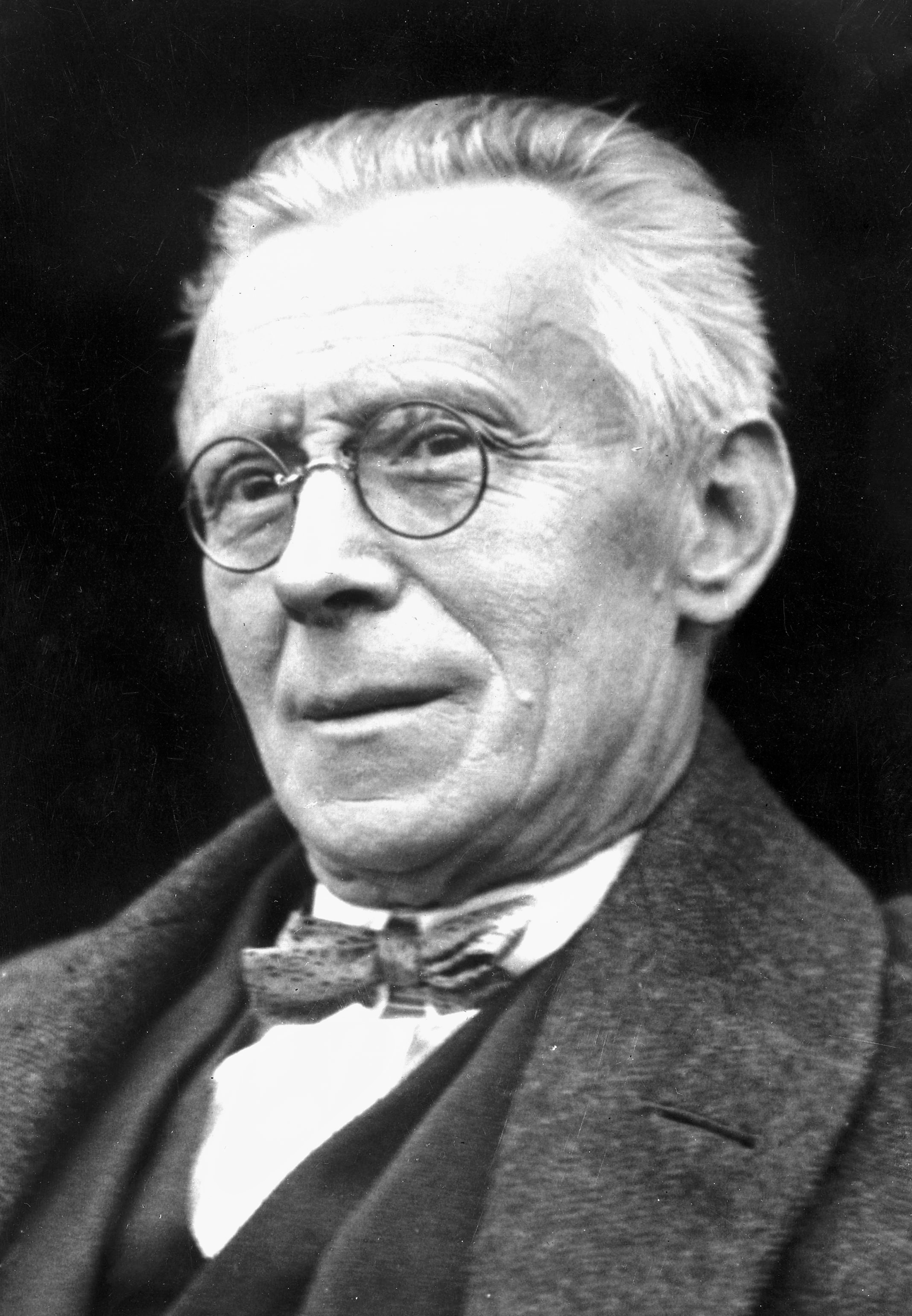
- Solski in the 30s
- Born: 20 January 1855; Gdów (now Kuyavian-Pomeranian Voivodeship, Poland)
- Died: 19 December 1954 (aged 99); Kraków, Polish People's Republic
- Occupation: Actor
- Years active: 1876-1954
- Spouse: Irena Solska

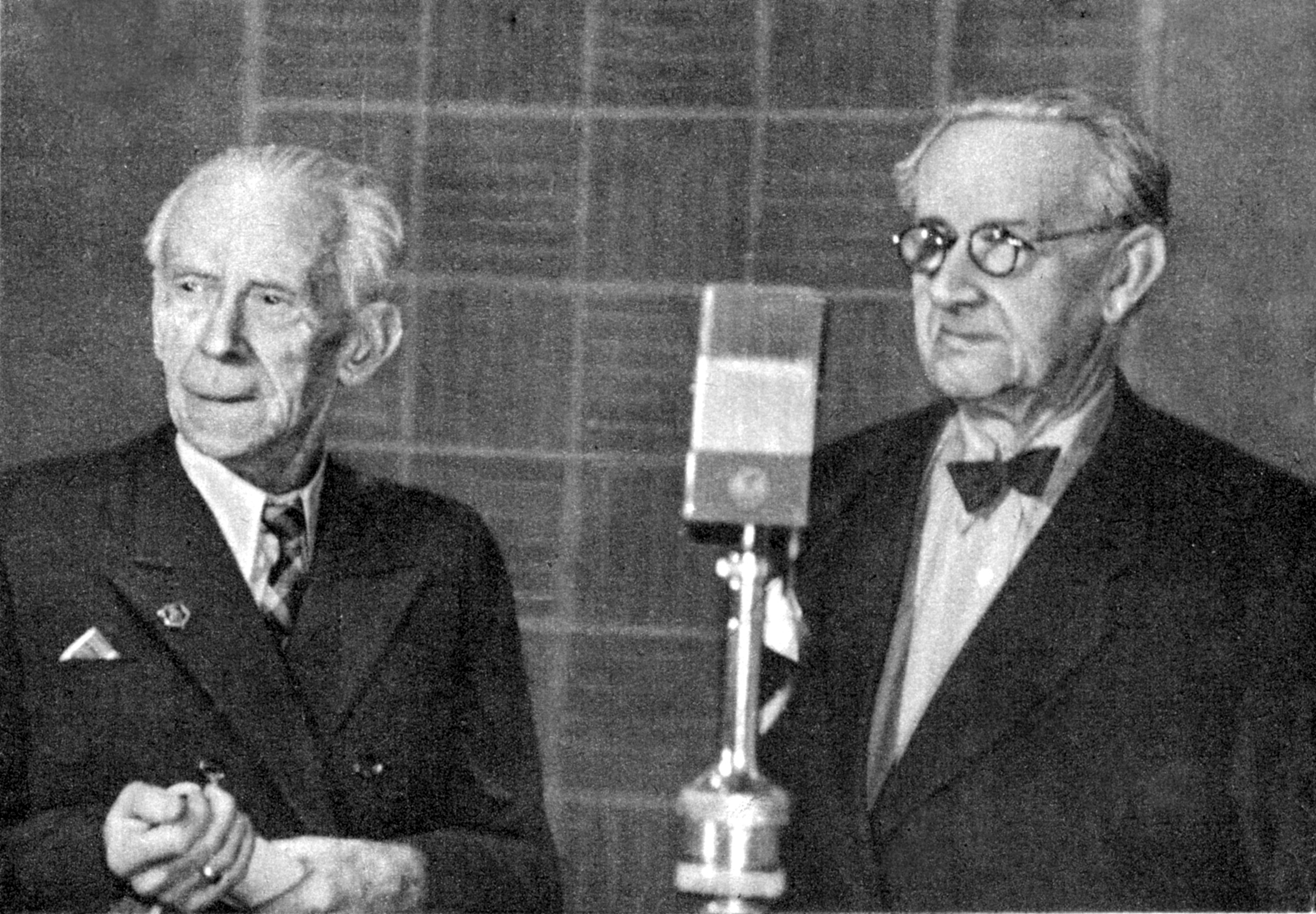
Ludwik Solski and Aleksander Zelwerowicz at the Polish Radio in 1949

Ludwik Solski (20 January 1855 - 19 December 1954), born Ludwik Napoleon Karol Sosnowski, was a Polish stage actor and theatre director. From his stage debut in 1876 until his death (his last performance took place six months after his 99th birthday) he played in nearly a thousand roles. He was married to the Polish actress and director Irena Solska.

Between 1905 and 1913 he was the director-general of the municipal theatre in Kraków. He worked in various Polish theatres in the period 1918-1939 and returned to Kraków in 1944.

During the bombing of Warsaw in September 1939, Solski's entire apartment in a tenement house at Aleje Jerozolimskie 31 was destroyed. In the apartment there were numerous works of art, including paintings by Józef Mehoffer, Julian Fałat and Piotr Stachiewicz, and 12 paintings by Stanisław Wyspiański.

After the fall of the Warsaw Uprising, Ludwik Solski was to be evacuated together with the Infant Jesus Hospital (Polish: Szpital Kliniczny Dzieciątka Jezus), where he was staying. Zygmunt Augustyński, a pre-war journalist and one of the main activists of the RGO, enabled him to leave the hospital at 55 Mokotowska Street. The way in Mokotowska Street the artist marched by foot with his wife and maid, in the company of Augustyński, who thanks to his knowledge of German, was supposed to protect them from the insistence of German patrols. Upon reaching the destination, 89-year-old Solski, having climbed onto a truck via improvised stairs, turned to Augustyński and said: "Mr. Zygmunt, it was the most difficult role in my life".

Since 1954 he has been the patron of the Academy for the Dramatic Arts in Kraków.

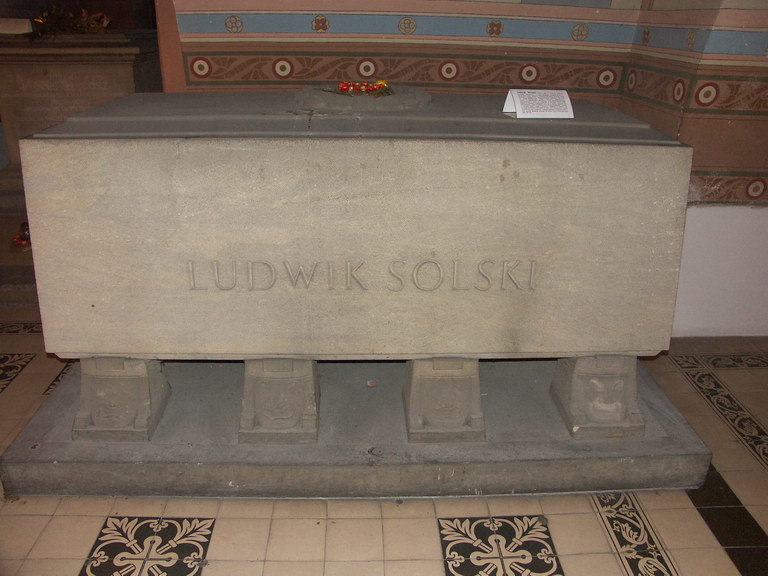
Solski's final resting place, in the Crypt of the Distinguished in the Na Skałce church
