= Shunem =

Village mentioned in the Bible

Coordinates: 32°36′20.28″N 35°20′3.50″E

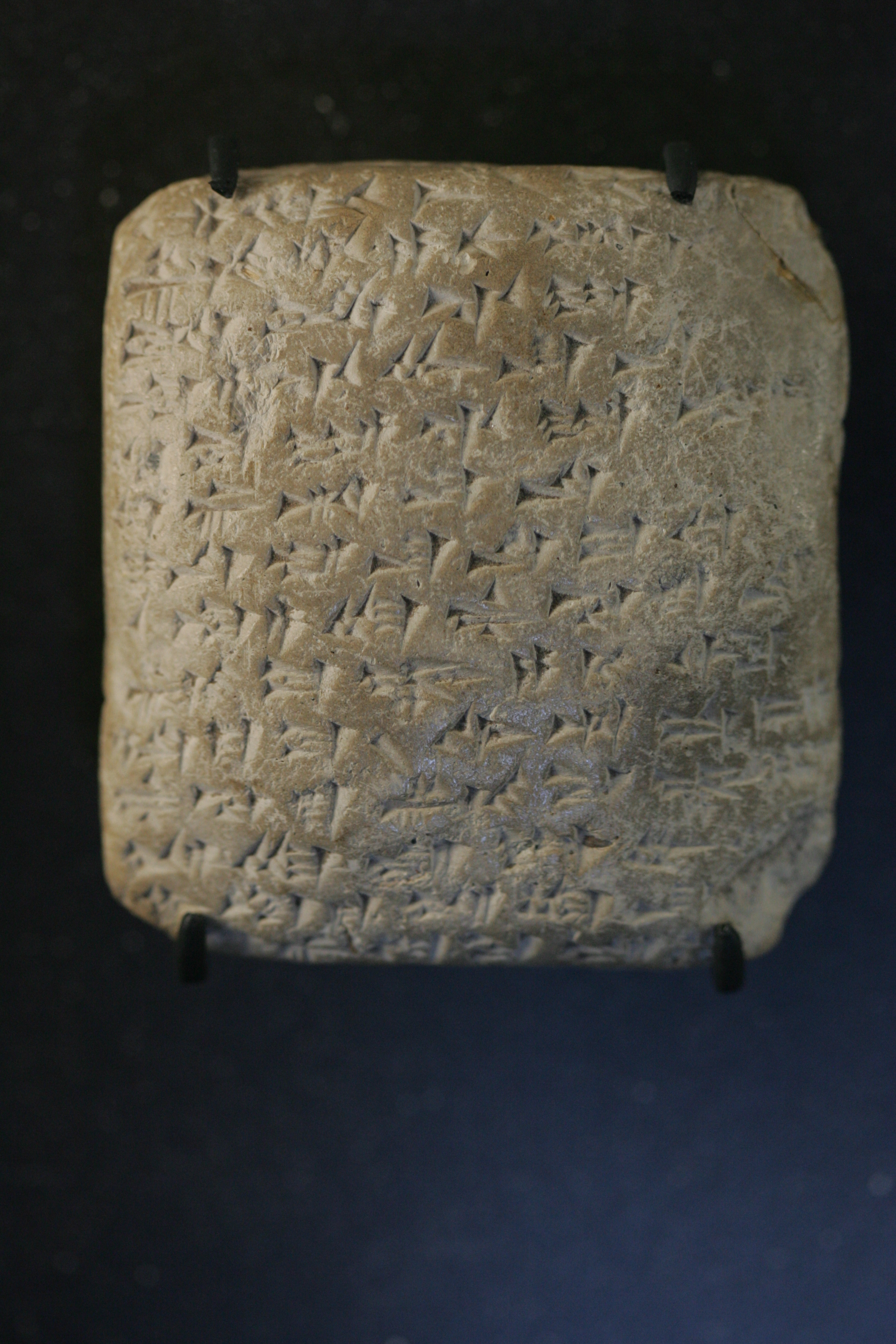
Amarna letter mentioning Shunem

Shunem or Shunaam (Hebrew: שׁוּנֵם Šūnēm; in LXX Ancient Greek: Σουνὰν, romanized: Sounàn) was a small village mentioned in the Bible in the possession of the Tribe of Issachar. It was located near the Jezreel Valley, north of Mount Gilboa (Joshua 19:18).

Shunaam is where the Philistines camped when they fought Saul, the first king of Israel (1 Samuel 28:4). It was the hometown of Abishag, King David's companion in his old age (1 Kings 1:1). The prophet Elisha was hospitably entertained there by a wealthy woman whose deceased son Elisha brought back to life. (2 Kings 4:8)

M8 N35 G1 Aa15 D38 or N37 N35 G1 Aa15 D38 šnꜣmmꜣ(j) in hieroglyphs Era: New Kingdom (1550–1069 BC)	M8 N35 Aa15 D36 M17 G1 N25 šnmꜥꜣ(j)ꜣ in hieroglyphs Era: 3rd Intermediate Period (1069–664 BC)

Shunaam is listed as a town conquered by the pharaohs of Egypt Thutmose III and Shoshenk I.

Shunaam may have been located at the site of the modern village of Sulam.

== See also ==
- Shunamitism
