= Skolimowo =

- Settlement
- Location within Poland
- Coordinates: 54°2′N 19°42′E
- Country: Poland
- Voivodeship: Warmian-Masurian
- County: Elbląg
- Gmina: Pasłęk
- Population: 24
- Website: skolimowo.interia.pl

Skolimowo [skɔliˈmɔvɔ] is a settlement in the administrative district of Gmina Pasłęk, within Elbląg County, Warmian-Masurian Voivodeship, in northern Poland.
