= Abishag =

Biblical figure, servant to King David

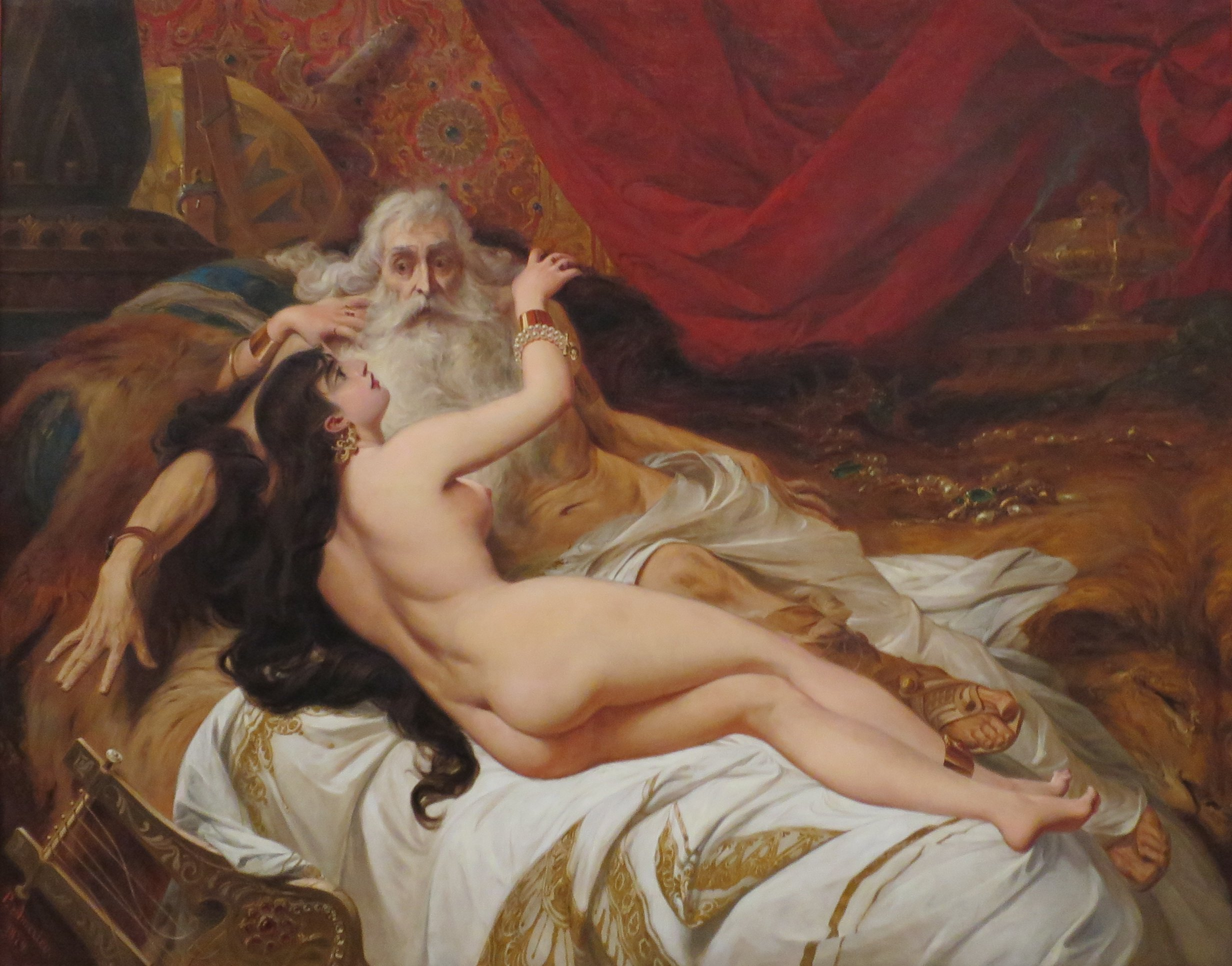
David and Abishag by Pedro Américo, 1879

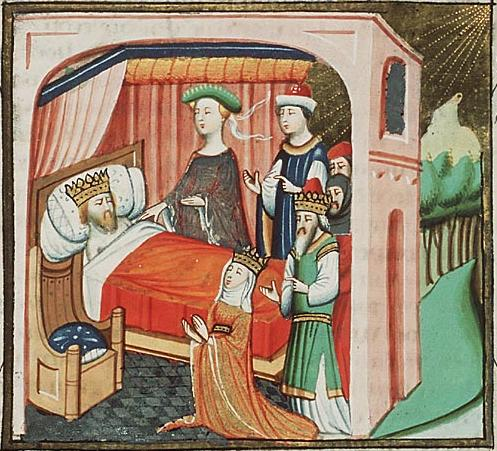
Abishag, Bathsheba, Solomon, and Nathan tend to the aging David, c. 1435.

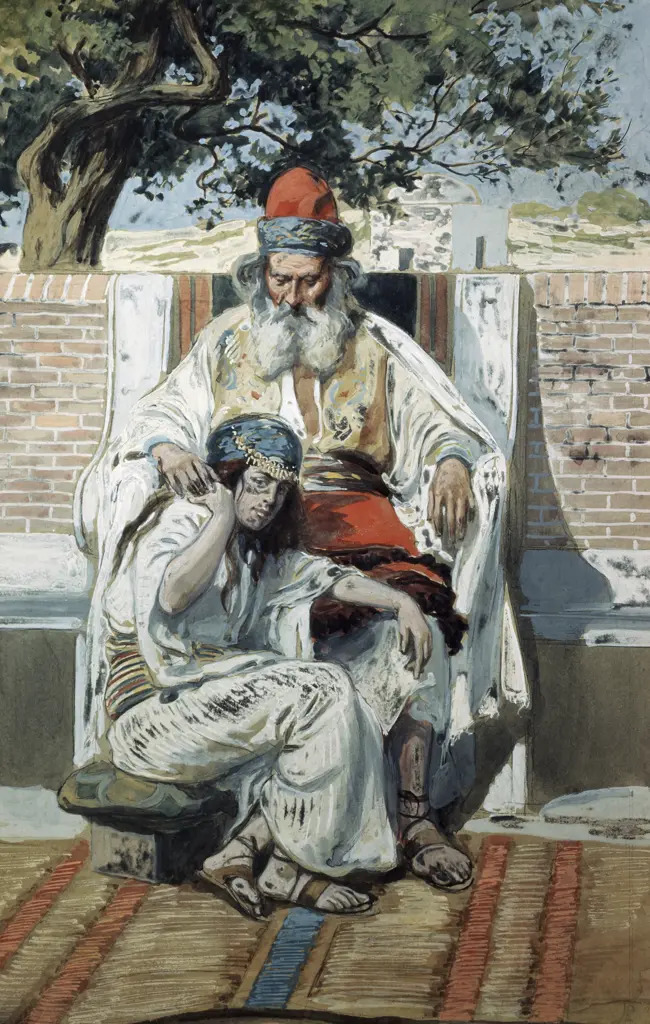
David and Abishag, James Tissot (1836–1902, France), Jewish Museum (Manhattan)

In the Hebrew Bible, Abishag (/ˈæbɪʃæɡ/; Hebrew: אֲבִישַׁג, romanized: ʾăb̲išag̲, lit. 'My Father is a wanderer') was a beautiful young woman of Shunem chosen to be a helper and servant to King David in his old age. Among Abishag's duties was to lie next to David and pass along her body heat and vigor because "they put covers on him, but he could not get warm".

== Biblical narrative ==
When brought to David, she was a naʿarā (נַעֲרָ֣ה), which indicates youth but not specifically a virgin. However, in the preceding verse (1 Kings 1:2), it specifies that they are looking for a betulah (בְתוּלָ֔ה) 'a virgin' to warm David. 1 Kings 1:4 states that David did not engage in sexual intercourse with her. Nonetheless, there are elements of Jewish exegetical tradition which maintain that David engaged in anal sex with Abishag and he was not totally impotent. It is speculated that King David engaged in a multicoital act of intercourse with his wife Bathsheba in his old age precisely to prove his continued virility.

After David's death, Adonijah, David's fourth and eldest surviving son, persuaded Bathsheba, King Solomon's mother, to entreat the king to permit him to marry Abishag. Solomon suspected in this request an aspiration to the throne, since Abishag was considered David's concubine, and so ordered Adonijah's assassination in 1 Kings 2:17–25. In the earlier story of Absalom's rebellion, it is noted that having sexual relations with the former king's concubine is a way of proclaiming oneself to be the new king. Adonijah may have asked to marry her at the suggestion of his mother.

Some scholars point to the possibility that Abishag is the female protagonist in the Song of Songs.

Later Jewish midrashic and Christian traditions paid little attention to Abishag's role. Rashi refers to her as a meḥomemet, or "warmer". Modern commentaries and translators have variously described her as a "housekeeper", "hot-water bottle", "heating pad", "attendant" or "bedfellow", though she is twice referred to as a soḵeneṯ in the text of Kings. This term, when applied to a man (soḵēn), is often translated "administrator" or "palace steward", as in Isaiah 22:15, leading some to believe she may have had a broader role and responsibilities. Other commentaries describe her role as being a nurse to the frail King David.

Abishag's experiences have provided inspiration for contemporary writers including Rainer Maria Rilke, Itzik Manger, Louise Gluck and Shirley Kaufman. The story is referred to allegorically at the end of the first part of the final volume (The Cross or in the original Norwegian, Korset) of Kristin Lavransdatter by Sigrid Undset. Abishag (referred as "Abishag the Shunammite") also appears in Joseph Heller's novel God Knows, as the caretaker for King David in his final years. Abishag's name, although not her story, is invoked to begin Robert Frost's poem "Provide, Provide."

== See also ==
- Shunamitism
