= 1 Samuel 16 =

First Book of Samuel chapter

- ← chapter 15 chapter 17 →
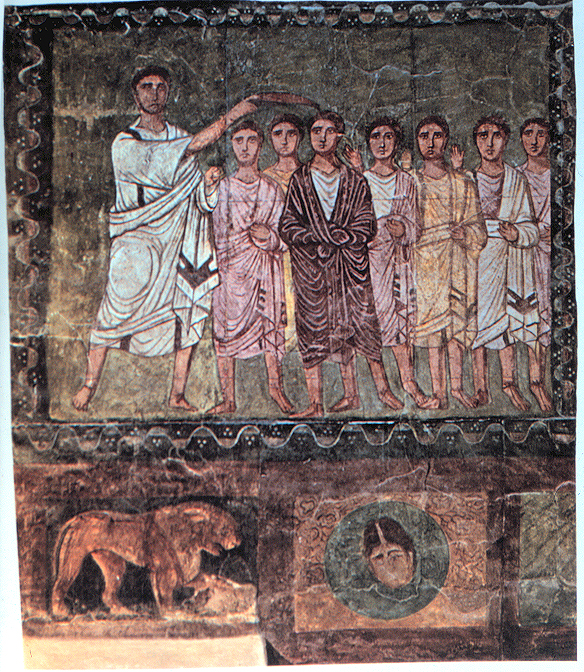
- "Samuel Anoints David" from a synagogue interior wood panel at Dura-Europos, Syria (from second/third century CE).
- Book: First book of Samuel
- Hebrew Bible part: Nevi'im
- Order in the Hebrew part: 3
- Category: Former Prophets
- Christian Bible part: Old Testament
- Order in the Christian part: 9

1 Samuel 16 is the sixteenth chapter of the First Book of Samuel in the Old Testament of the Christian Bible or the first part of the Books of Samuel in the Hebrew Bible. According to Jewish tradition the book was attributed to the prophet Samuel, with additions by the prophets Gad and Nathan, but modern scholars view it as a composition of a number of independent texts of various ages from c. 630–540 BCE. This chapter contains the anointing of David by Samuel and David's early service for Saul. This is within a section comprising 1 Samuel 16 to 2 Samuel 5 which records the rise of David as the king of Israel.

== Text ==
This chapter was originally written in the Hebrew language. It is divided into 23 verses.

=== Textual witnesses ===
Some early manuscripts containing the text of this chapter in Hebrew are of the Masoretic Text tradition, which includes the Codex Cairensis (895), Aleppo Codex (10th century), and Codex Leningradensis (1008). Fragments containing parts of this chapter in Hebrew were found among the Dead Sea Scrolls including 4Q52 (4QSam^{b}; 250 BCE) with extant verses 1–11.

Extant ancient manuscripts of a translation into Koine Greek known as the Septuagint (originally was made in the last few centuries BCE) include Codex Vaticanus (B; $\mathfrak{G}$^{B}; 4th century) and Codex Alexandrinus (A; $\mathfrak{G}$^{A}; 5th century). (Note: The whole book of 1 Samuel is missing from the extant Codex Sinaiticus.)

== Places ==
Places mentioned in this chapter
- Bethlehem
- Gibeah
- Ramah

== Analysis ==
The section comprising 1 Samuel 16 to 2 Samuel 5 is known as the "History of David's Rise", with David as the central character, within which 1 Samuel 16:1 to 2 Samuel 1:27 form an independent unit with a central theme of "the decline of Saul and the rise of David". The part emphasizes that David is God's chosen king (1 Samuel 16:1–13; 'the LORD was with him' 1 Samuel 16:18; 18:14), but Saul was still king and David was careful not to take over the kingdom from God's anointed (1 Samuel 24:6; 26:9), even it is shown throughout that David was under blessing, while Saul was under curse. The narrative stresses that David did not come to power by killing Saul's family, and that Saul and his son Jonathan knew that David was the chosen successor; Jonathan even assisted David by his own virtual abdication, while Saul tried to oppress David due to jealousy.

== Samuel Anoints David as King of Israel (16:1–13) ==
The narrative of David's anointing bears some similarities to Saul's own election to the kingship:

- YHWH alone chooses a king (the Hebrew verb bahar, "to choose", is used in both accounts; 1 Samuel 10:24; 16:8–10), so both Saul and David did not come to the throne by chance or force.
- Saul was from the smallest clan of the smallest tribe of Israel, whereas David was the youngest of Jesse's sons.
- David was not present for examination and had to be brought from the fields, whereas Saul had to be brought from among the baggage.

Despite the similarities, this narrative the major difference introduced by is that Saul was rejected but David chosen, explicitly shown in verse 13 with the 'transfer of YHWH's spirit from Saul to David and the abandonment of Saul to a malevolent spirit'.

=== Verse 1 ===
Now the Lord said to Samuel, "How long will you mourn for Saul, seeing I have rejected him from reigning over Israel? Fill your horn with oil, and go; I am sending you to Jesse the Bethlehemite. For I have provided Myself a king among his sons."

- "Horn with oil": The anointing oil was placed in an animal horn as container, in contrary to the "flask of oil" used to anoint Saul in 1 Samuel 9. The use of oil for anointing was found in some reports from ancient Near East, but the anointing from a "horn of oil" was found uniquely in ancient Syria-Palestine, such as a depiction in an Egyptian tomb (from 1420 BCE) of a Syria-Palestinian envoy carrying a horn of oil, and an Ugaritic text referring to the anointing of king Amuru's daughter by pouring oil from a horn on her head.
- "Provided": literally "seen" in Hebrew.

=== Verse 2 ===
And Samuel said, "How can I go? If Saul hears it, he will kill me."
And the Lord said, "Take a heifer with you and say, ‘I have come to sacrifice to the Lord.'"

After Saul's rejection (verse 1), Samuel was fear of Saul's reprisal, so he had to have a pretence of going to Bethlehem to anoint Saul's replacement.

- "With you": Hebrew: "in your hand."

=== Verse 7 ===
But the Lord said to Samuel, “Do not look on his appearance or on the height of his stature, because I have rejected him. For the Lord sees not as man sees. For man looks on the outward appearance, but the Lord looks on the heart.”

Although David was handsome (verse 12), it is emphasized that God does not look on the 'outward appearance', as it was precisely for that reason that Eliab, who was as tall as Saul, was rejected.

== David in Saul's service (16:10–35) ==
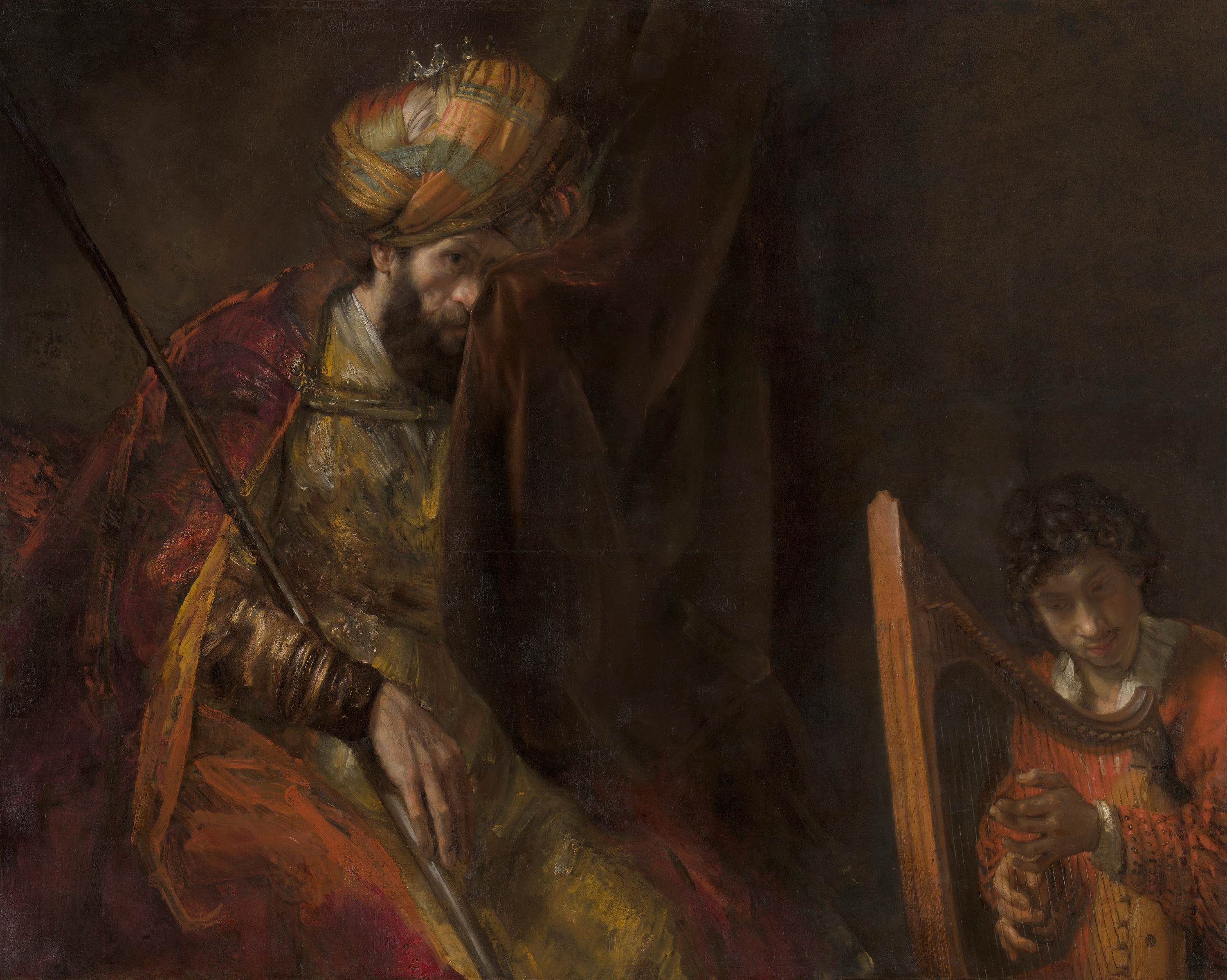
"Saul and David" by Rembrandt (between 1650 and 1670)

Not long after David was anointed and endowed with YHWH's spirit, Saul became unwell (verse 14), which turned out to be an opportunity for David to enter the court. David was brought in because of his skill in playing music (verse 18), but inside the court he had palace training that would be useful for his future. Apparently David's military prowess also attracted the attention of Saul, whose policy was to enlist all capable men in his fight against the Philistines (1 Samuel 14:52), so David additionally was appointed as Saul's armor-bearer. Furthermore, David was said to have good intellectual judgement, was a man of presence (verse 18), and on top of those, 'YHWH is with him'. Verse 21 even states that 'Saul loved him' ('Saul' was explicitly mentioned in the Greek Septuagint, instead of ambiguous subject in Masoretic Text), which later turned to a love-hate relationship between the two. An important statement in verse 23: Saul was entirely in David's hands, and David took that responsibility seriously.

=== Verse 14 ===
Now the Spirit of the Lord had turned away from Saul, and an evil spirit from the Lord tormented him.

- "Evil spirit": The Hebrew word translated “evil” here may refer to (1) the character of the spirit or to (2) its effect upon Saul. If the former, it could be translated as "demonic spirit", but if the latter, another translation option might be “a mischief-making spirit”. An evil spirit of the God was sent to sow discord between Abimelech and the people of Shechem (Judges 9:23); here the evil spirit would lead to discord between Saul and David.

=== Verse 18 ===
Then one of the servants answered and said,

"Look, I have seen a son of Jesse the Bethlehemite, who is skillful in playing, a mighty man of valor, a man of war, prudent in speech, and a handsome person; and the Lord is with him."

- "Prudent in speech": in Hebrew literally "discerning of word".
- "A handsome person": in Hebrew literally "a man of form".

== See also ==
- Abinadab
- Anointing
- Bethlehem
- Eliab
- Harp
- Jesse the Bethlehemite
- Israelites
- Ramah
- Shammah
- Tribe of Judah
- Related Bible parts: Exodus 17, Numbers 14, Deuteronomy 25, Judges 3, Judges 6, Judges 7, 1 Samuel 10, 1 Samuel 11, 1 Samuel 12, 1 Samuel 13

== Sources ==
=== Commentaries on Samuel ===
- Auld, Graeme (2003). "1 & 2 Samuel". In James D. G. Dunn and John William Rogerson (ed.). Eerdmans Commentary on the Bible. Eerdmans. ISBN 9780802837110.
- Bergen, David T. (1996). 1, 2 Samuel. B&H Publishing Group. ISBN 9780805401073.
- Chapman, Stephen B. (2016). 1 Samuel as Christian Scripture: A Theological Commentary. Wm. B. Eerdmans Publishing Company. ISBN 978-1467445160.
- Evans, Paul (2018). Longman, Tremper (ed.). 1-2 Samuel. The Story of God Bible Commentary. Zondervan Academic. ISBN 978-0310490944.
- Gordon, Robert (1986). I & II Samuel, A Commentary. Paternoster Press. ISBN 9780310230229.
- Hertzberg, Hans Wilhelm (1964). I & II Samuel, A Commentary (trans. from German 2nd edition 1960 ed.). Westminster John Knox Press. p. 19. ISBN 978-0664223182.
- Tsumura, David Toshio (2007). The First Book of Samuel. Eerdmans. ISBN 9780802823595.

=== General ===
- Breytenbach, Andries (2000). "Who Is Behind The Samuel Narrative?". In Johannes Cornelis de Moor and H.F. Van Rooy (ed.). Past, Present, Future: the Deuteronomistic History and the Prophets. Brill. ISBN 9789004118713.
- Coogan, Michael David (2007). Coogan, Michael David; Brettler, Marc Zvi; Newsom, Carol Ann; Perkins, Pheme (eds.). The New Oxford Annotated Bible with the Apocryphal/Deuterocanonical Books: New Revised Standard Version, Issue 48 (Augmented 3rd ed.). Oxford University Press. ISBN 978-0195288810.
- Fitzmyer, Joseph A. (2008). A Guide to the Dead Sea Scrolls and Related Literature. Grand Rapids, MI: William B. Eerdmans Publishing Company. ISBN 9780802862419.
- Halley, Henry H. (1965). Halley's Bible Handbook: an abbreviated Bible commentary (24th (revised) ed.). Zondervan Publishing House. ISBN 0-310-25720-4.
- Hayes, Christine (2015). Introduction to the Bible. Yale University Press. ISBN 978-0300188271.
- Jones, Gwilym H. (2007). "12. 1 and 2 Samuel". In Barton, John; Muddiman, John (eds.). The Oxford Bible Commentary (first (paperback) ed.). Oxford University Press. pp. 196–232. ISBN 978-0199277186.
- Klein, R.W. (2003). "Samuel, books of". In Bromiley, Geoffrey W (ed.). The International Standard Bible Encyclopedia. Eerdmans. ISBN 9780802837844.
- Knight, Douglas A (1995). "Chapter 4 Deuteronomy and the Deuteronomists". In James Luther Mays, David L. Petersen and Kent Harold Richards (ed.). Old Testament Interpretation. T&T Clark. ISBN 9780567292896.
- Ulrich, Eugene, ed. (2010). The Biblical Qumran Scrolls: Transcriptions and Textual Variants. Brill.
- Würthwein, Ernst (1995). The Text of the Old Testament. Translated by Rhodes, Erroll F. Grand Rapids, MI: Wm. B. Eerdmans. ISBN 0-8028-0788-7.
