= 1 Chronicles 10 =

First Book of Chronicles, chapter 10

- ← chapter 9 chapter 11 →
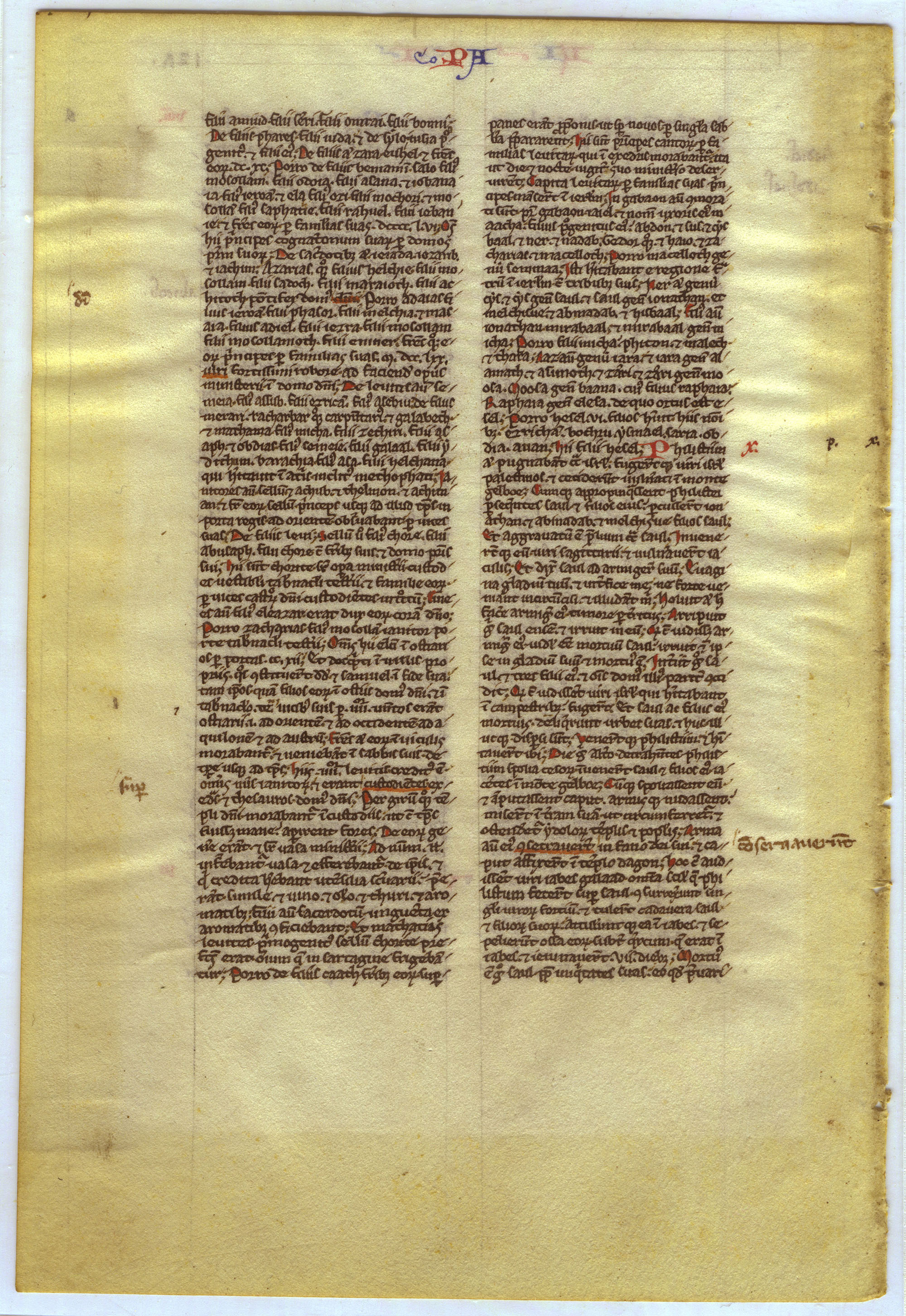
- 1 Chronicles 7:9-10:13. Vellum leaf from c. 1240 France, pearl script.
- Book: Books of Chronicles
- Category: Ketuvim
- Christian Bible part: Old Testament
- Order in the Christian part: 13

1 Chronicles 10 is the tenth chapter of the Books of Chronicles in the Hebrew Bible or the First Book of Chronicles in the Old Testament of the Christian Bible. The book is compiled from older sources by an unknown person or group, designated by modern scholars as "the Chronicler", and had the final shape established in the late fifth or fourth century BCE. This chapter describes Saul's downfall and the reasons for his rejection by God. The whole chapter belongs to the section focusing on the kingship of David (1 Chronicles 9:35 to 29:30).

== Text ==
This chapter was originally written in the Hebrew language. It is divided into 14 verses.

=== Textual witnesses ===
Some early manuscripts containing the text of this chapter in Hebrew are of the Masoretic Text tradition, which includes the Aleppo Codex (10th century), and Codex Leningradensis (1008).

There is also a translation into Koine Greek known as the Septuagint, made in the last few centuries BCE. Extant ancient manuscripts of the Septuagint version include Codex Vaticanus (B; $\mathfrak{G}$^{B}; 4th century), Codex Sinaiticus (S; BHK: $\mathfrak{G}$^{S}; 4th century), Codex Alexandrinus (A; $\mathfrak{G}$^{A}; 5th century) and Codex Marchalianus (Q; $\mathfrak{G}$^{Q}; 6th century).

=== Old Testament references ===
- 1 Chronicles 10:1–14: 1 Samuel 31:1–13.

== Death of Saul and his sons (10:1–10) ==
This section marks the change of form in the Books of Chronicles from a list-based text to a more narrative description based on the historical documents such as the books of Samuel and the books of Kings, and additional materials to provide information on the legitimate Davidic kingdom. It begins with Saul's downfall to theologically link the whole exposition with the Babylonian Exile at the end.

=== Verse 6 ===
So Saul died, and his three sons, and all his house died together.

- Cross reference: 1 Samuel 31:6
- "And all his house": this phrase is used instead of the words 'and his armor-bearer and all his men that same day' in 1 Samuel 31:6 to underline the fact that with Saul's death, his kingdom basically ended. The episode of Ishbaal's brief rule in 2 Samuel 2–4 is considered irrelevant to the Chronicler, although the name is mentioned in the genealogy of Saul (1 Chronicles 8:33–40; 9:39–40).

=== Verse 10 ===
And they put his armour in the house of their gods, and fastened his head in the temple of Dagon.

- Cross reference: 1 Samuel 31:10

According to 1 Samuel 31:10 Saul's armour was placed in the temple of Ashtaroth (Astarte) and his body fastened to the walls of Beth-shan. The Chronicler avoids naming foreign gods, with a few exceptions, such as Dagon.

- "Dagon": god of grain, one of the principal deities of the Philistines. The statue of Dagon lost its head and hands when the Philistines placed the ark of YHWH in a temple of Dagon (1 Samuel 5:4). The fate of Saul was also similar to that of Goliath (1 Samuel 17).

== Burial of Saul (10:11–14) ==
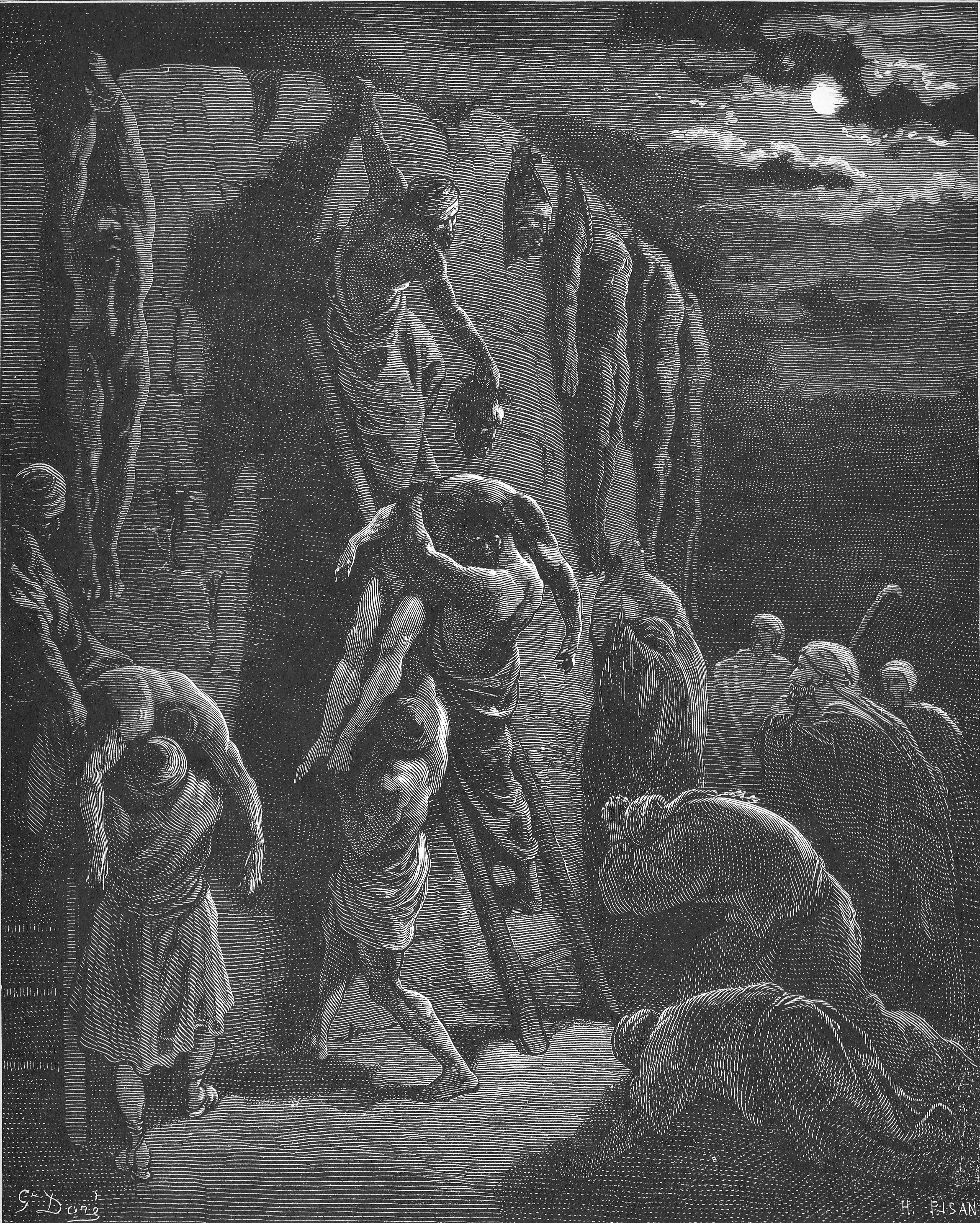
Jabesh-Gileadites recover the bodies of Saul and his sons, Gustave Doré

The narrative of Saul's burial is shorter than the account in 1 Samuel 31:11–13, omitting details such as the all-night walk of the valiant men from Jabesh Gilead to fetch Saul's body and the hanging of the corpses on the city walls of Beth-shan. The Chronicler focuses more on Saul's rejection by God, giving no less than four reasons:

1. Saul's transgression (NKJV/NRSV: 'unfaithfulness'): denoting religious crimes which lead to defeat and exile.
2. He did not keep the word of God, a judgement as declared in Deuteronomy and Psalm 119, for instance. It may refer to crimes committed by Saul as reported in 1 Samuel 13 and 1 Chronicles 15, as the term 'kept' is found in 1 Samuel 13:13–14 and '[YHWH's] word' in 1 Samuel 15 (passim).
3. He consulted a medium, an accusation which contains a pun as "Saul" (Hebrew: שָׁא֗וּל) and "consult" ("enquire, inquire, ask"; Hebrew: שָׁאַל) are made up of the same consonants in Hebrew. This refers to Saul's visit to the witch of Endor (1 Samuel 28).
4. He did not seek the Lord, emphasizing the Chronicler's general attitude towards God.

=== Verse 12 ===
All the valiant men arose and took away the body of Saul and the bodies of his sons, and brought them to Jabesh. And they buried their bones under the oak in Jabesh and fasted seven days.

- Cross reference: 1 Samuel 31:12–13

The brave action of the men, marching from Jabesh-Gilead to Beth-Shan and back (about 13 miles (21 km) one way), recalls the high point of Saul's leadership at the beginning of his reign when he saved the people of Jabesh-Gilead from foreign attacks (1 Samuel 11).

=== Verse 14 ===
But he did not inquire of the Lord; therefore He killed him, and turned the kingdom over to David the son of Jesse.

- "Turned the kingdom over": The kingdom of Israel is 'at God's disposal', so the choice of kings belongs to God (cf. 1 Chronicles 28:2–5; 29:10–12).

== See also ==
- Chronology of the Bible
- David and Jonathan
- House of Saul
- Jabesh-Gilead
- Related Bible parts: 1 Samuel 11, 1 Samuel 13, 1 Samuel 14, 1 Samuel 15, 1 Samuel 28, 1 Samuel 31, 2 Samuel 1, 1 Chronicles 28, 1 Chronicles 29

== Sources ==
- Ackroyd, Peter R (1993). "Chronicles, Books of". In Metzger, Bruce M; Coogan, Michael D (eds.). The Oxford Companion to the Bible. Oxford University Press. pp. 113–116. ISBN 978-0195046458.
- Bennett, William (2018). The Expositor's Bible: The Books of Chronicles. Litres. ISBN 978-5040825196.
- Coogan, Michael David (2007). Coogan, Michael David; Brettler, Marc Zvi; Newsom, Carol Ann; Perkins, Pheme (eds.). The New Oxford Annotated Bible with the Apocryphal/Deuterocanonical Books: New Revised Standard Version, Issue 48 (Augmented 3rd ed.). Oxford University Press. ISBN 9780195288810.
- Endres, John C. (2012). First and Second Chronicles. Liturgical Press. ISBN 9780814628447.
- Evans, Paul (2018). Longman, Tremper (ed.). 1-2 Samuel. The Story of God Bible Commentary. Zondervan Academic. ISBN 978-0310490944.
- Hill, Andrew E. (2003). First and Second Chronicles. Zondervan. ISBN 9780310206101.
- Mabie, Frederick (2017). "I. The Chronicler's Genealogical Survey of All Israel". In Longman III, Tremper; Garland, David E (eds.). 1 and 2 Chronicles. The Expositor's Bible Commentary. Zondervan. pp. 267–308. ISBN 978-0310531814.
- Mathys, H. P. (2007). "14. 1 and 2 Chronicles". In Barton, John; Muddiman, John (eds.). The Oxford Bible Commentary (first (paperback) ed.). Oxford University Press. pp. 267–308. ISBN 978-0199277186.
- Tuell, Steven S. (2012). First and Second Chronicles. Westminster John Knox Press. ISBN 978-0664238650.
- Würthwein, Ernst (1995). The Text of the Old Testament. Translated by Rhodes, Erroll F. Grand Rapids, MI: William B. Eerdmans. ISBN 0-8028-0788-7.
