= 1 Samuel 15 =

First Book of Samuel chapter

- ← chapter 14 chapter 16 →
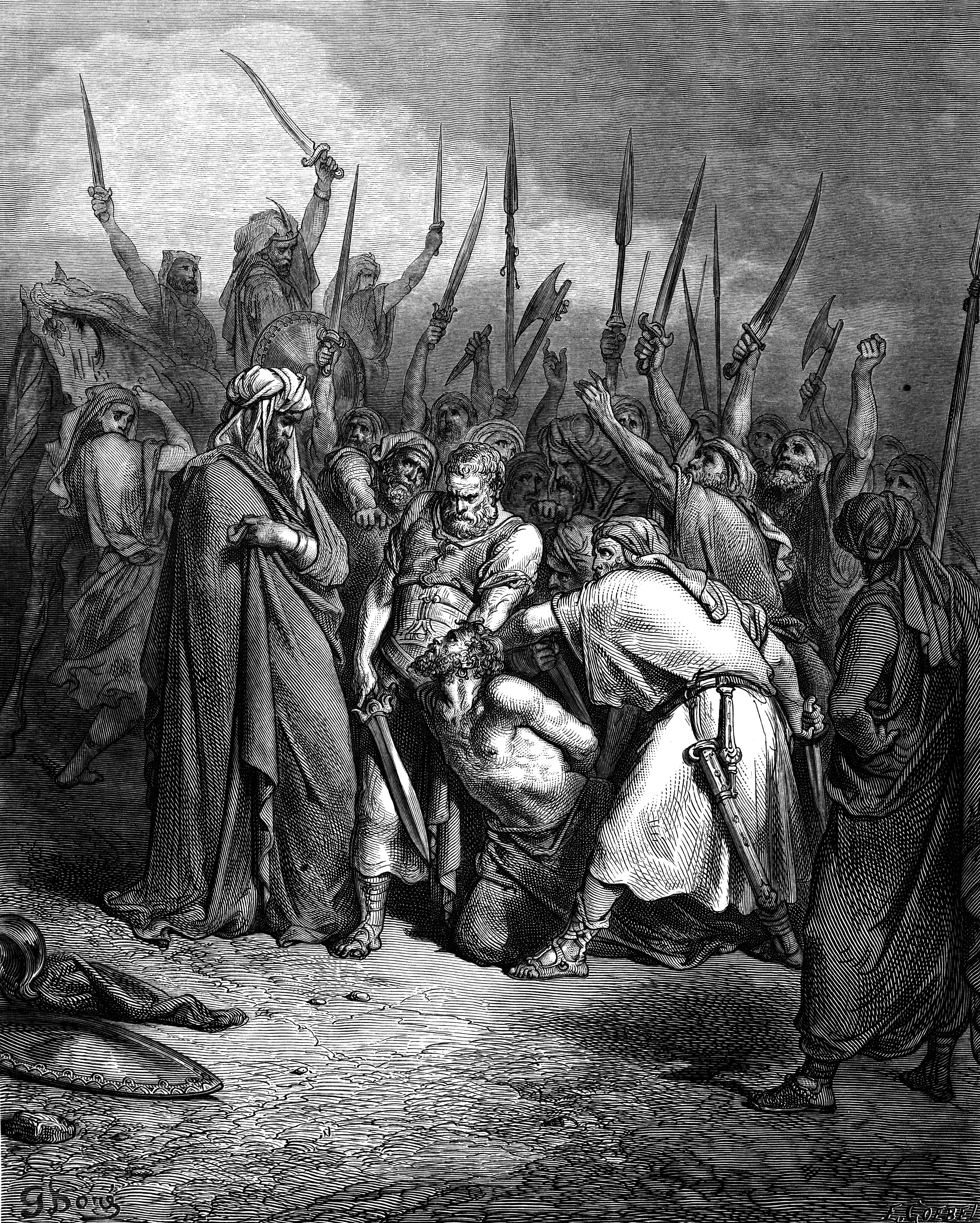
- "The Death of Agag", illustration by Gustave Doré.
- Book: First book of Samuel
- Hebrew Bible part: Nevi'im
- Order in the Hebrew part: 3
- Category: Former Prophets
- Christian Bible part: Old Testament
- Order in the Christian part: 9

1 Samuel 15 is the fifteenth chapter of the First Book of Samuel in the Old Testament of the Christian Bible or the first part of the Books of Samuel in the Hebrew Bible. According to Jewish tradition the book was attributed to the prophet Samuel, with additions by the prophets Gad and Nathan, but modern scholars view it as a composition of a number of independent texts of various ages from c. 630–540 BCE. This chapter contains Saul's disobedience in dealing with the Amalekites. This is within a section comprising 1 Samuel 7–15 which records the rise of the monarchy in Israel and the account of the first years of King Saul.

== Text ==
This chapter was originally written in the Hebrew language. It is divided into 35 verses.

=== Textual witnesses ===
Some early manuscripts containing the text of this chapter in Hebrew are of the Masoretic Text tradition, which includes the Codex Cairensis (895), Aleppo Codex (10th century), and Codex Leningradensis (1008). Fragments containing parts of this chapter in Hebrew were found among the Dead Sea Scrolls including 4Q51 (4QSam^{a}; 100–50 BCE) with extant verses 20–21, 24–32 and 4Q52 (4QSam^{b}; 250 BCE) with extant verses 16–18.

Extant ancient manuscripts of a translation into Koine Greek known as the Septuagint (originally was made in the last few centuries BCE) include Codex Vaticanus (B; $\mathfrak{G}$^{B}; 4th century) and Codex Alexandrinus (A; $\mathfrak{G}$^{A}; 5th century). (Note: The whole book of 1 Samuel is missing from the extant Codex Sinaiticus.)

== Places ==
Places mentioned in this chapter
- Gibeah
- Ramah

== Analysis ==
God through Samuel commanded Saul to lead genocidal war against the Amalekites, as punishment for their attacks on the Israelites on their way from Egypt (verses 1–3, cf. Exodus 17:8–16; Deuteronomy 25:17–19). When Saul did not completely fulfill the order, Samuel spoke an oracle of judgement to Saul (verses 17–31), a similar prophetic attitude as in 8:1–22 and 13:8–15, but here the rejection of Saul is final and absolute (verses 28–29) and 'parabolically confirmed by the accidental tearing of Samuel's robe when Saul made his last desperate supplication' (verse 27). The rejection is spoken in rhythmic form in verses 21–23, contrasting Saul's sacrifice and obedience (cf. Isaiah 1:11–15; Hosea 6:6; Amos 5:21–24; Micah 6:6–8) and declaring that he who rejected God's word has been rejected, following a preliminary warning in 13:13 (cf. 12:14). Saul's guilt was described in the selection of words for his action: disobedience (verse 19), doing evil (verse 19), rebellion (verse 23), stubbornness (verse 23), rejection of God's word (verse 23), as Saul admitted himself that what he did was a sin and transgression (verse 24). Relations between Samuel and Saul were then broken off (verses 34–35), as the cycle of Samuel-Saul narratives is completed; the next section consists of a Saul–David cycle.

== Saul's partial obedience in the mission against the Amalekites (15:1–9) ==
Saul as God's anointed has been given a clear mission from God, that Samuel spoke in detail, perhaps to avoid 'miscommunications' in previous commandments (cf. 1 Samuel 10:8; 1 Samuel 13), and to assure no misunderstanding in the execution. The mission is to "totally destroy" the Amalekites, a practice called herem in Hebrew or "the ban" in English, where no prisoner should be taken and all spoil should be destroyed. This is as divine punishment from God as a vengeance of the attacks by the Amalekites, a descendant of Esau, to the Israelites during wilderness wandering out of Egypt (Exodus 17:8–13) and after the Israelites were in Canaan (Numbers 14:43, 45; Judges 3:13; 6:3–5, 33; 7:10, 12), so that YHWH would "completely blot out the name of Amalek from under heaven" (Exodus 17:14; cf. Deuteronomy 25:17–19). As the things 'devoted to destruction' exclusively belong to YHWH, so the violation of the ban was handled seriously: those who kept something 'under the ban' would themselves put 'under the ban' or to be destroyed (cf. Joshua 7:1, 2:24–26). Against this clear order of YHWH, Saul spared Agag, the king of the Amalek and the best of the animals (verse 9), partially as a 'trophy of war' fitting to his plan for a 'monument in his own honor' in Carmel (verse 12).

=== Verse 6 ===
Then Saul said to the Kenites, "Go, depart; go down from among the Amalekites, lest I destroy you with them. For you showed kindness to all the people of Israel when they came up out of Egypt." So the Kenites departed from among the Amalekites.

- The "Kenites" were a tribe related to Jethro, Moses’ father-in-law, the priest of Midian (Exodus 3:1; Judges 1:16), an offshoot from the Midianites. Jethro and his son Hobab (Exodus 18; Numbers 10:29-32) accompanied the Israelites on their march as far as Jericho (Judges 1:16), but seemingly ever wandering about without a settled home. For some reasons, they broke up into small tribes, some living in the wilderness of Judah (Judges 1:16), others settling far to the north in territory of Naphtali (Judges 4:11, 17), others among the rocks of Arabia Petraea, and here some dwelt among the Amalekites in the desert to the south of Judah. They are mentioned again in 1 Samuel 27:10 and 1 Samuel 30:29, as the friends of Israel. Some famous persons among the Kenites was the killer of Sisera, Jael, whose husband Heber had migrated into northern Palestine (Judges 4:11); and the Rechabites (1 Chronicles 2:55), who long preserved the nomad habits of their ancestors (Jeremiah 35:7-10).
- "I destroy you": could be translated from Masoretic Text אֹסִפְךָ, ('osifeka, "I am gathering you", from the root אָסַף, ['asaf]) or Syriac Peshitta and Latin Vulgate which assume a reading אֶסְפָךְ, ('esfak, “I sweep you away,” from the root סָפָה, [safah]).

== God rejects Saul as king of Israel (15:10–35) ==
After Saul disobeyed God's command, God told Samuel of His regret making Saul a king. The Hebrew root word nhm for "regret" was used 4 times in this chapter (among English Bible translations, ESV consistently renders it as "regret" whereas others use "change of mind" or "repent"). Samuel reacted with 'anger' to God for changing His mind about Saul and 'cries' out all night long. This has a parallel in the account of Jonah who also wished that God would not change His mind on Nineveh: after Jonah 'preach against' Nineveh (Jonah 1:2), prophesying its destruction due to its wickedness, the people of the city repented, so God 'changed His mind' (Hebrew: nhm) and did not bring the destruction He had threatened (Jonah 3:10). This made Jonah 'angry' to God for changing His mind (Jonah 4:2) about Nineveh.

Samuel confronted Saul who had gone to Carmel to 'set up a monument in his own honor' (verse 12), not a humble king anymore. Saul preemptively said that he had obeyed God's order before being asked (verse 13), but Samuel was already told by God about the truth and could hear the sound of cattle which were spared from destruction. Saul tried to deflect the blame by first directing it subtly to his soldiers ('the soldiers brought them') and by saying that they would be slaughtered in a sacrifice for YHWH (verse 15). Samuel confronted all excuses by pointing out that 'to obey is better than sacrifice' and disobedience 'is like the sin of divination' and arrogance like 'the evil of idolatry' (verses 22–23), so since Saul rejected the word of God, God now rejected him as king (verse 23), not just that his future dynasty was canceled as previously stated. Saul desperately begged Samuel to 'repent' (Hebrew: shub; "come back"/"turning away", could be from God as in Joshua 23:12, Judges 2:17; 8:33, or from sin as in 1 Kings 8:48) with him (verse 25). First, Samuel rejected (verse 26), but when Saul asked again to honor him 'before the elders of his people and before Israel' (verse 30), Samuel decided to 'repent' with Saul, so Saul worshipped the Lord before the people (verse 31), and Samuel righted Saul's wrongdoing by publicly killing Agag (verses 32–35). Following this public show, Samuel and Saul parted ways, never to meet again, although Samuel continued to mourn for Saul (verse 35). At the end, God did give mercy to Saul by not immediately removing him as king.

== Uses ==
=== Music ===
"1 Samuel 15:23" is a song title in the album "The Life of the World to Come" inspired by this verse that was released by the American band The Mountain Goats in 2009.

== See also ==
- Agag
- Amalekites
- Carmel
- Cherem
- Children of Israel
- Gibeah
- Gilgal
- Havilah
- Idolatry
- Israelites
- Kenites
- Ramah
- Tribe of Judah
- Witchcraft
- Related Bible parts: Exodus 17, Numbers 14, Deuteronomy 25, Judges 3, Judges 6, Judges 7, 1 Samuel 10, 1 Samuel 11, 1 Samuel 12, 1 Samuel 13

== Sources ==
=== Commentaries on Samuel ===
- Auld, Graeme (2003). "1 & 2 Samuel". In James D. G. Dunn and John William Rogerson (ed.). Eerdmans Commentary on the Bible. Eerdmans. ISBN 978-0-8028-3711-0.
- Bergen, David T. (1996). 1, 2 Samuel. B&H Publishing Group. ISBN 978-0-8054-0107-3.
- Chapman, Stephen B. (2016). 1 Samuel as Christian Scripture: A Theological Commentary. Wm. B. Eerdmans Publishing Company. ISBN 978-1-4674-4516-0.
- Evans, Paul (2018). Longman, Tremper (ed.). 1-2 Samuel. The Story of God Bible Commentary. Zondervan Academic. ISBN 978-0-310-49094-4.
- Gordon, Robert (1986). I & II Samuel, A Commentary. Paternoster Press. ISBN 978-0-310-23022-9.
- Hertzberg, Hans Wilhelm (1964). I & II Samuel, A Commentary (trans. from German 2nd edition 1960 ed.). Westminster John Knox Press. p. 19. ISBN 978-0-664-22318-2.
- Tsumura, David Toshio (2007). The First Book of Samuel. Eerdmans. ISBN 978-0-8028-2359-5.

=== General ===
- Breytenbach, Andries (2000). "Who Is Behind The Samuel Narrative?". In Johannes Cornelis de Moor and H.F. Van Rooy (ed.). Past, Present, Future: the Deuteronomistic History and the Prophets. Brill. ISBN 9789004118713.
- Coogan, Michael David (2007). Coogan, Michael David; Brettler, Marc Zvi; Newsom, Carol Ann; Perkins, Pheme (eds.). The New Oxford Annotated Bible with the Apocryphal/Deuterocanonical Books: New Revised Standard Version, Issue 48 (Augmented 3rd ed.). Oxford University Press. ISBN 978-0-19-528881-0.
- Fitzmyer, Joseph A. (2008). A Guide to the Dead Sea Scrolls and Related Literature. Grand Rapids, MI: William B. Eerdmans Publishing Company. ISBN 978-0-8028-6241-9.
- Halley, Henry H. (1965). Halley's Bible Handbook: an abbreviated Bible commentary (24th (revised) ed.). Zondervan Publishing House. ISBN 0-310-25720-4.
- Hayes, Christine (2015). Introduction to the Bible. Yale University Press. ISBN 978-0-300-18827-1.
- Jones, Gwilym H. (2007). "12. 1 and 2 Samuel". In Barton, John; Muddiman, John (eds.). The Oxford Bible Commentary (first (paperback) ed.). Oxford University Press. pp. 196–232. ISBN 978-0-19-927718-6.
- Klein, R.W. (2003). "Samuel, books of". In Bromiley, Geoffrey W (ed.). The International Standard Bible Encyclopedia. Eerdmans. ISBN 978-0-8028-3784-4.
- Knight, Douglas A (1995). "Chapter 4 Deuteronomy and the Deuteronomists". In James Luther Mays, David L. Petersen and Kent Harold Richards (ed.). Old Testament Interpretation. T&T Clark. ISBN 978-0-567-29289-6.
- Ulrich, Eugene, ed. (2010). The Biblical Qumran Scrolls: Transcriptions and Textual Variants. Brill.
- Würthwein, Ernst (1995). The Text of the Old Testament. Translated by Rhodes, Erroll F. Grand Rapids, MI: Wm. B. Eerdmans. ISBN 0-8028-0788-7.
