= 1 Samuel 31 =

First Book of Samuel chapter

- ← chapter 30 2 Samuel 1 →
- The pages containing the Books of Samuel (1 & 2 Samuel) in Leningrad Codex (1008 CE).
- Book: First book of Samuel
- Hebrew Bible part: Nevi'im
- Order in the Hebrew part: 3
- Category: Former Prophets
- Christian Bible part: Old Testament
- Order in the Christian part: 9

1 Samuel 31 is the thirty-first (and the last) chapter of the First Book of Samuel in the Old Testament of the Christian Bible or the first part of the Books of Samuel in the Hebrew Bible. Jewish tradition attributes the book to the prophet Samuel, with later additions by the prophets Gad and Nathan; modern scholarship, however, regards it as a compilation of independent texts dated to c. 630–540 BCE. This chapter contains the account of Saul's repeated attempts to kill David. This is within a section comprising 1 Samuel 16 to 2 Samuel 5 which records the rise of David as the king of Israel.

== Text ==
This chapter was originally written in Biblical Hebrew. It is divided into 13 verses.

=== Textual witnesses ===
Some early manuscripts containing the text of this chapter in Biblical Hebrew are of the Masoretic Textual tradition, which includes the Codex Cairensis (895), Aleppo Codex (10th century), and Codex Leningradensis (1008). Fragments containing parts of this chapter in Hebrew were found among the Dead Sea Scrolls including 4Q51 (4QSam^{a}; 100–50 BCE) with extant verses 1–4. Plate XIII of 4Q51 contains traces of verse 13, separated to 2 Samuel 1:1 with an open line.

Extant ancient manuscripts of a translation into Koine Greek known as the Septuagint (originally compiled in the last few centuries BCE) include Codex Vaticanus (B; $\mathfrak{G}$^{B}; 4th century) and Codex Alexandrinus (A; $\mathfrak{G}$^{A}; 5th century). (Note: The whole book of 1 Samuel is missing from the extant Codex Sinaiticus.)

== Places ==
Places mentioned in this chapter
- Bethshan
- Jabesh-Gilead
- Jordan River
- Mount Gilboa

== The death of Saul and his three sons (31:1–10) ==
While David defeated the Amalekites, Saul and his army were defeated by the Philistines, highlighting David's success (with divine guidance and protection) in saving his family and others, compared to Saul's failure, which resulted in the deaths of his family and many others in battle. Toward the end of the battle on Mount Gilboa, Saul's three sons—Jonathan, (Note: IPA: [/jəhoːnaːˈtaːn/], Biblical Hebrew: יְהוֹנָתָן, romanized: yəhônātān) Abinadab, (Note: [/ʔăviːnaːˈdaːḇ/], אֲבִינָדָב, ʾăḇînādāḇ) and Malchishua (Note: [/malˈkiːʃuːaʕ/], מַלְכִּישׁוּעַ, malkîšûaʿ)—were killed, and Saul himself was wounded. He asked his trusted personal armor-bearer to kill him before the Philistines arrived, but out of respect for Saul as YHWH's anointed (Biblical Hebrew: מָשִׁיחַ, romanized: māšîaḥ), the armor-bearer refused, so Saul committed suicide. Saul's dishonorable end was followed by a total defeat of his troops, while other Israelites not in battle (suggesting that Saul did not have all Israel behind him) fled from the neighboring areas, leaving their towns and villages for the Philistines to seize. His body met a disrespectful fate: he was beheaded, his armor was taken into the local temple of Astarte—the chief goddess of Beit She'an (בֵּית שָׁן, bêt šān)—and his body was hanged on the wall of Beit She'an for public display. (1 Chronicles 10:10 states that his head was fastened to the temple of Dagon).

=== Verse 2 ===
Then the Philistines followed hard after Saul and his sons. And the Philistines killed Jonathan, Abinadab, and Malchishua, Saul's sons.

- Abinadab is called "Ishvi" (אִישׁוִי, ʾîšwî) in 1 Samuel 14:49.

=== Verse 4 ===
Then Saul said to his armorbearer, "Draw your sword, and thrust me through with it, lest these uncircumcised men come and thrust me through and abuse me."
But his armorbearer would not, for he was greatly afraid. Therefore Saul took a sword and fell on it.

- "Abuse" also meaning "torture".

== Jabesh-gilead's tribute to Saul (31:11–13) ==
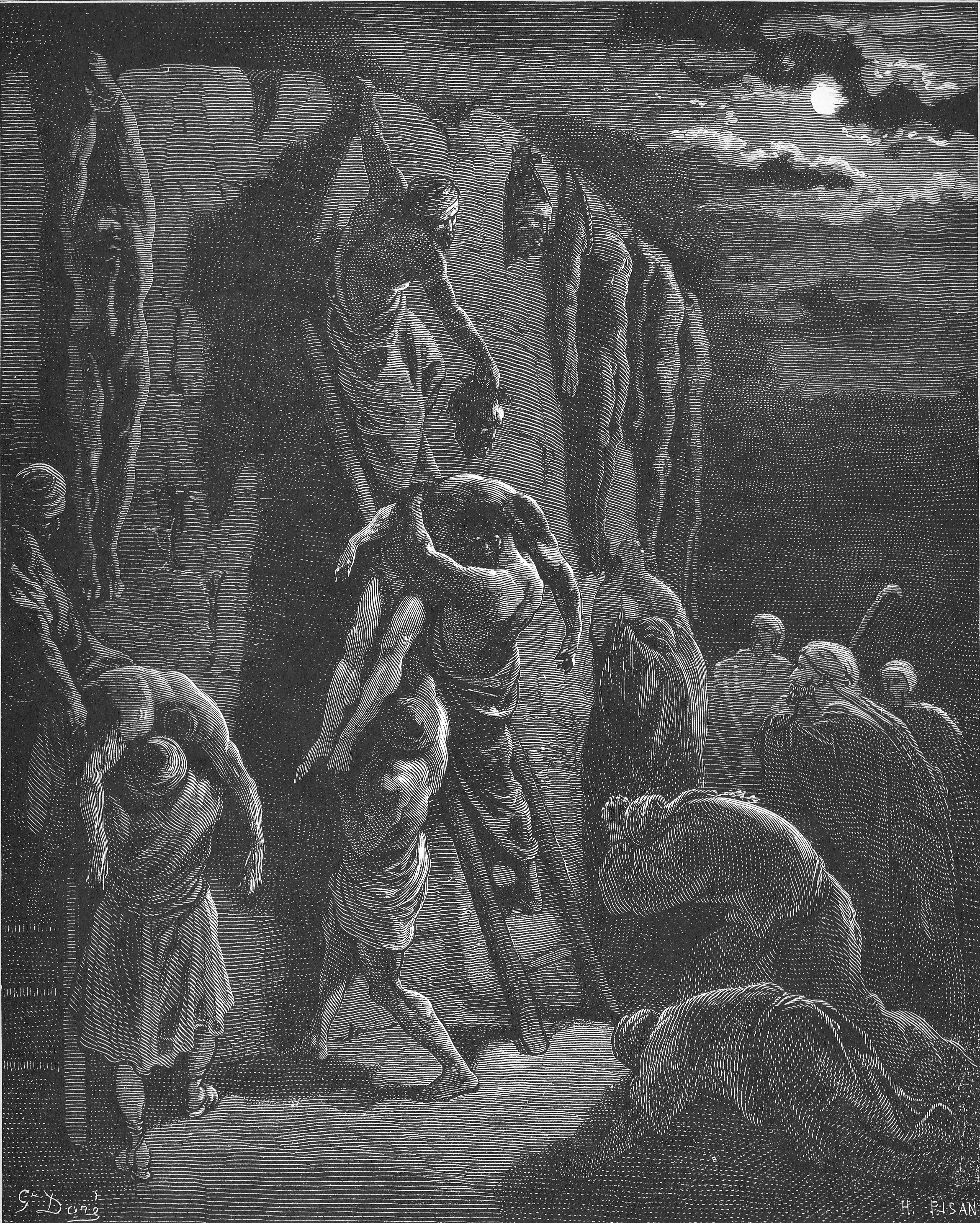
Jabesh-Gileadites recover the bodies of Saul and his sons, Gustave Doré

The men of Jabesh-Gilead (יָבֵשׁ גִּלְעָד, yāvēš gilʿāḏ), remembering Saul's action on their behalf (1 Samuel 11:1–13), came to take the bodies of Saul and his sons for cremation and burial, a more honorable treatment than that of the Philistines to the bodies of Saul and his sons.

=== Verses 12–13 ===
^{12}All the valiant men arose, and went all night, and took the body of Saul and the bodies of his sons from the wall of Bethshan, and came to Jabesh, and burnt them there.
^{13}And they took their bones, and buried them under a tree at Jabesh, and fasted seven days.

The brave action of the men, marching from Jabesh-Gilead to Beit She'an and back—about 13 miles (21 km) one way—recalls the high point of Saul's leadership at the beginning of his reign when he saved the people of Jabesh-Gilead from foreign attacks (1 Samuel 11).

== See also ==
- Abinadab
- Ashtaroth
- Circumcision in cultures and religions
- Fasting
- Israelites
- Jonathan (1 Samuel)
- Melchishua
- Philistines
- Suicide
- Related Bible parts: 1 Samuel 28, 1 Samuel 29, 2 Samuel 1, 1 Chronicles 10

== Sources ==
=== Commentaries on Samuel ===
- Auld, Graeme (2003). "1 & 2 Samuel". In James D. G. Dunn and John William Rogerson (ed.). Eerdmans Commentary on the Bible. Eerdmans. ISBN 9780802837110.
- Bergen, David T. (1996). 1, 2 Samuel. B&H Publishing Group. ISBN 9780805401073.
- Chapman, Stephen B. (2016). 1 Samuel as Christian Scripture: A Theological Commentary. Wm. B. Eerdmans Publishing Company. ISBN 978-1467445160.
- Evans, Paul (2018). Longman, Tremper (ed.). 1-2 Samuel. The Story of God Bible Commentary. Zondervan Academic. ISBN 978-0310490944.
- Gordon, Robert (1986). I & II Samuel, A Commentary. Paternoster Press. ISBN 9780310230229.
- Hertzberg, Hans Wilhelm (1964). I & II Samuel, A Commentary (trans. from German 2nd edition 1960 ed.). Westminster John Knox Press. p. 19. ISBN 978-0664223182.
- Tsumura, David Toshio (2007). The First Book of Samuel. Eerdmans. ISBN 9780802823595.

=== General ===
- Breytenbach, Andries (2000). "Who Is Behind The Samuel Narrative?". In Johannes Cornelis de Moor and H.F. Van Rooy (ed.). Past, Present, Future: the Deuteronomistic History and the Prophets. Brill. ISBN 9789004118713.
- Coogan, Michael David (2007). Coogan, Michael David; Brettler, Marc Zvi; Newsom, Carol Ann; Perkins, Pheme (eds.). The New Oxford Annotated Bible with the Apocryphal/Deuterocanonical Books: New Revised Standard Version, Issue 48 (Augmented 3rd ed.). Oxford University Press. ISBN 978-0195288810.
- Fitzmyer, Joseph A. (2008). A Guide to the Dead Sea Scrolls and Related Literature. Grand Rapids, MI: William B. Eerdmans Publishing Company. ISBN 9780802862419.
- Halley, Henry H. (1965). Halley's Bible Handbook: an abbreviated Bible commentary (24th (revised) ed.). Zondervan Publishing House. ISBN 0-310-25720-4.
- Hayes, Christine (2015). Introduction to the Bible. Yale University Press. ISBN 978-0300188271.
- Jones, Gwilym H. (2007). "12. 1 and 2 Samuel". In Barton, John; Muddiman, John (eds.). The Oxford Bible Commentary (first (paperback) ed.). Oxford University Press. pp. 196–232. ISBN 978-0199277186.
- Klein, R.W. (2003). "Samuel, books of". In Bromiley, Geoffrey W (ed.). The International Standard Bible Encyclopedia. Eerdmans. ISBN 9780802837844.
- Knight, Douglas A (1995). "Chapter 4 Deuteronomy and the Deuteronomists". In James Luther Mays, David L. Petersen and Kent Harold Richards (ed.). Old Testament Interpretation. T&T Clark. ISBN 9780567292896.
- Ulrich, Eugene, ed. (2010). The Biblical Qumran Scrolls: Transcriptions and Textual Variants. Brill.
- Würthwein, Ernst (1995). The Text of the Old Testament. Translated by Rhodes, Erroll F. Grand Rapids, MI: Wm. B. Eerdmans. ISBN 0-8028-0788-7.
