= 1 Samuel 14 =

First Book of Samuel chapter

- ← chapter 13 chapter 15 →
- The pages containing the Books of Samuel (1 & 2 Samuel) in Leningrad Codex (1008 CE).
- Book: First book of Samuel
- Hebrew Bible part: Nevi'im
- Order in the Hebrew part: 3
- Category: Former Prophets
- Christian Bible part: Old Testament
- Order in the Christian part: 9

1 Samuel 14 is the fourteenth chapter of the First Book of Samuel in the Old Testament of the Christian Bible or the first part of the Books of Samuel in the Hebrew Bible. According to Jewish tradition the book was attributed to the prophet Samuel, with additions by the prophets Gad and Nathan, but modern scholars view it as a composition of a number of independent texts of various ages from c. 630–540 BCE. This chapter contains Saul's actions against the Philistines. This is within a section comprising 1 Samuel 7–15 which records the rise of the monarchy in Israel and the account of the first years of King Saul.

== Text ==
This chapter was originally written in the Hebrew language. It is divided into 52 verses.

=== Textual witnesses ===
Some early manuscripts containing the text of this chapter in Hebrew are of the Masoretic Text tradition, which includes the Codex Cairensis (895), Aleppo Codex (10th century), and Codex Leningradensis (1008). Fragments containing parts of this chapter in Hebrew were found among the Dead Sea Scrolls including 4Q51 (4QSam^{a}; 100–50 BCE) with extant verses 24–25, 28–34, 47–51 and 4Q52 (4QSam^{b}; 250 BCE) with extant verses 41–42.

Extant ancient manuscripts of a translation into Koine Greek known as the Septuagint (originally was made in the last few centuries BCE) include Codex Vaticanus (B; $\mathfrak{G}$^{B}; 4th century) and Codex Alexandrinus (A; $\mathfrak{G}$^{A}; 5th century; only extant verses 10–52). (Note: The whole book of 1 Samuel is missing from the extant Codex Sinaiticus.)

== Places ==
Places mentioned in this chapter
- Gibeah
- Michmash
- Shiloh

== Analysis ==
This chapter gives some detailed narratives on the actions of Saul, 'oscillating between a favorable view and a negative, unfavorable verdict', which in the end 'reinforce the conviction that Saul was not a man after God's heart'. There is a contrast between Saul and his first son, Jonathan, where Saul is depicted as reckless, acting foolishly on one occasion (13:13), interrupted a consultation to rush to battle on another (14:19), and finally endangered the life of his son (14:44), whereas Jonathan is described as 'possessing the characteristics of a charismatic leader, stood in the tradition of those who waged God's battles' and became God's instrument: he held the assumption that 'the LORD will act for us' (verse 6), depended on God's approval of his action (verses 8–12), and attributed the victory to God (verse 23, cf. verse 45).

== The Battle of Michmash (14:1–15) ==
The Philistines camped at Michmash (1 Samuel 13:23) on the north side of the deep ravine, known today in Arabic as Wadi es-Suweinit, whereas the Israelites camped in Geba to the south of the ravine. Jonathan and his armour-bearer bravely clambered up from the ravine through hard-to-climb rock formations, as indicated by their names, Bozez ('slippery one') and Seneh ('thorny one'), and succeeded in defeating a group of Philistine soldiers (verses 1–15).

=== Verse 2 ===
And Saul was sitting in the outskirts of Gibeah under a pomegranate tree which is in Migron. The people who were with him were about six hundred men.

- "The outskirts of Gibeah": Gill suggests that Saul did not dare to fight the Philistines, so he remained in the furthest part of Gibeah, at the greatest distance from the camp of the Philistines, in the strongest part of the city, or deeply entrenched in the outer part of it.
- "Under a pomegranate tree": later Saul was said to sit "under a tamarisk tree in Ramah" (1 Samuel 22:6). The Hebrew word for "pomegranate" is "rimmon", here is meant for the tree as it is an appellative noun, not the "Rock of Rimmon" (Judges 20:45, 47; probably because the form resembles the fruit), which was located on the north-east of Michmash.
- "Migron": means "a precipice", one of the conical or spherical hills which are plenty in the Benjamite territory, and favorable for an encampment, or to observe the motions of the Philistines.

=== Verse 3 ===
And Ahijah, the son of Ahitub, Ichabod’s brother, the son of Phinehas, the son of Eli, the priest of the Lord in Shiloh, was wearing the ephod. But the people did not know that Jonathan had gone.

- "Ahijah": could be the same as Ahimelech the son of Ahitub, the priest at Nob, who would later be a victim of Saul's vengeance (1 Samuel 22:9), as the name Ahijah (“brother of Jah”) and Ahimelech ("brother of the king") may have been the same person ("melech", meaning "king", could be substituted for the divine name "Jah"), but it is also possible that Ahimelech was a brother of Ahijah and his successor in the high priesthood. As an elder brother of Ichabod (1 Samuel 4:21), Ahitub was probably about the same age as Samuel, so his son could have already been high-priest that fifty years or more must have elapsed since the death of Eli.
- "Wearing the ephod": here may not refer to the ordinary priestly vestment of white linen (cf. 1 Samuel 2:18), but to the official garment worn only by a high priest, with a breast-plate of gems as well as "Urim and Thummim", used to make inquiry of the Lord.

== Saul's actions (14:16–52) ==
After Jonathan had caused panic in the Philistine garrison (verse 15), Saul finally brought his troops to engage in battle (verse 20). Believing that it will ensure success, Saul placed an oath on his troops to refrain from eating until evening, a rash act (as noted in verse 24 of the Greek Septuagint version, although not found in the Hebrew Masoretic Text), which would make the troops to be too famished to achieve a complete victory, and even become a threat to Jonathan's life (verses 24–26). Jonathan was unaware of the oath, so he ate some of the plentiful honey available and was refreshed ('his eyes brightened'), but he would face death penalty as the consequences from the oath. This led Jonathan to refer Saul as one who 'has troubled the land' and who had prevented a total victory (verse 30). Being very hungry for respecting the oath of refraining from eating the whole day, the Israel troops seized animals from the spoil, and ate them before carefully draining blood from the meat, as they slaughtered on the ground, not on a stone from where the blood could flow away (verses 33–34). 'Eating with blood' (as in NRSV) was forbidden by Torah (Deuteronomy 12:23–27; Leviticus 19:26). Nonetheless, Saul believed the failure to wipe out the Philistines was due to lack of divine support, so investigation was made by means of a sacred lot to find whose fault it was found. The lot fell to the king's family and specifically with Jonathan. Although Jonathan and Saul were willing to accept the verdict, the Israel soldiers insisted to spare Jonathan's life (verse 44). The account closes with a more positive note on Saul as a successful leader (verses 47–48) and the head of a household (verses 49–51).

== See also ==
- Abiel
- Abner
- Ahijah
- Ahinoam
- Ahimaaz
- Ahitub
- Aijalon
- Amalekites
- Ammon
- Ark of the Covenant
- Children of Israel
- Edom
- Ephod
- Ephraim, Mount
- Geba
- Gibeah
- Ichabod
- Ishui
- Israelites
- Kish
- Kohen
- Melchishua
- Merab
- Michal
- Michmash
- Moab
- Ner
- Philistines
- Phinehas
- Shiloh
- Zobah
- Related Bible parts: Leviticus 19, Deuteronomy 12; 1 Samuel 4, 1 Samuel 9, 1 Samuel 10, 1 Samuel 11, 1 Samuel 12, 1 Samuel 13, 1 Chronicles 9

== Sources ==
=== Commentaries on Samuel ===
- Auld, Graeme (2003). "1 & 2 Samuel". In James D. G. Dunn and John William Rogerson (ed.). Eerdmans Commentary on the Bible. Eerdmans. ISBN 978-0-8028-3711-0.
- Bergen, David T. (1996). 1, 2 Samuel. B&H Publishing Group. ISBN 978-0-8054-0107-3.
- Chapman, Stephen B. (2016). 1 Samuel as Christian Scripture: A Theological Commentary. Wm. B. Eerdmans Publishing Company. ISBN 978-1-4674-4516-0.
- Evans, Paul (2018). Longman, Tremper (ed.). 1-2 Samuel. The Story of God Bible Commentary. Zondervan Academic. ISBN 978-0-310-49094-4.
- Gordon, Robert (1986). I & II Samuel, A Commentary. Paternoster Press. ISBN 978-0-310-23022-9.
- Hertzberg, Hans Wilhelm (1964). I & II Samuel, A Commentary (trans. from German 2nd edition 1960 ed.). Westminster John Knox Press. p. 19. ISBN 978-0-664-22318-2.
- Tsumura, David Toshio (2007). The First Book of Samuel. Eerdmans. ISBN 978-0-8028-2359-5.

=== General ===
- Breytenbach, Andries (2000). "Who Is Behind The Samuel Narrative?". In Johannes Cornelis de Moor and H.F. Van Rooy (ed.). Past, Present, Future: the Deuteronomistic History and the Prophets. Brill. ISBN 9789004118713.
- Coogan, Michael David (2007). Coogan, Michael David; Brettler, Marc Zvi; Newsom, Carol Ann; Perkins, Pheme (eds.). The New Oxford Annotated Bible with the Apocryphal/Deuterocanonical Books: New Revised Standard Version, Issue 48 (Augmented 3rd ed.). Oxford University Press. ISBN 978-0-19-528881-0.
- Fitzmyer, Joseph A. (2008). A Guide to the Dead Sea Scrolls and Related Literature. Grand Rapids, MI: William B. Eerdmans Publishing Company. ISBN 978-0-8028-6241-9.
- Halley, Henry H. (1965). Halley's Bible Handbook: an abbreviated Bible commentary (24th (revised) ed.). Zondervan Publishing House. ISBN 0-310-25720-4.
- Hayes, Christine (2015). Introduction to the Bible. Yale University Press. ISBN 978-0-300-18827-1.
- Jones, Gwilym H. (2007). "12. 1 and 2 Samuel". In Barton, John; Muddiman, John (eds.). The Oxford Bible Commentary (first (paperback) ed.). Oxford University Press. pp. 196–232. ISBN 978-0-19-927718-6.
- Klein, R.W. (2003). "Samuel, books of". In Bromiley, Geoffrey W (ed.). The International Standard Bible Encyclopedia. Eerdmans. ISBN 978-0-8028-3784-4.
- Knight, Douglas A (1995). "Chapter 4 Deuteronomy and the Deuteronomists". In James Luther Mays, David L. Petersen and Kent Harold Richards (ed.). Old Testament Interpretation. T&T Clark. ISBN 978-0-567-29289-6.
- Ulrich, Eugene, ed. (2010). The Biblical Qumran Scrolls: Transcriptions and Textual Variants. Brill.
- Würthwein, Ernst (1995). The Text of the Old Testament. Translated by Rhodes, Erroll F. Grand Rapids, MI: Wm. B. Eerdmans. ISBN 0-8028-0788-7.
