= Battle of Michmash =

Biblical battle fought between Israelites and Philistines

- Part of Later Israelite Campaigns
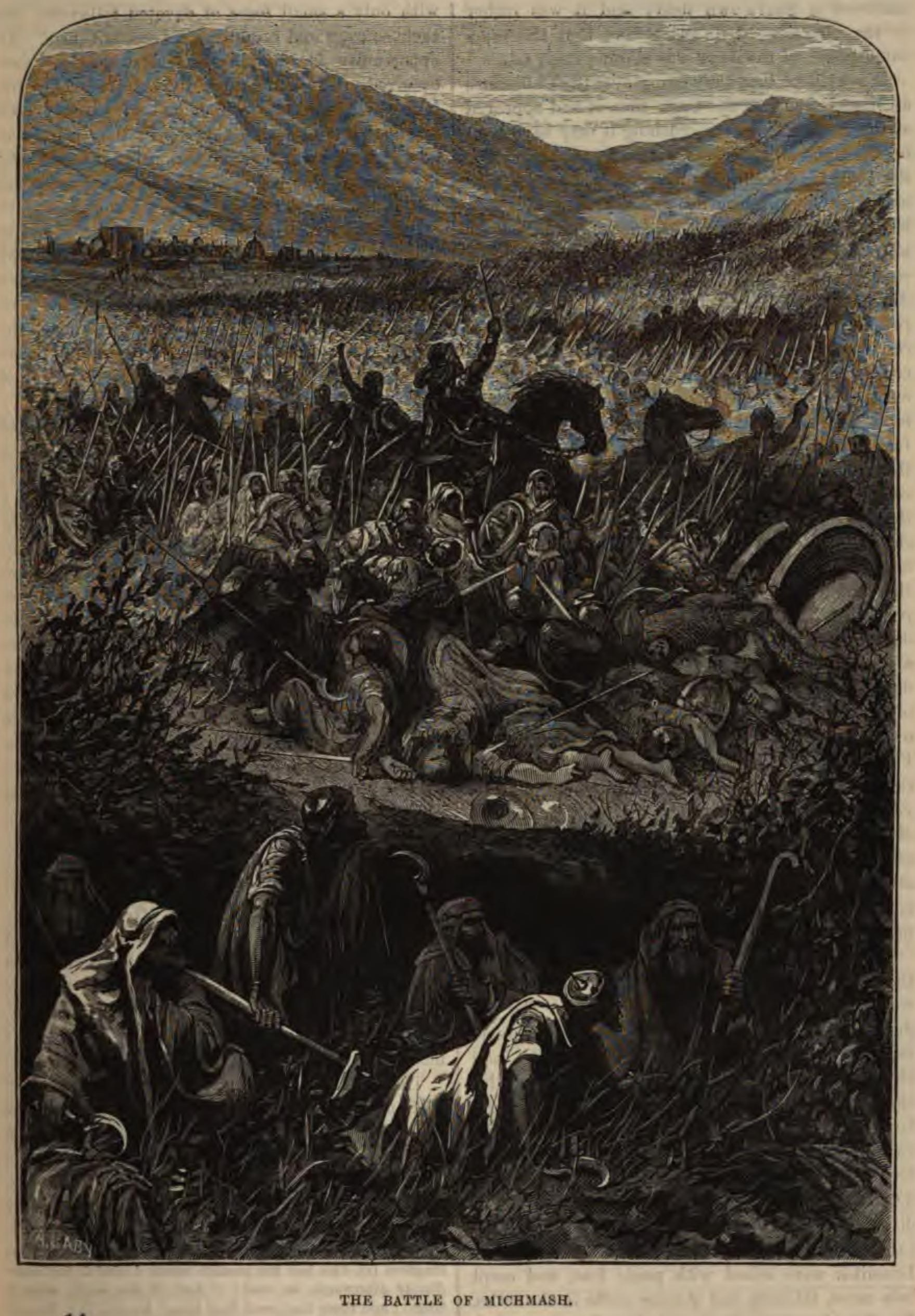
- A. Labyː Battle of Michmash (Cassell's Illustrated Universal History)
Date	c. 1025 BCE
Location	Michmash, United Kingdom of Israel
Result	Israelite victory

Belligerents
United Kingdom of Israel	Philistines

Commanders and leaders
King Saul of Israel; Jonathan	Unknown

Strength
3,000 soldiers and militia men, of which only 600 remained with King Saul	3,000 chariots, carrying 2 men and defended by 3 units of 4 infantrymen each 6,000 cavalry Total: 48,000 soldiers

Casualties and losses
No reliable estimates, but very light	60,000 Killed

According to the Hebrew Bible, the Battle of Michmash (alternate spelling, Michmas) was fought between Israelites under Jonathan, son of King Saul and a force of Philistines at Michmash, a town east of Bethel and south of Migron.

== Strength of combatant armies ==
According to the Bible, Saul's army consisted entirely of infantry, about 3,000 soldiers and militia men. According to Josephus and 1 Samuel 13:2, Saul himself initially retained 2,000 of these as his guard in Bethel while providing Jonathan with 1,000 which he used to take back Gibeah from Philistine rule. Saul kept a standing army of three thousand soldiers after the Battle of Jabesh-Gilead. However, none of the soldiers carried swords or spears with them and had to rely on axes, sickles, mattocks, and plow points as weapons; 1 Samuel 13:19 mentions that "Not a blacksmith could be found in the whole land of Israel, because the Philistines had said, 'Otherwise the Hebrews will make swords or spears!'" and Josephus attributes this to a systematic seizure of such items by the Philistines in the region of Gibeah. According to 1 Samuel 13:21, "the price was 2/3 of a shekel for sharpening plow points and mattocks, and 1/3 of a shekel for sharpening forks and axes." Only King Saul and his son Jonathan were said to have carried a spear and a bronze straight sword between them, though it is also possible that Jonathan was armed with a bow and quiver of arrows as well Josephus however claims that Saul had only an effective combat force of 600 upon his encampment in Gibeah, citing mass desertion as a cause. Josephus also claims that by the end of the battle, the addition of returned deserters and local supporters to the Israelite army swelled its numbers to 10,000, a number far exceeding other claims.

The full strength of the Philistine armies at Michmash has been debated. According to Josephus and the Hebrew text of 1 Samuel 13:5, the Philistines dispatched a force of 30,000 chariots, 6,000 horsemen, and a large number of infantry (specified as 300,000 by Josephus) against King Saul's army, but it is believed that the Philistines supplied way fewer than 30,000 chariots to the battlefield. The actual size and strength of the Philistine army is estimated at over 40,000 men, consisting of 6,000 horsemen and about 3,000 special hamashhith units. Each hamashhith was composed of a chariot carrying 2 men, a charioteer and an archer with javelins, bows, and arrows, and three squads of infantry runners, 4-men each. The infantry runners, also wearing leather breastplates and armed with swords, spears, and round bronze shields, would have numbered more than 30,000 men in total strength. Add in the charioteers and archers mounted in the chariots and the 6,000 horsemen, the Philistines mustered a total of 48,000 soldiers against the Israelites.

== Biblical account of the battle ==
Josephus describes Saul relocating to Gilgal to attempt to rally the local Israelite populace against the Philistines, only to encounter mass desertion to local cave networks or across the Jordan river when the disparity in strength was identified. Saul is then said to have delayed his offensive for seven days awaiting the prophet Samuel, only to have a dispute with Samuel concerning sacrificial offerings before the prophet left again. As described in 1 Samuel 13:16, "Saul, and Jonathan his son, and the people that were present with them, abode in Gibeah of Benjamin, but the Philistines encamped in Michmash." Josephus notes that only 600 men of Saul's original force were accounted for by the time he moved his camp to Gibeah.

The Philistines divided their force into three companies, seizing key points on the road network in the surrounding countryside, while Saul occupied a nearby hill, observing the Philistine activities but not engaging them. According to Josephus, the Philistines encamped on a prominent hill at Michmash with three peaks and a steep precipice, and on the basis of its defensibility relaxed its guard presence. Jonathan is recalled to have found a secret path around the Philistines, allowing him to flank them and defeat them, while Josephus claims he and his armour-bearer were goaded by the Philistines to do so while scouting the Philistine camp.

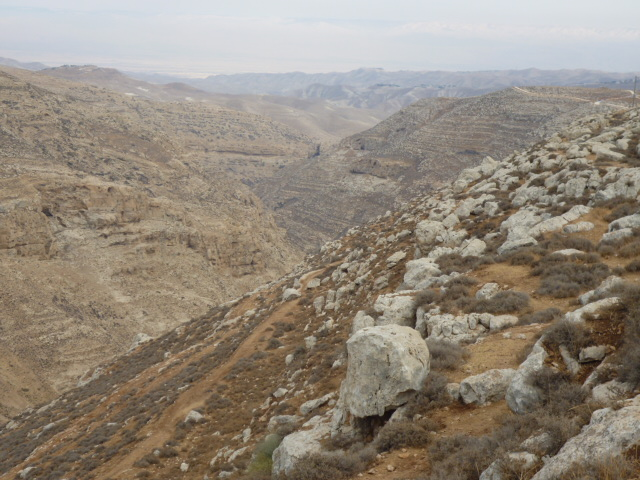
Nahal Michmas (Wadi es-Suweinit in Arabic), where Jonathan silently approached the Philistine garrison

Jonathan silently approached the Philistine garrison with his armour-bearer, not telling his father of the act, and passed two rocky crags: "there was a sharp rock on the one side, and a sharp rock on the other side: and the name of the one was Bozez and the name of the other Seneh." The two single-handedly climbed the ramparts and attacked the garrison "within as it were an half acre of land, which a yoke of oxen might plough." They are said to have killed twenty men together in that single ambush. The remainder of the camp awoke with confusion, and "melted away and they went on beating down one another", with fighting erupting among their multiethnic contingents believing there to be a greater number of Israelites. During the confusion and chaos, a detachment of Israelite warriors, which had previously been fighting alongside the Philistines, defected over to the army of King Saul, bringing the king's force from six hundred men to several thousand strong. Josephus also describes some of the deserters of Saul's army in the nearby cave networks rejoining his force during the tumult, purportedly swelling the total Israelite force to 10,000. Finally, 1 Samuel 14:15 claims a miraculous earthquake threw the entire Philistine host into disarray and a 'tumult'.

Drawn by the sounds of combat, Saul approached the garrison with his own force only to find that the army had already torn itself apart in fear, with the majority of survivors fleeing from Saul's army. Saul continued harassing the routed Philistines, and Josephus describes his forces promptly sacking the Philistine camp, supposedly committing several heretical acts with Saul's approval, including Saul inaugurating a large stone as an illicit altar in the midst of the camp for sacrifices. No account in the Bible tells us how many Philistines fell in the battle, though Josephus numbers the total Philistine casualties to as many as 60,000.

== Sources ==
- Richard A. Gabriel (2003), The Military History of Ancient Israel, Praeger, ISBN 0-275-97798-6
- Flavius Josephus (c.93-94). Antiquities of the Jews, Book VI, Chapter 6.
