= Michmas =

Ancient Israelite and Jewish town, identified with modern-day Mukhmas

Coordinates: 31.8719°N 35.2761°E

Michmas (/ˈmɪkmæʃ/; Hebrew: מִכְמָשׂ or מִכְמָס, romanized: Mīḵmās, lit. 'laid up (concealed) place') was an Israelite and Jewish town located in the highlands north of Jerusalem. According to the Hebrew Bible, it belonged to the Tribe of Benjamin. It was the setting of the biblical Battle of Michmash, recounted in 1 Samuel 14. Michmas was inhabited during the Second Temple period, when, according to the Mishnah, its fine wheat was brought to the Temple.

Michmas is identified with the Palestinian village of Mukhmas in the West Bank, which preserves its ancient name. The nearby Israeli settlement Ma'ale Mikhmas, founded in 1981, is also named after the biblical town.

== Location ==
Michmas was located near Geba, east of Bethel and south of Migron, and on the road to Jerusalem. Michmas lay on the line of march of an invading army from the north, on the north side of a steep and precipitous wadi known today in Arabic as Wadi es-Suweinit ("valley of the little thorn-tree" or "the acacia"), and in Modern Hebrew as Nahal Michmas.

== Biblical account ==
The town is known by its connection with the Philistine war of Saul and Jonathan, as it was the site of the Battle of Michmash recounted in the Bible. In 1 Samuel 13 ‘And Saul, and Jonathan his son, and the people that were present with them, abode in Gibeah of Benjamin, but the Philistines encamped in Michmas. According to this record, with the element of surprise and with confidence in God's help, King Saul's son Jonathan and his armour-bearer attacked and killed many in the Philistines garrison, causing panic throughout and a Philistine rout.

It tells how Jonathan and his armor-bearer showed themselves ‘to the Philistines’ garrison’ on the other side, and how they passed two sharp rocks: ‘there was a sharp rock on the one side, and a sharp rock on the other side: and the name of the one was Bozez and the name of the other Seneh.’ They clambered up the cliff and overpowered the garrison ‘within as it were an half acre of land, which a yoke of oxen might plough.’ The main body of the enemy awakened by the mêlée thought they were surrounded by Saul's troops and ‘melted away and they went on beating down one another.’

== From Sennacherib to Maccabaeans ==
Isaiah mentions the town in the context of Sennacherib's invasion during the reign of Hezekiah (Isa 10:28). After the captivity the men of the place returned (Ezr 2:27; Neh 7:31). At a later date it became the residence of Jonathan Maccabaeus and the seat of his government.

== Second Temple period ==
Modern scholars have suggested that Michmas was a priestly settlement during the Second Temple period. It was inhabited up until Bar-Kokhba revolt, during the early 2nd century CE. The Mishnah teaches that the finest of the wheat used in the offering of the Omer was taken from Michmas and from Zanoah (Menachot 8:1).

During the 1980s, 4 clusters of tombs, consisting of roughly 70 burial caves, were found in the vicinity of modern-day Mukhmas. In one of the burial caves, an ancient graffiti of a seven-branched menorah was found, together with a Paleo-Hebrew inscription. In the 1990s, German researchers purchased a ossuary found in Mukhmas bearing the name ‘Shimeon L[evi]’, written in the Hebrew alphabet.

== World War I ==
During World War I, British forces under the command of General Allenby were to face the Turks at the same location. Major Vivian Gilbert of the British army relates the story of an unnamed brigade major who was reading his Bible while contemplating the situation against the Ottoman forces. The brigade major remembered a town by the name of Michmash mentioned somewhere in the Bible. He found the verses, and discovered that there was a secret path around the town. He woke the brigadier general, and they found that the path still existed and was very lightly guarded. The British forces used this path to outmaneuver the Ottomans, and so took the town.
