= 1 Samuel 13 =

First Book of Samuel chapter

- ← chapter 12 chapter 14 →
- The pages containing the Books of Samuel (1 & 2 Samuel) in Leningrad Codex (1008 CE).
- Book: First book of Samuel
- Hebrew Bible part: Nevi'im
- Order in the Hebrew part: 3
- Category: Former Prophets
- Christian Bible part: Old Testament
- Order in the Christian part: 9

1 Samuel 13 is the thirteenth chapter of the First Book of Samuel in the Old Testament of the Christian Bible or the first part of the Books of Samuel in the Hebrew Bible. According to Jewish tradition the book was attributed to the prophet Samuel, with additions by the prophets Gad and Nathan, but modern scholars view it as a composition of a number of independent texts of various ages from c. 630–540 BCE. This chapter contains Saul's act of disobedience after his coronation. This is within a section comprising 1 Samuel 7–15 which records the rise of the monarchy in Israel and the account of the first years of King Saul.

== Text ==
This chapter was originally written in the Hebrew language. It is divided into 23 verses.

=== Textual witnesses ===
Some early manuscripts containing the text of this chapter in Hebrew are of the Masoretic Text tradition, which includes the Codex Cairensis (895), Aleppo Codex (10th century), and Codex Leningradensis (1008).

Extant ancient manuscripts of a translation into Koine Greek known as the Septuagint (originally was made in the last few centuries BCE) include Codex Vaticanus (B; $\mathfrak{G}$^{B}; 4th century). (Note: 1 Samuel 12:17–14:9 (1 leaf) and Psalms 49:20–79:11 (9 leaves) are missing from Codex Alexandrinus. Würthwein, Ernst (1988). Der Text des Alten Testaments (2nd ed.). Stuttgart: Deutsche Bibelgesellschaft. p. 85. ISBN 3-438-06006-X.) (Note: The whole book of 1 Samuel is missing from the extant Codex Sinaiticus.)

== Places ==
Places mentioned in this chapter
- Bethel
- Gibeah
- Gilead
- Gilgal
- Michmash
- Bethoron

== Analysis ==
Saul was appointed as a king to save his people 'from the hand of their enemies' (10:1), specifically the Philistines (9:16), that had a strong presence in the central hill country of Israel, were able to send out bands of raiders into different territories of Israel and controlled the manufacture of metal equipments for agricultural and weapons. He had to establish a standing army (verse 2), not just a militia, and achieved an initial success under the leadership of Jonathan, his son, against Philistine garrisons, despite with less force and inferior weapons. The Philistines mustered their large and powerful army causing the Israelites to flee eastwards to hide in the hills and some even went into Transjordan area (verses 6–7), even some in the Israelite army went away (verse 8). This became the setting for the battle of Michmash, where a Philistine garrison had been placed to guard a pass in the area (verse 23).

One major emphasis in this chapter is on the disobedience of Saul, which affects the future of his kingship (verse 13, cf. 12:14). Saul's failure to follow God's instruction through Samuel had doomed his dynasty and God chose another king who would obey. Thus, this chapter contains the first prediction of David to be the king of Israel.

== War with the Philistines (13:1–7) ==
Even as the Philistines had decisively been defeated by the Israelites led by Samuel (1 Samuel 7), they still pose a threat to Israel (cf. 1 Samuel 9:16), and would be a problem for Saul throughout his reign. Jonathan's successful attack on the Philistine outpost in Geba incited bigger conflicts. Saul assembled an army but now the Philistines had big military advantage, which caused many Israelites to flee to another place (verse 6) and leave the army (verse 7), leaving Saul in Gilgal with a dim prospect for the next battle.

=== Verse 1 ===
Saul reigned one year; and when he had reigned two years over Israel,

- "Reigned one year" translated from Hebrew: בן שנה שאול במלכו, ben-shā-nāh shā-’ūl bə-mā-lə-ḵōw.

This verse is absent in the Greek Septuagint version. Some Bible versions assume that some words are corrupted, so the numbers depicting Saul's age when he began to reign, and the length of his reign are missing. In the Hexapla version, Origin inserted the word "thirty" for Saul's age (now used in NIV, NLT, CSB, etc.). However, it may not be correct because, at that time, Jonathan was old enough to command an army (verse 2) and capable of performing heroic acts (1 Samuel 14:14). Josephus states that Saul reigned eighteen years in the lifetime of Samuel and twenty-two years after his death, for a total of forty years, which agrees with Acts 13:21. Saul's grandson, Mephibosheth, was five years old at Saul's death (2 Samuel 4:4).

=== Verse 2 ===
Saul chose him three thousand men of Israel; whereof two thousand were with Saul in Michmash and in mount Bethel, and a thousand were with Jonathan in Gibeah of Benjamin: and the rest of the people he sent every man to his tent.

- "3000 men": This is the beginning of a standing army in Israel, out of the 300,000 men that fought the Ammonites with Saul and returned with him to Gilgal.
- "Michmash": was four miles from Gilgal, nine miles from Jerusalem, near the village Rama (modern al-Ram). Once was called "Byra", which may be the same with Beer, where Jotham fled after he had delivered his parable (Judges 9:21). In the Misnah, the city was celebrated for bringing forth the best wheat. It is identified with the modern village, "Mukhmas", on the north of Wadi es-Suweinit, a 'deep ravine with precipitous sides running from the highlands of Benjamin to Jericho', on the south of which lays Geba (now Jaba').
- "Mount Bethel": east of the ancient city of Bethel, (Note: Jerome wrote that 'Bethel was over against Michmash' in De loc Heb., fol. 89. G.) and this could be the same as the place where Abraham built an altar near Bethel (Genesis 12:8), because Michmash lays to the east of Bethel.
- "Gibeah": hometown of Saul, a few miles to the southwest of Geba (cf. 1 Samuel 10:5). In the Cambridge Bible it is conjectured that when Saul occupied Michmash the Philistines moved their post at Gibeah (1 Samuel 10:5) to Geba, to more closely monitor Saul's movement, so Jonathan seized Gibeah, from where he attacked Geba (1 Samuel 13:3), a victory that was given credit to Saul as well.

== A late prophet and a premature sacrifice (13:8–14) ==
Saul waited seven days in Gilgal for Samuel to come performing the offerings before God (verse 13:8), in reference to the specific instruction in 1 Samuel 10:8, but when his army began to scatter, he decided to act on Samuel's advice in 1 Samuel 10:7 ("do whatever your hands find to do for God is with you") by offering the sacrifice without waiting for Samuel. Ironically, Samuel showed up just when Saul finished the burnt offering, before offered fellowship offerings. Saul's defense of his actions reveals his superstitious character, that his movitation of the offerings was to seek 'the Lord's favor' for the battle as a kind of "good luck" charm, a beginning move towards superstition and witchcraft as noticed by early church father, John Chrysostom. Saul's major sin is perhaps his attempt to 'usurp Samuel's role of religious leadership'. Because of this act, Samuel told Saul that his kingdom would not endure (verse 14), although Saul was still king and apparently God would still give him one more chance to show his obedience in the case of fighting the Amalekites, which Saul again failed and so was declared publicly that God had rejected Saul as king of Israel (15:26) and given his kingdom to 'one of his neighbors' (15:28).

=== Verse 14 ===
But now your kingdom shall not continue. The LORD has sought for Himself a man after His own heart, and the LORD has commanded him to be commander over His people, because you have not kept what the LORD commanded you."

- "A man after His own heart": this is often misinterpreted as having "a heart similar to God's", which could be questionable when applied to David who committed many sins, but the Hebrew term "heart" really refers to "will" or "choice", so the phrase actually means "after God's choice" as also found in various verses in the Bible and all points to "desire", "will" or "choice" (cf. 1 Samuel 14:7; Psalm 20:4; Jeremiah 3:15).

== Troop movement and Philistine's metal monopoly (13:15–23) ==
After giving his rebuke, Samuel left for Gibeah, then Saul, after counting his remaining army, decided to go to the same place. Saul's men decreased greatly from the 300,000 men against the Ammonites to 3000 men now down to 600 soldiers. Apparently his action to burn the offerings did not help to encourage more soldiers and furthermore, the full-scale battle did not start immediately. Verses 19–22 explain how the Philistines monopolized metalworking in the area, so only Saul and Jonathan had sword among the Israelites (13:22). That the Philistines had much better weapons caused the people of Israel to fear them even more.

== See also ==
- Gad
- Geba
- Goad
- Israelites
- Jordan River
- Mattock
- Pim weight
- Shofar
- Slaughter offering
- Smith (metalwork)
- Related Bible parts: 1 Samuel 3, 1 Samuel 9, 1 Samuel 10, 1 Samuel 11, 1 Samuel 12

== Sources ==
=== Commentaries on Samuel ===
- Auld, Graeme (2003). "1 & 2 Samuel". In James D. G. Dunn and John William Rogerson (ed.). Eerdmans Commentary on the Bible. Eerdmans. ISBN 978-0-8028-3711-0.
- Bergen, David T. (1996). 1, 2 Samuel. B&H Publishing Group. ISBN 978-0-8054-0107-3.
- Chapman, Stephen B. (2016). 1 Samuel as Christian Scripture: A Theological Commentary. Wm. B. Eerdmans Publishing Company. ISBN 978-1-4674-4516-0.
- Evans, Paul (2018). Longman, Tremper (ed.). 1-2 Samuel. The Story of God Bible Commentary. Zondervan Academic. ISBN 978-0-310-49094-4.
- Gordon, Robert (1986). I & II Samuel, A Commentary. Paternoster Press. ISBN 978-0-310-23022-9.
- Hertzberg, Hans Wilhelm (1964). I & II Samuel, A Commentary (trans. from German 2nd edition 1960 ed.). Westminster John Knox Press. p. 19. ISBN 978-0-664-22318-2.
- Tsumura, David Toshio (2007). The First Book of Samuel. Eerdmans. ISBN 978-0-8028-2359-5.

=== General ===
- Breytenbach, Andries (2000). "Who Is Behind The Samuel Narrative?". In Johannes Cornelis de Moor and H.F. Van Rooy (ed.). Past, Present, Future: the Deuteronomistic History and the Prophets. Brill. ISBN 9789004118713.
- Coogan, Michael David (2007). Coogan, Michael David; Brettler, Marc Zvi; Newsom, Carol Ann; Perkins, Pheme (eds.). The New Oxford Annotated Bible with the Apocryphal/Deuterocanonical Books: New Revised Standard Version, Issue 48 (Augmented 3rd ed.). Oxford University Press. ISBN 978-0-19-528881-0.
- Fitzmyer, Joseph A. (2008). A Guide to the Dead Sea Scrolls and Related Literature. Grand Rapids, MI: William B. Eerdmans Publishing Company. ISBN 978-0-8028-6241-9.
- Halley, Henry H. (1965). Halley's Bible Handbook: an abbreviated Bible commentary (24th (revised) ed.). Zondervan Publishing House. ISBN 0-310-25720-4.
- Hayes, Christine (2015). Introduction to the Bible. Yale University Press. ISBN 978-0-300-18827-1.
- Jones, Gwilym H. (2007). "12. 1 and 2 Samuel". In Barton, John; Muddiman, John (eds.). The Oxford Bible Commentary (first (paperback) ed.). Oxford University Press. pp. 196–232. ISBN 978-0-19-927718-6.
- Klein, R.W. (2003). "Samuel, books of". In Bromiley, Geoffrey W (ed.). The International Standard Bible Encyclopedia. Eerdmans. ISBN 978-0-8028-3784-4.
- Knight, Douglas A (1995). "Chapter 4 Deuteronomy and the Deuteronomists". In James Luther Mays, David L. Petersen and Kent Harold Richards (ed.). Old Testament Interpretation. T&T Clark. ISBN 978-0-567-29289-6.
- Ulrich, Eugene, ed. (2010). The Biblical Qumran Scrolls: Transcriptions and Textual Variants. Brill.
- Würthwein, Ernst (1995). The Text of the Old Testament. Translated by Rhodes, Erroll F. Grand Rapids, MI: Wm. B. Eerdmans. ISBN 0-8028-0788-7.
