= 2 Samuel 1 =

Second Book of Samuel chapter

- ← 1 Samuel 31 chapter 2 →
- The pages containing the Books of Samuel (1 & 2 Samuel) Leningrad Codex (1008 CE).
- Book: First book of Samuel
- Hebrew Bible part: Nevi'im
- Order in the Hebrew part: 3
- Category: Former Prophets
- Christian Bible part: Old Testament
- Order in the Christian part: 10

2 Samuel 1 is the first chapter of the Second Book of Samuel in the Old Testament of the Christian Bible or the second part of Books of Samuel in the Hebrew Bible. Jewish tradition attributes the book to the prophet Samuel, with later additions by the prophets Gad and Nathan; modern scholarship, however, regards it as a compilation of independent texts dated to c. 630–540 BCE. This chapter contains the account of David mourning the death of Saul and his sons, especially Jonathan. This is within a section comprising 1 Samuel 16 to 2 Samuel 5, which records the rise of David as the king of Israel.

== Text ==
This chapter was originally written in Biblical Hebrew. It is divided into 27 verses.

=== Textual witnesses ===
Some early manuscripts containing the text of this chapter in Biblical Hebrew are of the Masoretic Textual tradition, which includes the Codex Cairensis (895), Aleppo Codex (10th century), and Codex Leningradensis (1008). Fragments containing parts of this chapter in Hebrew were found among the Dead Sea Scrolls including 4Q51 (4QSam^{a}; 100–50 BCE) with extant verses 4–5, 10–13.

Extant ancient manuscripts of a translation into Koine Greek known as the Septuagint (originally compiled im the last few centuries BCE) include Codex Vaticanus (B; $\mathfrak{G}$^{B}; 4th century) and Codex Alexandrinus (A; $\mathfrak{G}$^{A}; 5th century). (Note: The whole book of 2 Samuel is missing from the extant Codex Sinaiticus.)

== Places ==
Places mentioned in this chapter
- Ashkelon
- Gath
- Mount Gilboa
- Ziklag

== Saul's death was reported to David (1:1–16) ==
This chapter concludes the narrative about Saul and David. It opened with an Amalekite reporting to David about Saul's death which is an entirely different account to the one in 1 Samuel 31:3–5, because this messenger claimed he killed Saul on the dying king's request and as proof he presented the king's crown and armlet to David. The most likely explanation of the discrepancy is that the Amalekite was lying in order to gain favor with David. He came with 'clothes torn and dirt on his head' to show signs of grief; this could have been contrived to give authenticity to his account, as it is more probable that he stumbled on Saul's body when he was searching for plunder on Mount Gilboa. Hence, he immediately stripped him of his crown and armlet, then saw in this an opportunity to get rewards from the next king. However, the messenger describes himself as 'a resident alien' (gēr), who was bound by the laws of his adopted community (Leviticus 24:22), so his disregard for the sanctity of 'the LORD'S anointed' should be punished by death. This narrative confirms once again David's respect for YHWH's anointed, and also exonerates David entirely of the events leading to his succession; David came innocently to be in possession of Saul's crown and armlet.

=== Verses 1–2 ===
^{1} Now it came to pass after the death of Saul, when David had returned from the slaughter of the Amalekites, and David had stayed two days in Ziklag, ^{2} on the third day, behold, it happened that a man came from Saul's camp with his clothes torn and dust on his head. So it was, when he came to David, that he fell to the ground and prostrated himself.

- "Ziklag": a city in the Negev (meaning "south", that is, in the southern area of Judah) which had been given to David by Achish son of Maoch, king of Gath, and for more than a year was used by David as a base from which he conducted military expeditions (1 Samuel 27:5–12). 1 Samuel 30:1–19 recorded that the Amalekites destroyed Ziklag while Saul fought the Philistines, so David and his men pursued and slaughtered the attackers as noted in this verse.
- "Clothes torn and dust on his head": outward expressions of grief, a common response to tragic news in the ancient Near East.

== David mourned Saul and Jonathan (1:17–27) ==
The lament in this section can be attributed to David himself with a very personal expression of grief over the loss of Jonathan. The poem was preserved in an anthology known as the Book of Jashar (cf. Joshua 10:12–13; 1 Kings 8:12–13). It has a kind of refrain 'how the mighty have fallen', occurring in three places (verses 19, 25, 27), dividing the poem into sections (19–24, 25–27) and forming an inclusio bracketing the beginning and the ending. After stating that Israel's 'glory' has fallen, the poet wishes that the news be kept from the cities of the Philistines to prevent their exultation over Judah (verse 20), followed by curses on Mount Gilboa (verse 21), the scene of defeat, condemning it to barrenness. Then, David extols Saul and Jonathan (verses 22–24) as heroes who persevered in battle (verse 22), were strong and swift (verse 23) and joined in death as father and son (verse 23). He called the women of Israel to mourn Saul, who had brought them prosperity and luxury (verse 24). David specially vents his personal grief for Jonathan (verses 25b–26), and the word 'love' echoes once again the covenant of friendship between the two, before the final refrain in verse 27.

=== Verse 26 ===
I am distressed for you, my brother Jonathan;
You have been very pleasant to me;
Your love to me was wonderful,
Surpassing the love of women.

- "Surpassing the love of women": Targum renders as more than the love of two women, which is David's two wives, Ahinoam and Abigail.

== See also ==
- Amalekites
- Book of Jasher (Biblical references)
- Israel
- Non-canonical books referenced in the Bible
- Jezreel
- Tribe of Judah
- Related Bible parts: 1 Samuel 27, 1 Samuel 31, 1 Samuel 16, 2 Samuel 2, 1 Chronicles 10

== Sources ==
=== Commentaries on Samuel ===
- Auld, Graeme (2003). "1 & 2 Samuel". In James D. G. Dunn and John William Rogerson (ed.). Eerdmans Commentary on the Bible. Eerdmans. ISBN 9780802837110.
- Bergen, David T. (1996). 1, 2 Samuel. B&H Publishing Group. ISBN 9780805401073.
- Chapman, Stephen B. (2016). 1 Samuel as Christian Scripture: A Theological Commentary. Wm. B. Eerdmans Publishing Company. ISBN 978-1467445160.
- Collins, John J. (2014). "Chapter 14: 1 Samuel 12 – 2 Samuel 25". Introduction to the Hebrew Scriptures. Fortress Press. pp. 277–296. ISBN 978-1451469233.
- Evans, Paul (2018). Longman, Tremper (ed.). 1-2 Samuel. The Story of God Bible Commentary. Zondervan Academic. ISBN 978-0310490944.
- Gordon, Robert (1986). I & II Samuel, A Commentary. Paternoster Press. ISBN 9780310230229.
- Hertzberg, Hans Wilhelm (1964). I & II Samuel, A Commentary (trans. from German 2nd edition 1960 ed.). Westminster John Knox Press. p. 19. ISBN 978-0664223182.
- Tsumura, David Toshio (2007). The First Book of Samuel. Eerdmans. ISBN 9780802823595.

=== General ===
- Breytenbach, Andries (2000). "Who Is Behind The Samuel Narrative?". In Johannes Cornelis de Moor and H.F. Van Rooy (ed.). Past, Present, Future: the Deuteronomistic History and the Prophets. Brill. ISBN 9789004118713.
- Coogan, Michael David (2007). Coogan, Michael David; Brettler, Marc Zvi; Newsom, Carol Ann; Perkins, Pheme (eds.). The New Oxford Annotated Bible with the Apocryphal/Deuterocanonical Books: New Revised Standard Version, Issue 48 (Augmented 3rd ed.). Oxford University Press. ISBN 978-0195288810.
- Fitzmyer, Joseph A. (2008). A Guide to the Dead Sea Scrolls and Related Literature. Grand Rapids, MI: William B. Eerdmans Publishing Company. ISBN 9780802862419.
- Halley, Henry H. (1965). Halley's Bible Handbook: an abbreviated Bible commentary (24th (revised) ed.). Zondervan Publishing House. ISBN 0-310-25720-4.
- Hayes, Christine (2015). Introduction to the Bible. Yale University Press. ISBN 978-0300188271.
- Jones, Gwilym H. (2007). "12. 1 and 2 Samuel". In Barton, John; Muddiman, John (eds.). The Oxford Bible Commentary (first (paperback) ed.). Oxford University Press. pp. 196–232. ISBN 978-0199277186.
- Klein, R.W. (2003). "Samuel, books of". In Bromiley, Geoffrey W (ed.). The International Standard Bible Encyclopedia. Eerdmans. ISBN 9780802837844.
- Knight, Douglas A (1995). "Chapter 4 Deuteronomy and the Deuteronomists". In James Luther Mays, David L. Petersen and Kent Harold Richards (ed.). Old Testament Interpretation. T&T Clark. ISBN 9780567292896.
- McKane, William (1993). "Samuel, Book of". In Metzger, Bruce M; Coogan, Michael D (eds.). The Oxford Companion to the Bible. Oxford University Press. pp. 409–413. ISBN 978-0195046458.
- Ulrich, Eugene, ed. (2010). The Biblical Qumran Scrolls: Transcriptions and Textual Variants. Brill.
- Würthwein, Ernst (1995). The Text of the Old Testament. Translated by Rhodes, Erroll F. Grand Rapids, MI: Wm. B. Eerdmans. ISBN 0-8028-0788-7.
