= Bezek =

Bezek or Bezeq may refer to:

- Bezeq, an Israeli telecommunications provider
- Bezek, a village in Chelm County in eastern Poland
- Bezek, in southern Canaan, where the Israelites defeated King Adoni-Bezek
- Bezek, what Felix Fabri called Beit Jala
