= 1 Samuel 12 =

First Book of Samuel chapter

- ← chapter 11 chapter 13 →
- The pages containing the Books of Samuel (1 & 2 Samuel) in Leningrad Codex (1008 CE).
- Book: First book of Samuel
- Hebrew Bible part: Nevi'im
- Order in the Hebrew part: 3
- Category: Former Prophets
- Christian Bible part: Old Testament
- Order in the Christian part: 9

1 Samuel 12 is the twelfth chapter of the First Book of Samuel in the Old Testament of the Christian Bible or the first part of the Books of Samuel in the Hebrew Bible. According to Jewish tradition the book was attributed to the prophet Samuel, with additions by the prophets Gad and Nathan, but modern scholars view it as a composition of a number of independent texts of various ages from c. 630–540 BCE. This chapter contains Samuel's address to the people of Israel after Saul's coronation. This is within a section comprising 1 Samuel 7–15 which records the rise of the monarchy in Israel and the account of the first years of King Saul.

== Text ==
This chapter was originally written in the Hebrew language. It is divided into 25 verses.

=== Textual witnesses ===
Some early manuscripts containing the text of this chapter in Hebrew are of the Masoretic Text tradition, which includes the Codex Cairensis (895), Aleppo Codex (10th century), and Codex Leningradensis (1008). Fragments containing parts of this chapter in Hebrew were found among the Dead Sea Scrolls including 4Q51 (4QSam^{a}; 100–50 BCE) with extant verses 7–8, 10–19 and 4Q52 (4QSam^{b}; 250 BCE) with extant verses 3, 5–6.

Extant ancient manuscripts of a translation into Koine Greek known as the Septuagint (originally was made in the last few centuries BCE) include Codex Vaticanus (B; $\mathfrak{G}$^{B}; 4th century). (Note: The whole book of 1 Samuel is missing from the extant Codex Sinaiticus.)

== Analysis ==
This chapter closes the period of the Israel Judges, concluding the cycle of alternative pro- and antimonarchical strands. It began with an antimonarchial stance of Samuel which is a repetition of statements in 8:1–22, but with a new element— a contrast between the old prophetic regime and the new royal one. Although the request for a king was regarded as a wicked act (verse 17), there is a way for people and king to be good before YHWH, that is, by showing faithfulness. Covenantal language and a historical summary were common in covenant ceremonies, as also notable in Joshua 24, consisting of 'introduction, antecedent history, transition to the present, requirements, blessings, and curses'. Samuel was confirmed to be true to the prophetic office and had acted according to God's will, so he would continue to serve the people as intercessor and instructor (verse 23), exhorting them to obey God, so they would not perish for their sins

== Samuel's clean record of service (12:1–5) ==
After stating that the kingship was a 'concession in response to popular demand' (verse 1), Samuel admitted that this was a departure from the kind of leadership exercised by himself, and posed a number of questions with the aim of justifying his ruling thus far. The verb 'take' became a key to compare his just leadership, as the prophet had 'taken' nothing from the people, to the future 'ways of the king' (cf. 1 Samuel 8:11-18), where a number of things will be 'taken' from the people by the king, therefore the people had taken a step backwards in requesting for a king.

=== Verse 1 ===
Now Samuel said to all Israel: "Indeed I have heeded your voice in all that you said to me, and have made a king over you."

- "Heeded" (KJV: "hearkened"): or "listened to".

=== Verse 2 ===
And now, behold, the king walks before you, and I am old and gray; and behold, my sons are with you. I have walked before you from my youth until this day.

- "My sons are with you": Samuel did not put them forward as leaders, but to illustrate his old age.

== Recitation of salvation history (12:6–15) ==
After confirming his spotless record of service with the people, Samuel recited how YHWH had saved Israel in the past, again to show that asking for a king was an unnecessary step, because God 'in all his saving deeds' had always provided saviors or judges who successfully delivered the people from their enemies, from the time of Moses and Aaron to liberate the people out of Egypt (verses 6, 8), until the period of judges, with the examples of the victories over three different oppressors: Sisera (Judges 4–5), the Philistines (Judges 13–16), and the Moabites (Judges 3), within a skeletal pattern of 'apostasy-oppression-repentance-deliverance', using some saviors: Jerubaal (Gideon), Barak, Jephthah, and Samson (cf. Hebrews 11:32). Verses 14–15 state the blessing and curse of the covenant: all will be well if the people remain faithful, but if not, they will be wiped away (cf. verse 25).

=== Verse 13 ===
And now behold the king whom you have chosen, for whom you have asked; behold, the Lord has set a king over you.

- "Whom you have asked": this is a pun to Saul's name (in Hebrew means "asked").

== Sign of thunderstorm and closing words (12:16–25) ==
Even in his old age, Samuel still possessed supernatural powers that he could call upon God to bring thunder and rain that day (verses 17–18), a rare occurrence during the period of wheat harvest and if severely happened, it would destroy the ripe crops. This evoked awe and repentance from the people, setting up for closing words from Samuel that he would continue to pray for the people and instruct them "the way that is good and right", definitely not a sign of retirement.

== See also ==
- Aaron
- Ammon
- Ashtaroth
- Baalim
- Bedan
- Hazor
- Israelites
- Jacob
- Moses
- Nahash
- The Exodus
- Related Bible parts: Judges 21, 1 Samuel 1, 1 Samuel 9, 1 Samuel 10, 1 Samuel 11

== Sources ==
=== Commentaries on Samuel ===
- Auld, Graeme (2003). "1 & 2 Samuel". In James D. G. Dunn and John William Rogerson (ed.). Eerdmans Commentary on the Bible. Eerdmans. ISBN 9780802837110.
- Bergen, David T. (1996). 1, 2 Samuel. B&H Publishing Group. ISBN 9780805401073.
- Chapman, Stephen B. (2016). 1 Samuel as Christian Scripture: A Theological Commentary. Wm. B. Eerdmans Publishing Company. ISBN 978-1467445160.
- Evans, Paul (2018). Longman, Tremper (ed.). 1-2 Samuel. The Story of God Bible Commentary. Zondervan Academic. ISBN 978-0310490944.
- Gordon, Robert (1986). I & II Samuel, A Commentary. Paternoster Press. ISBN 9780310230229.
- Hertzberg, Hans Wilhelm (1964). I & II Samuel, A Commentary (trans. from German 2nd edition 1960 ed.). Westminster John Knox Press. p. 19. ISBN 978-0664223182.
- Tsumura, David Toshio (2007). The First Book of Samuel. Eerdmans. ISBN 9780802823595.

=== General ===
- Breytenbach, Andries (2000). "Who Is Behind The Samuel Narrative?". In Johannes Cornelis de Moor and H.F. Van Rooy (ed.). Past, Present, Future: the Deuteronomistic History and the Prophets. Brill. ISBN 9789004118713.
- Coogan, Michael David (2007). Coogan, Michael David; Brettler, Marc Zvi; Newsom, Carol Ann; Perkins, Pheme (eds.). The New Oxford Annotated Bible with the Apocryphal/Deuterocanonical Books: New Revised Standard Version, Issue 48 (Augmented 3rd ed.). Oxford University Press. ISBN 978-0195288810.
- Fitzmyer, Joseph A. (2008). A Guide to the Dead Sea Scrolls and Related Literature. Grand Rapids, MI: William B. Eerdmans Publishing Company. ISBN 9780802862419.
- Halley, Henry H. (1965). Halley's Bible Handbook: an abbreviated Bible commentary (24th (revised) ed.). Zondervan Publishing House. ISBN 0-310-25720-4.
- Hayes, Christine (2015). Introduction to the Bible. Yale University Press. ISBN 978-0300188271.
- Jones, Gwilym H. (2007). "12. 1 and 2 Samuel". In Barton, John; Muddiman, John (eds.). The Oxford Bible Commentary (first (paperback) ed.). Oxford University Press. pp. 196–232. ISBN 978-0199277186.
- Klein, R.W. (2003). "Samuel, books of". In Bromiley, Geoffrey W (ed.). The International Standard Bible Encyclopedia. Eerdmans. ISBN 9780802837844.
- Knight, Douglas A (1995). "Chapter 4 Deuteronomy and the Deuteronomists". In James Luther Mays, David L. Petersen and Kent Harold Richards (ed.). Old Testament Interpretation. T&T Clark. ISBN 9780567292896.
- Ulrich, Eugene, ed. (2010). The Biblical Qumran Scrolls: Transcriptions and Textual Variants. Brill.
- Würthwein, Ernst (1995). The Text of the Old Testament. Translated by Rhodes, Erroll F. Grand Rapids, MI: Wm. B. Eerdmans. ISBN 0-8028-0788-7.
