= 1 Samuel 11 =

First Book of Samuel chapter

- ← chapter 10 chapter 12 →
- The pages containing the Books of Samuel (1 & 2 Samuel) in Leningrad Codex (1008 CE).
- Book: First book of Samuel
- Hebrew Bible part: Nevi'im
- Order in the Hebrew part: 3
- Category: Former Prophets
- Christian Bible part: Old Testament
- Order in the Christian part: 9

1 Samuel 11 is the eleventh chapter of the First Book of Samuel in the Old Testament of the Christian Bible or the first part of the Books of Samuel in the Hebrew Bible. According to Jewish tradition the book was attributed to the prophet Samuel, with additions by the prophets Gad and Nathan, but modern scholars view it as a composition of a number of independent texts of various ages from c. 630–540 BCE. This chapter describes Saul obliterating the army of Nahash king of Ammon and liberating Jabesh-Gilead, thereby convincing the people about his ability to lead, and causing them to appoint him king. This is within a section comprising 1 Samuel 7–15 which records the rise of the monarchy in Israel and the account of the first years of King Saul.

== Text ==
This chapter was originally written in the Hebrew language. It is divided into 15 verses.

=== Textual witnesses ===
Some early manuscripts containing the text of this chapter in Hebrew are of the Masoretic Text tradition, which includes the Codex Cairensis (895), Aleppo Codex (10th century), and Codex Leningradensis (1008). Fragments containing parts of this chapter in Hebrew were found among the Dead Sea Scrolls including 4Q51 (4QSam^{a}; 100–50 BCE) with extant verses 1–2, 7–12.

Extant ancient manuscripts of a translation into Koine Greek known as the Septuagint (originally was made in the last few centuries BCE) include Codex Vaticanus (B; $\mathfrak{G}$^{B}; 4th century) and Codex Alexandrinus (A; $\mathfrak{G}$^{A}; 5th century). (Note: The whole book of 1 Samuel is missing from the extant Codex Sinaiticus.)

== Places ==
Places mentioned in this chapter
- Gibeah
- Gilgal
- Jabesh-Gilead

== The threat of the Ammonites (11:1–3) ==
For this narrative, 4QSam^{a} (among the Dead Sea Scrolls; from first century BCE) and the writings of Josephus from the first century CE, provide background information that Nahash, king of the Ammonites, had subdued Israel's Transjordanian tribes (Gadites and Reubenites) and gouged out the right eyes of his captives (cf. 11:2 for explanation), but 7000 Israelites escaped and hid in Jabesh-Gilead, so now Nahash came to threaten the city. Significantly, Jabesh-Gilead was the only town that had previously refused the call to arms (Judges 21), so now their chance of receiving help from the other Israelite tribes was slim, and that's probably why Nahash allowed them seven days to send messengers to try asking. Due to their prior refusal to join the call to arms, the people of Jabesh-Gilead were slaughtered by the other tribes, except for 400 virgin girls who were left alive and given to be the wives of the survivors of the tribe of Benjamin (among 600 men) who had escaped a separate slaughter by the Israelite tribes. Thus, if it were not for the inhabitants of Jabesh Gilead, the tribe of Benjamin would have been annihilated.

=== Verse 1 ===
Then Nahash the Ammonite came up and encamped against Jabesh Gilead; and all the men of Jabesh said to Nahash, "Make a covenant with us, and we will serve you.""

- "Encamped": or "besieged".
- "Nahash king of Ammon": this name means "serpent" in Hebrew.

Prior to the first word "Then..." 4QSam^{a} and Greek Septuagint texts have a phrase: "about a month later". Prior to the whole verse, 4QSam^{a} and Josephus (Antiquities 6.5.1. [68-71]) attest to an addition which explains Nahash's practice of enemy mutilation, and by so doing provides a smoother transition to the following paragraph than is found in the Masoretic Text, or Greek Septuagint manuscripts. NRSV renders it as verse 10:27b as follows: "Now Nahash, king of the Ammonites, had been grievously oppressing the Gadites and the Reubenites. He would gouge out the right eye of each of them and would not grant Israel a deliverer. No one was left of the Israelites across the Jordan whose right eye Nahash, king of the Ammonites, had not gouged out. But there were 7,000 men who had escaped from the Ammonites and had entered Jabesh Gilead. About a month later, Nahash the Ammonite went up and besieged Jabesh Gilead." The variations may be explained as scribal errors due to homeoteleuton, in which case the scribe jumps from one word to another word with a similar ending later in the text. Comparing to the reading in 4QSam^{a}, NET Bible suggests that the scribe of the MT may have skipped from the phrase Hebrew: ויהי כמחרישׁ, vayehi kemakharish, at the end of 1 Samuel 10:27, which should possibly be Hebrew: ויהי כמו חרשׁ, vayehi kemo kheresh, and picked up after the phrase Hebrew: ויהי כמו חדשׁ, vayehi kemo khodesh, "it happened about a month later...". 4QSam^{a} also contains a case of homeoteleuton in this passage, that the scribe first skipped from one case of Hebrew: גלעד, Gilʿad, "Gilead", to another, then inserted the missing 10 words between the lines of the 4QSam^{a} text. The fact that the scribe made this type of mistake and was able to make corrections indicates that the person was copying from a source that had these verses in it. Moreover, the 4QSam^{a} text first introduces Nahash with his full title, as the king of the Ammonites, which is considered the usual style.

=== Verse 2 ===
And Nahash the Ammonite answered them, "On this condition I will make a covenant with you, that I may put out all your right eyes, and bring reproach on all Israel."

- "Put out...right eyes": Josephus explains that without one's right eye and when the left eye was covered by a war shield, a soldier might be wholly useless in war.

== Saul defeated the Ammonites and rescued Jabesh Gilead (11:4–15) ==
When the messengers from Jabesh Gilead reached Saul's hometown, Gibeah, Saul was working as a farmer and only heard about the situation second hand, after witnessing the townpeople publicly weeping over the news. Unlike others, Saul became angry after hearing the message, and it is said that it was God's spirit who brought on his anger (11:6; cf. Judges 3:10; 6:34; 11:29; 13:25; especially Samson in 14:6, 19; 15:14). The way Saul called the people to arms was by dismembering a pair of his oxen ("a yoke of oxen") and sending the pieces to all places in the territory of Israel (cf. Judges 19:29–30), with a message that the people who refused to respond would have a fate like that of the oxen. Saul's strategy and eventual victory was similar to that of former judges: by dividing the forces (cf. Judges 7) to surround the enemy camp and attacking in an early morning, but the attribution of the victory was to YHWH (verse 12). The victory proves Saul's worthiness of the kingship contrary to the words of his opponents (10:26), but those critics were spared according to Saul's own wish and Saul was acclaimed king once more at Gilgal.

=== Verse 15 ===
And all the people went to Gilgal; and there they made Saul king before the LORD in Gilgal; and there they sacrificed sacrifices of peace offerings before the LORD; and there Saul and all the men of Israel rejoiced greatly.

- "And there they made Saul king": The Septuagint reads, "and Samuel anointed Saul king there," which is not improbable, as later David also had his original anointing by Samuel in front of his family (1 Samuel 16:12-13), then was twice publicly anointed, first as king of Judah (2 Samuel 2:4), and again as king over all Israel (2 Samuel 5:3), but this may be included in the word "made king" in Masoretic Text (see 1 Samuel 12:3, 1 Samuel 12:5). Josephus records that it was Samuel who suggested the second ordination in Gilgal and anointed Saul there with the 'holy oil'. (Note: Josephus wrote: "Samuel had told them that he ought to confirm the kingdom to Saul by a second ordination of him, they all came together to the city of Gilgal, for thither did he command them to come. So the prophet anointed Saul with the holy oil in the sight of the multitude, and declared him to be king the second time." (Antiquities of the Jews, book 6, chapter 5, section 4))

== See also ==
- Ammonites
- Bezek
- Children of Israel
- Spirit of the Lord
- Tribes of Israel
- Tribe of Judah
- Related Bible parts: Judges 21, 1 Samuel 8, 1 Samuel 9, 1 Samuel 10

== Sources ==
=== Commentaries on Samuel ===
- Auld, Graeme (2003). "1 & 2 Samuel". In James D. G. Dunn and John William Rogerson (ed.). Eerdmans Commentary on the Bible. Eerdmans. ISBN 978-0-8028-3711-0.
- Bergen, David T. (1996). 1, 2 Samuel. B&H Publishing Group. ISBN 978-0-8054-0107-3.
- Chapman, Stephen B. (2016). 1 Samuel as Christian Scripture: A Theological Commentary. Wm. B. Eerdmans Publishing Company. ISBN 978-1-4674-4516-0.
- Evans, Paul (2018). Longman, Tremper (ed.). 1-2 Samuel. The Story of God Bible Commentary. Zondervan Academic. ISBN 978-0-310-49094-4.
- Gordon, Robert (1986). I & II Samuel, A Commentary. Paternoster Press. ISBN 978-0-310-23022-9.
- Hertzberg, Hans Wilhelm (1964). I & II Samuel, A Commentary (trans. from German 2nd edition 1960 ed.). Westminster John Knox Press. p. 19. ISBN 978-0-664-22318-2.
- Tsumura, David Toshio (2007). The First Book of Samuel. Eerdmans. ISBN 978-0-8028-2359-5.

=== General ===
- Breytenbach, Andries (2000). "Who Is Behind The Samuel Narrative?". In Johannes Cornelis de Moor and H.F. Van Rooy (ed.). Past, Present, Future: the Deuteronomistic History and the Prophets. Brill. ISBN 9789004118713.
- Coogan, Michael David (2007). Coogan, Michael David; Brettler, Marc Zvi; Newsom, Carol Ann; Perkins, Pheme (eds.). The New Oxford Annotated Bible with the Apocryphal/Deuterocanonical Books: New Revised Standard Version, Issue 48 (Augmented 3rd ed.). Oxford University Press. ISBN 978-0-19-528881-0.
- Fitzmyer, Joseph A. (2008). A Guide to the Dead Sea Scrolls and Related Literature. Grand Rapids, MI: William B. Eerdmans Publishing Company. ISBN 978-0-8028-6241-9.
- Halley, Henry H. (1965). Halley's Bible Handbook: an abbreviated Bible commentary (24th (revised) ed.). Zondervan Publishing House. ISBN 0-310-25720-4.
- Hayes, Christine (2015). Introduction to the Bible. Yale University Press. ISBN 978-0-300-18827-1.
- Jones, Gwilym H. (2007). "12. 1 and 2 Samuel". In Barton, John; Muddiman, John (eds.). The Oxford Bible Commentary (first (paperback) ed.). Oxford University Press. pp. 196–232. ISBN 978-0-19-927718-6.
- Klein, R.W. (2003). "Samuel, books of". In Bromiley, Geoffrey W (ed.). The International Standard Bible Encyclopedia. Eerdmans. ISBN 978-0-8028-3784-4.
- Knight, Douglas A (1995). "Chapter 4 Deuteronomy and the Deuteronomists". In James Luther Mays, David L. Petersen and Kent Harold Richards (ed.). Old Testament Interpretation. T&T Clark. ISBN 978-0-567-29289-6.
- Ulrich, Eugene, ed. (2010). The Biblical Qumran Scrolls: Transcriptions and Textual Variants. Brill.
- Würthwein, Ernst (1995). The Text of the Old Testament. Translated by Rhodes, Erroll F. Grand Rapids, MI: Wm. B. Eerdmans. ISBN 0-8028-0788-7.
