= 1 Samuel 10 =

First Book of Samuel chapter

- ← chapter 9 chapter 11 →
- The pages containing the Books of Samuel (1 & 2 Samuel) in Leningrad Codex (1008 CE).
- Book: First book of Samuel
- Hebrew Bible part: Nevi'im
- Order in the Hebrew part: 3
- Category: Former Prophets
- Christian Bible part: Old Testament
- Order in the Christian part: 9

1 Samuel 10 is the tenth chapter of the First Book of Samuel in the Old Testament of the Christian Bible or the first part of the Books of Samuel in the Hebrew Bible. According to Jewish tradition the book was attributed to the prophet Samuel, with additions by the prophets Gad and Nathan, but modern scholars view it as a composition of a number of independent texts of various ages from c. 630–540 BCE. This chapter describes the anointing of Saul as the first king of Israel, within a section comprising 1 Samuel 7–15 which records the rise of the monarchy in Israel and the account of the first years of King Saul.

== Text ==
This chapter was originally written in the Hebrew language. It is divided into 27 verses.

=== Textual witnesses ===
Some early manuscripts containing the text of this chapter in Hebrew are of the Masoretic Text tradition, which includes the Codex Cairensis (895), Aleppo Codex (10th century), and Codex Leningradensis (1008). Fragments containing parts of this chapter in Hebrew were found among the Dead Sea Scrolls including 4Q51 (4QSam^{a}; 100–50 BCE) with extant verses 3–12, 14, 16, 18, 24–27.

Extant ancient manuscripts of a translation into Koine Greek known as the Septuagint (originally was made in the last few centuries BCE) include Codex Vaticanus (B; $\mathfrak{G}$^{B}; 4th century) and Codex Alexandrinus (A; $\mathfrak{G}$^{A}; 5th century). (Note: The whole book of 1 Samuel is missing from the extant Codex Sinaiticus.)

== Places ==
Places mentioned in this chapter
- Bethel
- Gibeah
- Gilgal
- Mizpah
- Ramah
- Tabor

== Samuel anoints Saul (10:1–16) ==
The anointing of Saul, as performed by Samuel under God's direction, set the king apart from the rest of the people as "anointed of the Lord" (cf. 1 Samuel 12:3, 1 Samuel 12:5, etc.), and sanctified as נגיד, nagid, which is "prince" or "ruler" (also "captain", "leader" or "commander".

=== Verse 1 ===
Then Samuel took a flask of oil and poured it on his head, and kissed him and said: “Is it not because the Lord has anointed you commander over His inheritance?"

- "Flask of oil" (KJV: "vial of oil"): not using a "horn of oil" as in the cases of David and Solomon (cf. 1 Samuel 2:10), only one other king, Jehu, was anointed like Saul, and similarly, although also initiated by YHWH, their reigns were far from ideal.
- "Inheritance": according to Masoretic Text, Targum and Vulgate, whereas Septuagint has "people Israel; and you shall rule the people of the Lord", followed in Septuagint and Vulgate with "And you shall deliver His people from the hands of their enemies all around them. And this shall be a sign to you, that God has anointed you to be a prince."

== Saul proclaimed king of Israel (10:17–27) ==
This section can be considered the continuation of the narrative in 1 Samuel 8:1–22 that the previously dismissed assembly was at this time reconvened to appoint a king. Samuel started by saying a judgement oracle (verses17–19) that the people chose to reject God and elect a king, despite God's continuous protection and ability to deliver them. The election by lot was used elsewhere to find a hidden offender (Joshua 7; 1 Samuel 14:38-44), but this time, it is to confirm that Saul was God's choice, which was also acclaimed because of Saul's stature (verses 21b–27; cf. 1 Samuel 9:2). YHWH's displeasure with the people's request to have a king did not make Saul's election invalid. The public acclamation of Saul (verse 24), an important element in a king's installation (cf. 1 Kings 1:25, 34, 39; 2 Kings 11:12), was followed by the reading of the rights and duties of the kingship (cf. 1 Samuel 8:11–18; Deuteronomy 17:18–20), establishing the 'subjugation of the monarchy to prophetic authority'.

=== Verse 24 ===
And Samuel said to all the people, "Do you see him whom the Lord has chosen, that there is no one like him among all the people?"
So all the people shouted and said, "Long live the king!"

- "Long live the king": from Hebrew which means "May the king live".

=== Verse 25 ===
Then Samuel told the people the manner of the kingdom, and wrote it in a book, and laid it up before the Lord. And Samuel sent all the people away, every man to his house.

- "The manner of the kingdom": probably refers to the regulations related to kingship given to Moses in Deuteronomy 17:14–20.

=== Verse 27 ===
But some worthless fellows said, “How can this man save us?” And they despised him and brought him no present. But he held his peace.

- "Worthless fellows" (KJV: "children of Belial"): literally "sons of worthlessness" (cf. 1 Samuel 2:12).
- "He held his peace": or "Saul kept silent". Septuagint has an addition "after about a month" after this statement, which is supported by a hand correction of a manuscript among Dead Sea Scrolls.

== Extended version of 10:27 ==
There is a textual variation between verse 27 and chapter 11 found in The Samuel Scroll, one of the Dead Sea Scrolls. The Masoretic text has something of an abrupt transition between 10:27 and 11:1, which changes topics to discuss the actions of Nahash of Ammon. The Dead Sea Scrolls version includes four sentences introducing Nahash as oppressing the nearby Jewish tribes. Additionally, the historian Josephus's work Jewish Antiquities features a very similar sentence that seems to be a paraphrase of the same material. It is unclear whether older forms of the text lacked the section, and a scribe added it to the Dead Sea Scrolls version as a bridge, or if the reverse occurred and a scribal error dropped copying the section for the copies that would later become the basis for the Masoretic text. If such an error did occur, it apparently happened early enough to affect the Greek translation of Samuel in the Septuagint as well.

== See also ==
- Kish
- Matri
- Mount Tabor
- Pipe
- Psaltery
- Tabret
- Zelzah
- Related Bible parts: 1 Samuel 2, 1 Samuel 8, 1 Samuel 9, 1 Samuel 11

== Sources ==
=== Commentaries on Samuel ===
- Auld, Graeme (2003). "1 & 2 Samuel". In James D. G. Dunn and John William Rogerson (ed.). Eerdmans Commentary on the Bible. Eerdmans. ISBN 978-0-8028-3711-0.
- Bergen, David T. (1996). 1, 2 Samuel. B&H Publishing Group. ISBN 978-0-8054-0107-3.
- Chapman, Stephen B. (2016). 1 Samuel as Christian Scripture: A Theological Commentary. Wm. B. Eerdmans Publishing Company. ISBN 978-1-4674-4516-0.
- Evans, Paul (2018). Longman, Tremper (ed.). 1-2 Samuel. The Story of God Bible Commentary. Zondervan Academic. ISBN 978-0-310-49094-4.
- Gordon, Robert (1986). I & II Samuel, A Commentary. Paternoster Press. ISBN 978-0-310-23022-9.
- Hertzberg, Hans Wilhelm (1964). I & II Samuel, A Commentary (trans. from German 2nd edition 1960 ed.). Westminster John Knox Press. p. 19. ISBN 978-0-664-22318-2.
- Tsumura, David Toshio (2007). The First Book of Samuel. Eerdmans. ISBN 978-0-8028-2359-5.

=== General ===
- Breytenbach, Andries (2000). "Who Is Behind The Samuel Narrative?". In Johannes Cornelis de Moor and H.F. Van Rooy (ed.). Past, Present, Future: the Deuteronomistic History and the Prophets. Brill. ISBN 9789004118713.
- Coogan, Michael David (2007). Coogan, Michael David; Brettler, Marc Zvi; Newsom, Carol Ann; Perkins, Pheme (eds.). The New Oxford Annotated Bible with the Apocryphal/Deuterocanonical Books: New Revised Standard Version, Issue 48 (Augmented 3rd ed.). Oxford University Press. ISBN 978-0-19-528881-0.
- Fitzmyer, Joseph A. (2008). A Guide to the Dead Sea Scrolls and Related Literature. Grand Rapids, MI: William B. Eerdmans Publishing Company. ISBN 978-0-8028-6241-9.
- Halley, Henry H. (1965). Halley's Bible Handbook: an abbreviated Bible commentary (24th (revised) ed.). Zondervan Publishing House. ISBN 0-310-25720-4.
- Hayes, Christine (2015). Introduction to the Bible. Yale University Press. ISBN 978-0-300-18827-1.
- Jones, Gwilym H. (2007). "12. 1 and 2 Samuel". In Barton, John; Muddiman, John (eds.). The Oxford Bible Commentary (first (paperback) ed.). Oxford University Press. pp. 196–232. ISBN 978-0-19-927718-6.
- Klein, R.W. (2003). "Samuel, books of". In Bromiley, Geoffrey W (ed.). The International Standard Bible Encyclopedia. Eerdmans. ISBN 978-0-8028-3784-4.
- Knight, Douglas A (1995). "Chapter 4 Deuteronomy and the Deuteronomists". In James Luther Mays, David L. Petersen and Kent Harold Richards (ed.). Old Testament Interpretation. T&T Clark. ISBN 978-0-567-29289-6.
- Ulrich, Eugene, ed. (2010). The Biblical Qumran Scrolls: Transcriptions and Textual Variants. Brill.
- Würthwein, Ernst (1995). The Text of the Old Testament. Translated by Rhodes, Erroll F. Grand Rapids, MI: Wm. B. Eerdmans. ISBN 0-8028-0788-7.
