= Geba (city) =

Former city in Palestine

Geba (/ˈɡiːbə/; Hebrew: גֶּבַע, Modern: Geva, Tiberian: Géḇaʻ; Greek: Γαβαα; Latin: Gabaa, lit. "the hill") was a city mentioned in the Hebrew Bible.

== Biblical sources ==
It was a Kohanic and Levitical city (Joshua 21:17, Nehemiah 11:31) located in the geographical territory of the Tribe of Benjamin on the northern border of Judah (2 Kings 23:8), adjacent to Ramah in Benjamin north of Gibeah (Isaiah 10:29; Joshua 18:24, 18:28).

During the wars in the time of Saul, Geba was held as a garrison by the Philistines (1 Samuel 13:3), but they were ejected by Jonathan.

During the reigns of Asa, king of Judah and Baasha, king of Israel, Geba was one of two cities that Asa built up from the stones Baasha had used to fortify Ramah (1 Kings 15:22; 2 Chronicles 16:6).

== Location ==
According to Josephus, "Gabao" was located 50 stadia from Jerusalem, as one ascended by Bethoron. Geba has been identified with Jaba', about 5½ miles north of Jerusalem.
