= Gibeah =

Biblical location in Israel

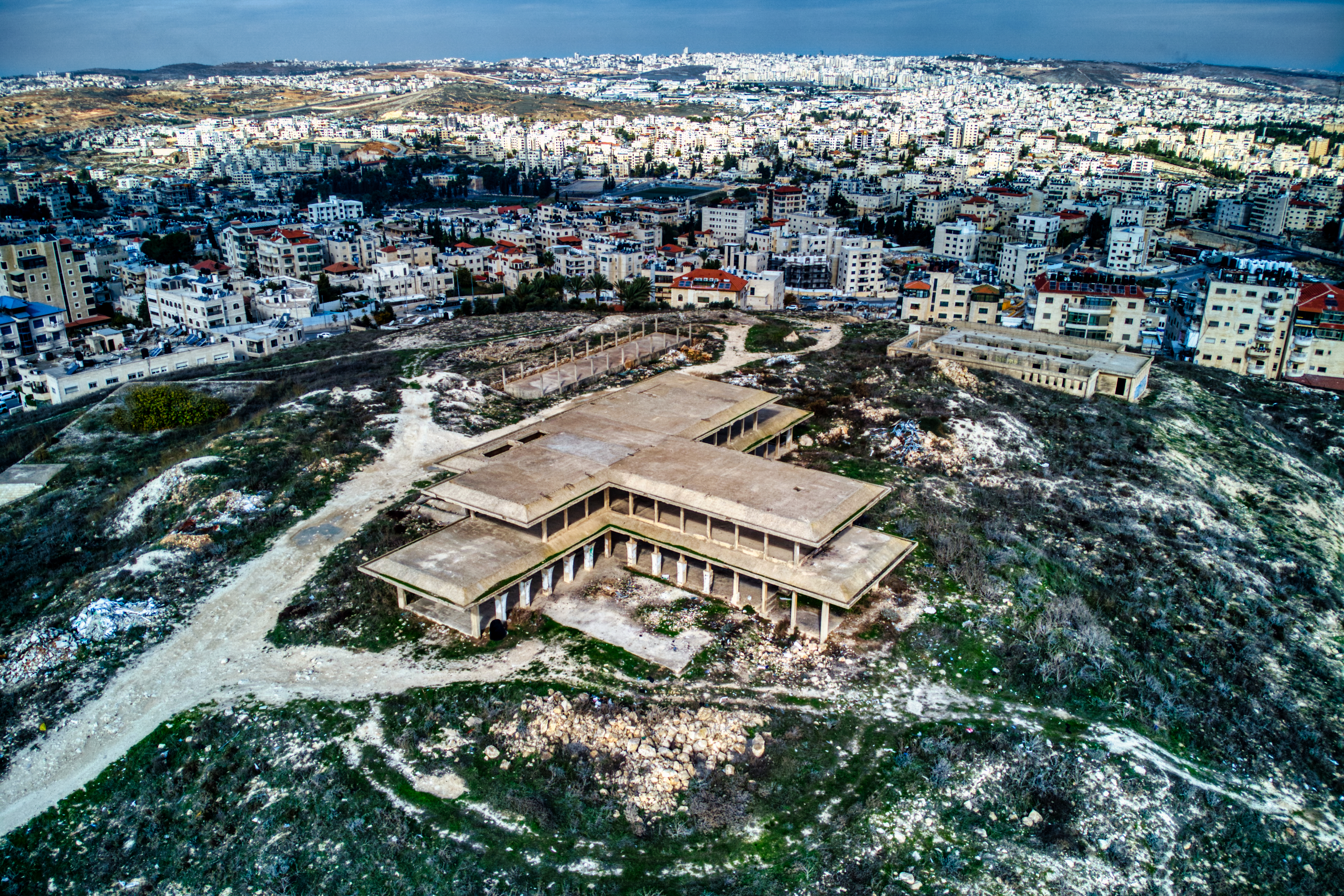
Tell el-Ful in northern Jerusalem is usually identified with Givah of Benjamin

Givah (/ˈɡɪbiə/; Hebrew: גִּבְעָה Gīḇəʿā; Hebrew: גִּבְעַת Gīvəʿaṯ) is the name of three places mentioned in the Hebrew Bible, in the tribes of Benjamin, Judah, and Ephraim respectively.

Givah of Benjamin, also Givah of Saul, is the most commonly mentioned of the places. In the Book of Judges, it is the main setting to the story of the Benjaminite War. Later, in the Book of Samuel, it is mentioned as the first capital of the united Kingdom of Israel under king Saul. During the First Jewish–Roman War, Titus established a camp nearby in the "Valley of Thorns", before proceeding to besiege Jerusalem.

Gibeah of Benjamin is generally identified with Tell el-Fūl in northern Jerusalem.

== Etymology ==
Gibeah is a Hebrew word meaning "hill" (Hebrew: גִּבְעָה, romanized: Giv'ah).

N29 D58 D36 G43
ḳbꜥw
in hieroglyphs
Era: New Kingdom
(1550–1069 BC)

== Gibeah of Benjamin ==
=== Biblical narrative ===
Gibeah in the tribe of Benjamin was the location of the infamous rape of the Levite's concubine, and the resulting Battle of Gibeah (Judges 19–21). Israel's first king, King Saul, reigned here for 22 years (1 Samuel 8–31). According to PEF explorer C.R. Conder, the name may have applied to a district as well as to a town, since the neighboring town of Ramah is said to have been "in Gibeah."

It is mentioned several times in later prophetic writings. Also known as Gibeat (Joshua 18:28). The name "Gibeah of God" (גִּבְעַת הָאֱלֹהִים, Give'at-elohim) may also refer to this Gibeah.

Perhaps to avoid confusion with other places named Gibeah, this location is also called "Gibeah of Benjamin" (גִּבְעַת בִּנְיָמִין, Give'at Binyamin) and "Gibeah of Saul" (גִּבְעַת שָׁאוּל, Give'at Sha'ul). The latter name is also used by the modern neighborhood Givat Shaul, which however is located in a different location.

=== In extra-biblical sources ===
According to Josephus, the 10th Roman Legion led by Titus camped in the "Valley of Thorns" (Acanthon Aulon) near Gabaothsaul before their siege of Jerusalem in AD 70. This valley is identified with the contemporary Wâdi Beit Hanina.

Jerome, writing in the late fourth and early fifth centuries, referred to Gibeah of Saul as an urbs usque ad solum diruta ("a town destroyed to the ground"), a description he repeats in similar formulations across multiple works, indicating that by his time the site was already in ruins.

=== Identification with Tell el-Ful ===
This Gibeah is generally identified with Tell el-Fūl (Arabic: تلّ الفول, lit. 'mound of fava beans'), a hill in the northern reaches of modern Jerusalem, on the outskirts of the Pisgat Ze'ev and Shuafat neighborhoods. This location is 3 miles (4.8 km) north of ancient Jerusalem, along the watershed ridge at 2,754 feet (839 m) above sea level. According to Josephus, Gabaothsaul was located about 30 stadia north of Jerusalem, which would have roughly corresponded with the location of Tell el-Fūl.

Jerome's descriptions of the location of the Gibeah of Saul support its identification with Tell el-Ful. In his account of the pilgrimage of Paula, he recounts that she traveled toward Jerusalem from the Beth-horon road, passing Aijalon and Gibeon, then Gibeah of Benjamin, before entering Jerusalem. This route corresponds to the Roman road system north of Jerusalem and is consistent with the location of Tell el-Ful. In another passage, in his commentary on Zephaniah, Jerome places Gibeah of Saul near Ramah. William F. Albright cited these passages as evidence that the identification of Tell el-Ful with biblical Gibeah was still remembered in Late Antiquity.

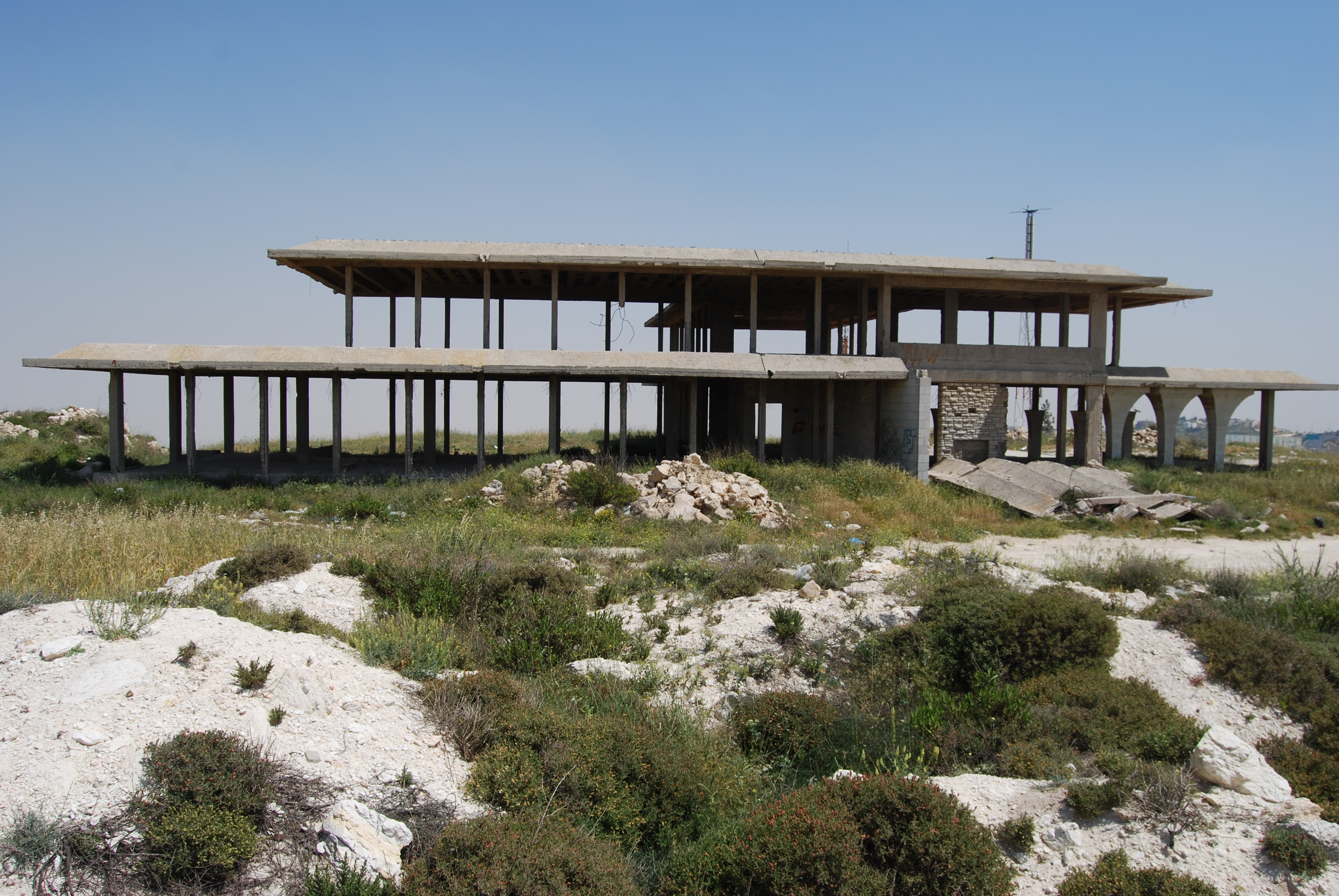
Unfinished Royal Palace of King Hussein of Jordan at Tell el-Ful.

Alternatively, Gibeah may have been where Jaba' now stands (9.12 kilometres (5.67 mi) north of Jerusalem), a view held by biblical scholar Edward Robinson and C. Umhau Wolf. Israel Finkelstein also challenged the identification with Tell el-Fūl. However, Jaba is now widely identified with the biblical city of Geba.

==== Archaeology ====
Tell el-Ful was first excavated in 1868 by Charles Warren, while C.R. Conder described the remains in 1874. William F. Albright led his first excavation from 1922 to 1923, and returned for a second season in 1923. His work was published in 1960. P.W. Lapp conducted a six-week salvage excavation in 1964. According to Kenneth Kitchen, "Upon this strategic point was found an Iron I occupation replaced (at an interval) by a fortress ("I"), subsequently refurbished ("II"), and then later in disuse. The oldest level may reflect the Gibeah of Judges 19–20. The excavations by Albright, checked by Lapp, would favor the view that it was Saul who built the first fortress, later repaired by him or David. The first fort (quadrangular) had at least one rectangular corner-tower at its southwest angle; it may have had others at the other corners, but no traces were detected."

The site was once more inhabited around the start of the Hellenistic period, and its wall was once more in service. The citadel underwent repairs as well in the second century BC. At the end of the second century BC, the site was abandoned.

King Hussein of Jordan began construction on a royal palace at Tell el-Ful, but construction was halted when the Six-Day War broke out. Since Israel won the war, King Hussein's palace was never finished and now all that remains is the skeleton of the building.

== Gibeah of Judah and Ephraim ==
Gibeah of Judah was a city in the tribal inheritance of Judah (Joshua 15:57); cities mentioned in nearby verses included Zanoah and Halhul. C. R. Conder identifies this Gibeah with Jab'a.

Gibeah of Ephraim was a city in the tribal inheritance of Ephraim, "the Gibeah of Phinehas" (Joshua 24:33); Eleazar, the son of Aaron, was buried here. Possibly Awarta.

== See also ==
- History of Ancient Israel and Judah
