= Gad (prophet) =

Seer or prophet mentioned in the Hebrew Bible

Gad (Hebrew: גָּד, Modern: Gad, Tiberian: Gāḏ, "luck", /ɡæd/) was a seer or prophet mentioned in the Hebrew Bible and the writings of Jewish historian Josephus. He was one of the personal prophets of King David of Israel and, according to the Talmudic tradition, some of his writings are believed to be included in the Books of Samuel. He is first mentioned in 1 Samuel 22:5 telling David to return from refuge in Moab to the forest of Hereth in the land of Judah.

The next biblical reference to Gad is 2 Samuel 24:11–13 (1 Chronicles 21:9–13) where, after David confesses his sin of taking a census of the people of Israel and Judah, God sends Gad to David to offer him a choice of three forms of punishment.

Gad is mentioned a final time in the Books of Samuel in 2 Samuel 24:18, coming to David and telling him to build an altar to God after God stops the plague that David had chosen as punishment. The place indicated by Gad for the altar is "in the threshing-floor of Araunah the Jebusite".

1 Chronicles 21:18–19 tells of an encounter Gad had with the angel of the Lord.

A tomb attributed to Gad is located at Halhul.

== The Chronicles of Gad the seer ==
The words, or chronicle, of Gad the seer are mentioned in 1 Chronicles 29:29 and are generally considered a lost text.
