= Khirbet esh-Shuna =

Archaeological site in the central West Bank

Coordinates: 32.088537°N 35.275040°E

- Kh. esh-Shuna
- Rock-cut bench tomb

- Location in the West Bank
- Type: Archaeological site (settlement)
- Etymology: Arabic shūna (شُونة), granary, barn or storehouse
- Periods: Iron Age, Hellenistic, Early Roman, Byzantine
- Location: South of Deir 'Ammar, central West Bank
- Region: Mount Ephraim (historical)

Site notes
- Elevation: 527 metres (1,729 ft)
- Area: 40 dunams (9.9 acres)
- Archaeologists: Israel Finkelstein; Eitan Klein; Hezki Bezalel; Dvir Raviv; Binyamin Har-Even; Evgeny Aharonovich; Aharon Tavger

Khirbet esh-Shuna (Arabic: خربة الشونة) is an archaeological site in the central West Bank, just south of Deir 'Ammar. It lies on a flat hilltop above the spring of 'Ayn Ayyub and covers approximately 40 dunams. The site features the remains of a large settlement dating primarily to the Iron Age and the Hellenistic, Early Roman and Byzantine periods. Iron Age remains include a large water reservoir and bell-shaped pits that may have been used for winemaking. The site also contains an unusual rock-cut bench tomb and eight hiding complexes constructed during the Jewish–Roman wars, one of which is described as the largest known in the hill country.

Archaeologists Eitan Klein and Hezki Bezalel have proposed identifying the Iron Age settlement with the ancient Israelite city of Ramathaim-Zophim, described in the Hebrew Bible as the hometown of Samuel and his father Elkanah. Dvir Raviv has proposed identifying the site's Hellenistic and Early Roman phases with the Second Temple-era town of Ramathaim, the center of a toparchy that, according to 1 Maccabees, was transferred from Samaria to Judea under Jonathan Apphus.

== Geography ==
Khirbet esh-Shuna is situated on a flat hilltop at an elevation of 527 metres (1,729 ft), approximately 1 kilometre (0.62 mi) south of Deir 'Ammar. The spring of 'Ayn Ayyub lies at its southern foot. A second ruin lies approximately 150 metres (490 ft) to the west, on an adjacent hill of roughly the same elevation. The two sites are connected by a broad saddle only about 10 metres (33 ft) below their summits. Together they cover approximately 40 dunams.

== Archaeology ==
Khirbet esh-Shuna contains the remains of a large settlement dating from the Iron Age to the Byzantine period. The Iron Age II is particularly well represented among the potsherds recovered. The site features approximately 50 bell-shaped rock-cut pits, arranged in three main clusters. The pits lack plaster, making their original function uncertain. However, their form and spatial arrangement closely resemble the Iron Age underground wine-storage pits commonly known as "Gibeon pits". Their concentration suggests that viticulture and winemaking were important activities at the site during the Iron Age.

A large underground reservoir is located on the southern slope of the site. Its irregular, oval main chamber has plastered walls and an estimated capacity of about 350 cubic metres (12,000 cu ft). The reservoir was originally accessed through a sloping tunnel 13 metres (43 ft) long. Including the tunnel, the reservoir's total capacity is estimated at approximately 400 cubic metres (14,000 cu ft). A small mikveh (Jewish ritual bath) with a dromos and underground chamber has also been identified at the site.

Eight hiding complexes were found at the site. One of them is especially extensive, over 100 metres (330 ft) long, and is described by Dvir Raviv as the largest known hiding complex of its kind in the hill country. It contains concealed chambers, passages, and large rock-cut halls that may have served for storage and shelter, and it incorporates some of the earlier rock-cut installations. Most of the pottery finds date to the period of the Jewish revolts against Rome.

The site also contains an unusual rock-cut bench tomb, with benches carved into rectangular wall niches decorated with stepped frames. Tombs of this type are associated with the Iron Age and continued to be used into the Second Temple period, apparently remaining popular before the widespread adoption of the characteristic kokh burial caves.

== Research history ==
The earliest possible description of the site is by Victor Guérin, who visited a ruin near Deir 'Ammar in 1863 that may be Khirbet esh-Shuna. He recorded cisterns and building remains spread over two neighboring hills, which he took to belong to a single ancient settlement. The site was later recorded as Khurbet el-Meidân by the surveyors of the Survey of Western Palestine, who also noted caves to its west.

In more recent decades, Israel Finkelstein and his colleagues surveyed Khirbet esh-Shuna as part of the Southern Samaria Survey, and in 2009 it was surveyed by Eitan Klein and Hezki Bezalel. In 2015, the site was surveyed again as part of the New Southern Samaria Survey, conducted by Bar-Ilan University and Ariel University in cooperation with the Archaeological Staff Officer of Judea and Samaria and led by Dvir Raviv, Binyamin Har-Even, Evgeny Aharonovich, and Aharon Tavger.

== Name and identification ==
In Arabic, shūna (شُونة) generally refers to a granary, barn or storehouse. The Survey of Western Palestine recorded the site as Khurbet el-Meidân (خربة الميدان), which its name lists explain as "the ruin of the plain or exercise ground". Klein and Bezalel suggest that local inhabitants coined this name because of the flat top of the site or the level ridge on which the two hills stand.

In 1997, Moshe Garsiel proposed identifying Khirbet esh-Shuna with the biblical site of Shen, mentioned in 1 Samuel 7:12 as one of the landmarks between which Samuel erected the Ebenezer stone. He based this identification on the site's Iron Age remains and on the phonetic resemblance between its Arabic name, al-Shuna, and the biblical name Shen.

Klein and Bezalel, however, rejected this identification. They argued that the Arabic name may not preserve an ancient Hebrew toponym, but could instead have been coined by local fellahin in reference to the pits visible at the site, which the fellahin may have understood as granaries. They proposed instead identifying Khirbet esh-Shuna with Ramathaim-Zophim (Hebrew: רָמָתַיִים צוֹפִים; or, in short, Ramah, הָרָמָה), a place mentioned in the Hebrew Bible as the home of Samuel and his father, Elkanah. Biblical references place the town in Mount Ephraim, in the region known as the land of Zuph, and indicate that it stood on elevated ground near a high place.

Yoel Elitzur proposed locating the land of Zuph and biblical Ramathaim-Zophim in the western Bethel hills. He understands Ramathaim-Zophim as "Ramah of Zuph", a form used to distinguish it from other places called Ramah. His proposal rests partly on the proximity of Beitillu, whose name may preserve the biblical name "Bethel", in this case Bethel in Ephraim (as opposed to the more famous Bethel in the east). Building on this proposal, Klein and Bezalel suggested identifying Ramathaim-Zophim specifically with Khirbet esh-Shuna. They cited the site's substantial size and status during the Iron Age, its high position (possibly spanning two adjacent hilltops, as hinted in the double form, Ramathaim), its occupation during the relevant periods, and its location in Mount Ephraim within a day's walk of Gibeah of Saul. Klein and Bezalel also noted the nearby Wadi esh-Shukh, suggesting that its name may preserve the name of Shoco, mentioned in the account of David's flight to Samuel at Ramah (1 Samuel 19:22).

Dvir Raviv proposed that Khirbet esh-Shuna and its surroundings should also be identified with Ramathaim, a regional administrative center during the Second Temple period. Ramathaim was one of three toparchies (with those of Lydda and Aphairema) that Seleucid king Demetrius II Nicator transferred from Samaria to Hasmonean Judea under Jonathan Apphus in the mid-2nd century BCE. Raviv suggested that placing Ramathaim in this area could explain why the district's administrative center was later moved to Timnah, about 5 kilometres (3.1 mi) to the north. Timnah was better suited to a district that had by then expanded northward.

Raviv further proposed that the ancient name of Ramathaim was lost because of a prolonged settlement gap in the western Bethel hills after the Bar Kokhba Revolt. Archaeological evidence indicates that Jewish settlement there declined sharply at the end of the revolt and was not renewed in the following period. The area was later inhabited by a non-Jewish population speaking Greek or Latin, and according to Raviv, this demographic and linguistic change disrupted the transmission of ancient toponyms. By contrast, southern Samaria was resettled relatively quickly by a Samaritan population that continued to speak a Semitic language, which helped preserve its ancient names.

== See also ==
- Khirbet Tibnah
- Khirbet el-Qureina

== Bibliography ==
=== Sources ===
- Klein, Eitan; Bezalel, Hezki (2013). "עיר מתקופת המקרא בח'רבת א־שונה ושאלת זיהויה של הרמתים צופים" [A City from the Biblical Period at Khirbet esh-Shune and the Question of Its Identification with Ramathaim-Zophim]. על אתר (in Hebrew). 17. מכללת הרצוג: 7–33.
- Palmer, Edward Henry (1881). The Survey of Western Palestine: Arabic and English Name Lists. London: Committee of the Palestine Exploration Fund. p. 235.
- Raviv, Dvir; Har-Even, Benjamin; Aharonovich, Evgeny; Tavger, Aharon (2018). "The New Southern Samaria Survey—Selected Finds and Preliminary Conclusions". Qadmoniot: A Journal for the Antiquities of Eretz-Israel and Bible Lands (in Hebrew). 51 (156). Israel Exploration Society: 115–123.
- Raviv, Dvir (2021). "זיהויה של רמתים: בירת טופארכיה מן התקופה החשמונאית" [The Identification of Ramathaim: The Capital of a Toparchy in the Hasmonean Period] (PDF). מחקרי יהודה ושומרון (in Hebrew). 30 (1): 5–33. doi:10.26351/JSRS/30-1/1. ISSN 2617-8737.
