= 1 Samuel 9 =

First Book of Samuel chapter

- ← chapter 8 chapter 10 →
- The pages containing the Books of Samuel (1 & 2 Samuel) in Leningrad Codex (1008 CE).
- Book: First book of Samuel
- Hebrew Bible part: Nevi'im
- Order in the Hebrew part: 3
- Category: Former Prophets
- Christian Bible part: Old Testament
- Order in the Christian part: 9

1 Samuel 9 is the ninth chapter of the First Book of Samuel in the Old Testament of the Christian Bible or the first part of the Books of Samuel in the Hebrew Bible. According to Jewish tradition the book was attributed to the prophet Samuel, with additions by the prophets Gad and Nathan, but modern scholars view it as a composition of a number of independent texts of various ages from c. 630–540 BCE. This chapter describes the meeting between Saul and Samuel which led to Saul's first anointing as king (1 Samuel 10:1–16), within a section comprising 1 Samuel 7–15 which records the rise of the monarchy in Israel and the account of the first years of King Saul.

== Text ==
This chapter was originally written in the Hebrew language. It is divided into 27 verses.

=== Textual witnesses ===
Some early manuscripts containing the text of this chapter in Hebrew are of the Masoretic Text tradition, which includes the Codex Cairensis (895), Aleppo Codex (10th century), and Codex Leningradensis (1008). Fragments containing parts of this chapter in Hebrew were found among the Dead Sea Scrolls including 4Q51 (4QSam^{a}; 100–50 BCE) with extant verses 6–8, 10–12, 16–24.

Extant ancient manuscripts of a translation into Koine Greek known as the Septuagint (originally was made in the last few centuries BCE) include Codex Vaticanus (B; $\mathfrak{G}$^{B}; 4th century) and Codex Alexandrinus (A; $\mathfrak{G}$^{A}; 5th century). (Note: The whole book of 1 Samuel is missing from the extant Codex Sinaiticus.)

== Analysis ==
This chapter introduces Saul, who was to be the first king of Israel, as a resolution to the request for a king left unfinished in the previous chapter. The narrative bears some features of folk-tales: a young man setting out to find his father's missing donkeys comes out as designated king. Saul's search led him to the prophet Samuel, who privately anointed Saul as king and provided three signs as confirmation to its legitimacy, all of which were fulfilled in 1 Samuel 10:2–7. Throughout the account, Saul appeared to be humble, but also showed lack of confidence and perhaps doubts about his calling to kingship.

== Saul's genealogy (9:1–2) ==
The listing of Saul's ancestry in the beginning of this chapter recalls the opening of the Books of Samuel (1 Samuel 1:1) which delineates Samuel's genealogy. In both genealogies Samuel and Saul are listed in the sixth position. The connection of Samuel's name to the word "asked" (Hebrew: shaul) in 1 Samuel 1:28 may also relate to the name of Saul (Hebrew: shaul) Saul's genealogy has two noteworthy features:

1. Saul's father has an attribute of a "man of standing" (see 1 Samuel 9:1), so Saul came from a well-to-do family.
2. Saul is from the tribe of Benjamin, which descended from Jacob's youngest son, Benjamin, and not long before this time had almost been annihilated because of their horrific actions (Judges 19–21).

These may emphasize God's direct participation in the events that Saul, a youth belonging to the smallest of the Israel tribes and the humblest of families (9:21) was endowed with extraordinary characteristics (9:2) to be elected as the first king of Israel.

=== Verse 1 ===
Now there was a man of Benjamin, whose name was Kish, the son of Abiel, the son of Zeror, the son of Bechorath, the son of Aphiah, a Benjamite, a mighty man of power.

- Cross reference: Genesis 46:21; 1 Samuel 14:51; 1 Chronicles 7:6–8; 1 Chronicles 8:29–33; 1 Chronicles 9:35–39
- "Of Benjamite": in Hebrew is written (ketiv) as מבן ימין and read (qere) as מבנימין.
- "A Benjamite": in Hebrew is written as בן־איש ימיני, ben-’îš yə-mî-nî
- "A mighty man of power": attributed to Kish, Saul's father; translated from Hebrew גבור חיל, gi-bōr ḥā-yil, which may mean (1) a valiant man, as in 1 Samuel 16:18, or (2) a wealthy man as in Ruth 2:1, or the combined idea of personal valor and family importance ("a man of standing" in NIV), rendered in the Septuagint ἀνὴρ δυνατός, "a powerful man",

Some ancestors seem to be omitted, among whom are Matri, mentioned in 1 Samuel 10:21; and Jehiel, mentioned in 1 Chronicles 9:35 (cf. 1 Chronicles 8:29), who was described as the first settler and coloniser of Gibeon, and as the husband of Maachah, a daughter or granddaughter of Caleb. An ancestor of Saul could have been among the 600 men of Benjamin who escaped to the rock Rimmon during the slaughter of the whole tribe by the other tribes of Israel (Judges 20:47–21:1).

== Samuel and Saul meet (9:3–27) ==
Saul was told by his father, Kish, to look for their stray donkeys, so he and a servant went through the hill country of Ephraim until they arrived in the land of Zuph (9:5). The servant persuaded Saul to visit a nameless seer (9:6–10), who was unfamiliar to them (cf. 9:18), and turned out to be Samuel (9:14, 19). A day before Samuel had been told by YHWH that the chosen man would come to him (9:16). God commanded Samuel to anoint Saul not as "king" (Hebrew: melek), but "ruler" (Hebrew: nagid; "prince"), in contrast to the instruction for Samuel to anoint David as "king" in 1 Samuel 16:1. After God clearly pointed Saul to Samuel ("Behold the man"; 1 Samuel 9:17), the prophet introduced himself to Saul as the seer and demonstrated his credentials by accurately speaking about Saul's donkeys. Saul was invited by Samuel to a meal and given a choice of meat which had been set aside for Saul beforehand, again indicating that the meeting was not coincidental. This "pre-coronation meal" was similar to the one organized later when Samuel anointed David (a meal and invited guests; 9:22). Samuel did not use the occasion of the dinner to anoint Saul, but waited instead until the next morning (as described in 1 Samuel 10).

=== Verse 3 ===
Now the donkeys of Kish, the father of Saul, were lost. And Kish said to his son Saul, "Take now one of the servants with you, and arise, go find the donkeys."

- "Donkeys" the Hebrew word denotes "female donkeys", can be used for riding (Judges 10:4) and kept for breeding; they were not as confined as the males, so they could stray away.
- "Servants": translated from a Hebrew plural noun derived from the root word naar, which literally means "young boy", but in this context, it implies "servants" and need not to be young of age.

The Syriac Peshitta version has additional words: "So Saul arose and went out. He took with him one of the boys and went out to look for his father's donkeys."

=== Verse 5 ===
When they had come to the land of Zuph, Saul said to his servant who was with him, "Come, let us return, lest my father cease caring about the donkeys and become worried about us.

- "Land of Zuph": a district where Samuel's city, Ramathaim-Zophim, was located (cf. 1 Samuel 1:1), in similar locality as Mount Ephraim; probably so named after Zuph or (Zophai in 1 Chronicles 6:26).

=== Verse 27 ===
As they were going down to the outskirts of the city, Samuel said to Saul, “Tell the servant to go on ahead of us.” And he went on. “But you stand here awhile, that I may announce to you the word of God.”

- "And he went on": This statement is found in Masoretic Text, as well as an Old Latin manuscript, and the Syriac Peshitta, but generally missing from Greek Septuagint version, except of Origen.
- "Awhile":or "now"

== See also ==
- Abiel
- Aphiah
- Bechorath
- King
- Mount Ephraim
- Philistines
- Prophet
- Shalim
- Shalisha
- Shekel
- Silver
- Tribe of Benjamin
- Zeror
- Zuph
- Related Bible parts: 1 Samuel 1, 1 Samuel 8, 1 Samuel 10

== Sources ==
=== Commentaries on Samuel ===
- Auld, Graeme (2003). "1 & 2 Samuel". In James D. G. Dunn and John William Rogerson (ed.). Eerdmans Commentary on the Bible. Eerdmans. ISBN 9780802837110.
- Bergen, David T. (1996). 1, 2 Samuel. B&H Publishing Group. ISBN 9780805401073.
- Chapman, Stephen B. (2016). 1 Samuel as Christian Scripture: A Theological Commentary. Wm. B. Eerdmans Publishing Company. ISBN 978-1467445160.
- Evans, Paul (2018). Longman, Tremper (ed.). 1-2 Samuel. The Story of God Bible Commentary. Zondervan Academic. ISBN 978-0310490944.
- Gordon, Robert (1986). I & II Samuel, A Commentary. Paternoster Press. ISBN 9780310230229.
- Hertzberg, Hans Wilhelm (1964). I & II Samuel, A Commentary (trans. from German 2nd edition 1960 ed.). Westminster John Knox Press. p. 19. ISBN 978-0664223182.
- Tsumura, David Toshio (2007). The First Book of Samuel. Eerdmans. ISBN 9780802823595.

=== General ===
- Breytenbach, Andries (2000). "Who Is Behind The Samuel Narrative?". In Johannes Cornelis de Moor and H.F. Van Rooy (ed.). Past, Present, Future: the Deuteronomistic History and the Prophets. Brill. ISBN 9789004118713.
- Coogan, Michael David (2007). Coogan, Michael David; Brettler, Marc Zvi; Newsom, Carol Ann; Perkins, Pheme (eds.). The New Oxford Annotated Bible with the Apocryphal/Deuterocanonical Books: New Revised Standard Version, Issue 48 (Augmented 3rd ed.). Oxford University Press. ISBN 978-0195288810.
- Fitzmyer, Joseph A. (2008). A Guide to the Dead Sea Scrolls and Related Literature. Grand Rapids, MI: William B. Eerdmans Publishing Company. ISBN 9780802862419.
- Halley, Henry H. (1965). Halley's Bible Handbook: an abbreviated Bible commentary (24th (revised) ed.). Zondervan Publishing House. ISBN 0-310-25720-4.
- Hayes, Christine (2015). Introduction to the Bible. Yale University Press. ISBN 978-0300188271.
- Jones, Gwilym H. (2007). "12. 1 and 2 Samuel". In Barton, John; Muddiman, John (eds.). The Oxford Bible Commentary (first (paperback) ed.). Oxford University Press. pp. 196–232. ISBN 978-0199277186.
- Klein, R.W. (2003). "Samuel, books of". In Bromiley, Geoffrey W (ed.). The International Standard Bible Encyclopedia. Eerdmans. ISBN 9780802837844.
- Knight, Douglas A (1995). "Chapter 4 Deuteronomy and the Deuteronomists". In James Luther Mays, David L. Petersen and Kent Harold Richards (ed.). Old Testament Interpretation. T&T Clark. ISBN 9780567292896.
- Ulrich, Eugene, ed. (2010). The Biblical Qumran Scrolls: Transcriptions and Textual Variants. Brill.
- Würthwein, Ernst (1995). The Text of the Old Testament. Translated by Rhodes, Erroll F. Grand Rapids, MI: Wm. B. Eerdmans. ISBN 0-8028-0788-7.
