= 1 Samuel 1 =

First Book of Samuel chapter

- ← Ruth 4 chapter 2 →
- The pages containing the Books of Samuel (1 & 2 Samuel) in Leningrad Codex (1008 CE).
- Book: First book of Samuel
- Hebrew Bible part: Nevi'im
- Order in the Hebrew part: 3
- Category: Former Prophets
- Christian Bible part: Old Testament
- Order in the Christian part: 9

1 Samuel 1 is the first chapter of the First Book of Samuel in the Old Testament of the Christian Bible or the first part of the Books of Samuel in the Hebrew Bible. According to Jewish tradition the book was attributed to the prophet Samuel, with additions by the prophets Gad and Nathan, but many modern scholars view it as a composition of a number of independent texts of various ages from c. 630–540 BCE. Chapters 1 to 7 of 1 Samuel depict Samuel's life: this chapter focuses on his birth.

== Text ==
This chapter was originally written in the Hebrew language. It is divided into 28 verses.

=== Textual witnesses ===
Some early manuscripts containing the text of this chapter in Hebrew are of the Masoretic Text tradition, which includes the Codex Cairensis (895), Aleppo Codex (10th century), and Codex Leningradensis (1008). Fragments containing parts of this chapter in Hebrew were found among the Dead Sea Scrolls, that is, 6Q4 (6QpapKgs; 150–75 BCE) with extant verses 28–31.

Extant ancient manuscripts of a translation into Koine Greek known as the Septuagint (originally was made in the last few centuries BCE) include Codex Vaticanus (B; $\mathfrak{G}$^{B}; 4th century) and Codex Alexandrinus (A; $\mathfrak{G}$^{A}; 5th century). (Note: The whole book of 1 Samuel is missing from the extant Codex Sinaiticus.)

=== Old Testament references ===
- 1 Samuel 1:1–8: Psalm 113:1–9
- 1 Samuel 1:3,7,21: Deuteronomy 12:5–7 (annual pilgrimage)
- 1 Samuel 1:11: Numbers 6:1–21 (Nazirite vow)
- 1 Samuel 1:21–23: Numbers 30:10–15 (husband's approval of wife's vow)
- 1 Samuel 1:24: Numbers 15:9–10 (offerings of bull, flour and wine)
Places mentioned in this chapter

== Period ==
- The event in this chapter happened at the end of judges period in Israel, about 1100 BC.

== Elkanah's family (1:1–8) ==
Elkanah came from a prestigious Levite family in Ramah (verse 1) in the land of Zuph (cf. 1 Samuel 9:5–6). Elkanah's first wife, Hannah, was barren so he had decided to take a second wife, Peninnah (cf. Genesis 16:1–4). When Peninnah had children, tension and rivalry arose between the two women, with Hannah being constantly provoked and distressed. The inability of Elkanah to control the situation of his wives pushes Hannah to take the initiative, especially when her plight was made more obvious by receiving only one portion of the sacrifice (verse 5). The opportunity came when Elkanah and his family attended the annual worship feast in Shiloh (Judges 21:19–24), one of the most important sanctuaries and the home of the ark (1 Samuel 3:3), which was regulated by the high priest Eli and his two sons.

=== Verse 1 ===
Now there was a certain man of Ramathaimzophim, of mount Ephraim, and his name was Elkanah, the son of Jeroham, the son of Elihu, the son of Tohu, the son of Zuph, an Ephrathite:

- "Ramathaimzophim": can be translated as "Ramathaim" in the "district of Zuph". A "land of Zuph" was mentioned only once in 1 Samuel 9:5, an area in which Samuel is said to have been found. Greek Septuagint renders the phrase as "a man from Ramathaim, a Zuphite". The name "Ramathaim" means "the two heights" is found in the whole Bible only in this verse, and without doubt points to Ramah (meaning "the height"), which is the birthplace (1 Samuel 1:19), residence (1 Samuel 7:17), and burial-place (1 Samuel 25:1) of Samuel. The city has been identified with Arimathea of the New Testament
- Elkanah: literally, "God is owner", from his genealogy is known to belong to the Kohathites (cf. 1 Chronicles 6:3–15), one of the three divisions of the Levites.
- "Elihu" (meaning "God is he") written as "Eliel" ("God is God") in 1 Chronicles 6:34.
- "Tohu": written as "Toah" in 1 Chronicles 6:34.
- "Zuph": apparently had moved from the land of Ephraim, one of the three tribes (Ephraim, Manasseh, Dan) to which the Kohathites were traditionally attached. He is called "an Ephrathite" (or "Ephraimite"; cf. Judges 12:5), apparently following the practice to acknowledge Levites in relation to the tribes to which they were attached (cf. Judges 17:7). He seems to be a prominent person to have his new home to be named after him, called the "land of Zuph" in 1 Samuel 9:5, his descendants called "the Zophim", with Ramah as the center, and Elkanah, as the head of the family at this time, known as a man of wealth and influence.

=== Verse 2 ===
And he had two wives; the name of the one was Hannah, and the name of the other Peninnah: and Peninnah had children, but Hannah had no children.

- "Two wives": cf. Lamech, of the lineage of Cain (Genesis 4:19). This practice was tolerated by the law (Deuteronomy 21:15–17), and recorded in the family of Jacob (Genesis 29), Ashur (1 Chronicles 4:5), Shaharaim (1 Chronicles 8:8), David (1 Samuel 25:43), Joash (2 Chronicles 24:3), and others, but gradually became less frequent until there was no case on record in the Bible after the Captivity.
- "Hannah": means "beauty" or "charm" or "grace"; the Greek rendering is the same as "Anna" (cf. Luke 2:36).
- "Peninnah" means "a pearl" or "coral" (cf. Job 28:18). The root word of the name probably denotes "red pearl" because it was translated as "ruby" in Proverbs 3:15 and Lamentations 4:7.

=== Verse 3 ===
Now this man used to go up year by year from his city to worship and to sacrifice to the Lord of hosts at Shiloh, where the two sons of Eli, Hophni and Phin'ehas, were priests of the Lord.

Targum: From the solemn appointed feast to the solemn appointed feast, similarly translated by Robert Young as "from time to time", although generally as "yearly" or "year to year" in other English translations.

== The birth of Samuel (1:9–28) ==
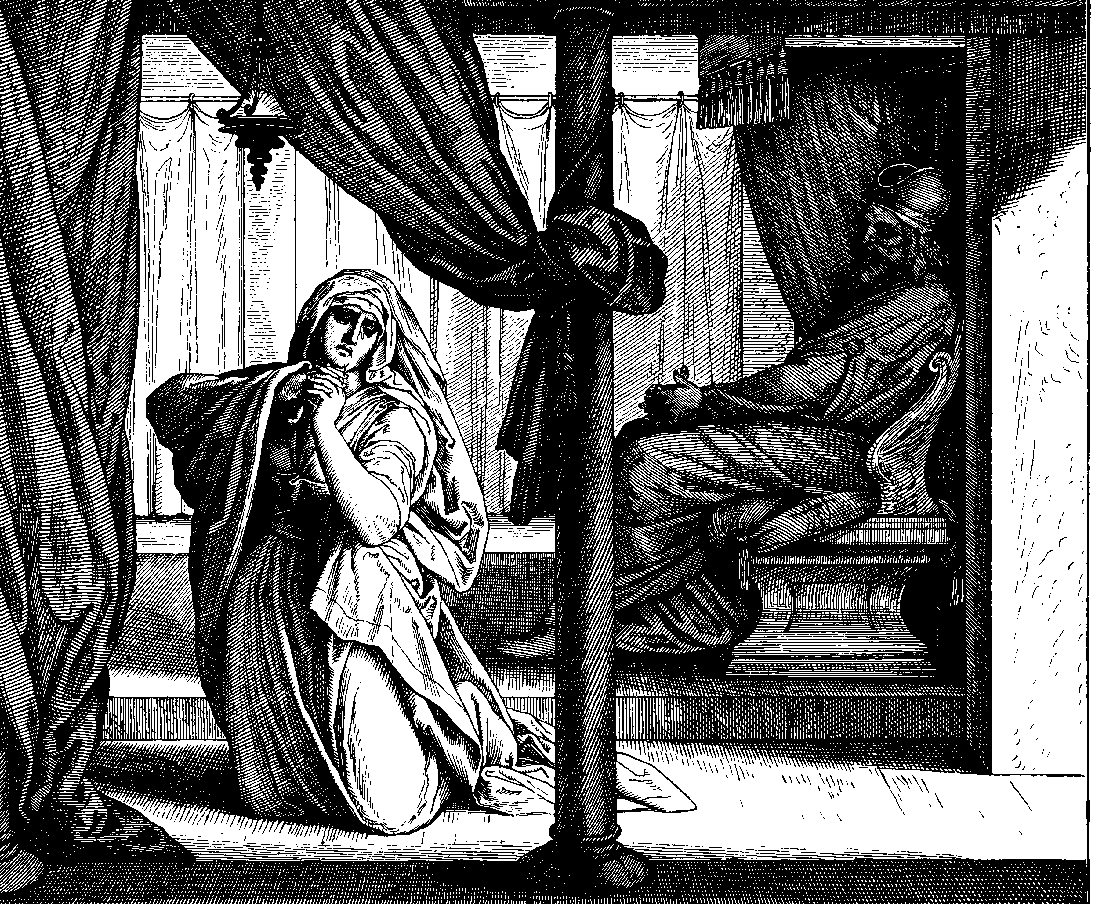
Hannah's prayer, 1860 woodcut by Julius Schnorr von Karolsfeld

Hannah took the initiative to make a vow that the son she requested would be dedicated as a nazirite (verse 11). The Masoretic Text only mentions "a razor will not go up upon his head" (meaning "leaving the hair uncut") as one feature of the nazirite vow, but the longer text in the Greek version of Septuagint (supported in some parts by 4QSam^{a} among the Dead Sea Scrolls) mentions "wine and strong drink he will not drink" (cf. Numbers 6:1–21; Judges 13:5, 7) as another feature of a nazirite. Hannah delayed her visit until Samuel had been weaned, then she brought the child to Shiloh to 'abide there forever' (4QSam^{a} clarifies that Hannah was dedicating Samuel as a nazirite), with the bull offerings as well as flour and wine (cf. Numbers 15:8–10).

A repeated wordplay on the Hebrew root word שָׁאַל sha'al (to ask, request) has been found in this passage: 'that thou hast asked of him' (verse 17), 'I have asked him of the Lord' (verse 20), 'which I asked of him' (verse 27), 'I have lent him to the Lord; as long as he liveth he shall be lent to the Lord' (verse 28). Verse 20 links the name of the child to this word: Hannah named the child Samuel, saying, "Because I have asked for him from the Lord".

=== Verse 21 ===
And the man Elkanah, and all his house, went up to offer unto the Lord the yearly sacrifice, and his vow.

- "His vow": the Hebrew suffix could also be translated as "its vow", referring to "his household's vow", which could be Hannah's vow, because according to Numbers 30:6–8 a husband could nullify or allow his wife's vow to stand.

The Greek Septuagint has an addition "and all the tithes of his land" to this verse.

=== Verse 24 ===
Now when she had weaned him, she took him up with her, with three bulls, one ephah of flour, and a skin of wine, and brought him to the house of the Lord in Shiloh. And the child was young.

- "Three bulls": based on the Masoretic Text, whereas 4QSam^{a} and the Septuagint and Syriac versions have "a three-year-old bull". Verse 25 mentions that one bull was offered as the burnt offering to consecrate Samuel to God, so one more bull could be for the "sacrifice in performing a vow" and the third one for a peace-offering (cf. Numbers 15:8).
- "Ephah": about 3/5 bushel or 22 liters

== See also ==
- Eli
- Hophni and Phinehas
- Jeroham
- Korban
- Mount Ephraim
- Nazirite
- Ramah in Benjamin
- Related Bible parts: Numbers 6, Numbers 15, Numbers 30, 1 Samuel 2, 1 Chronicles 6

== Sources ==
=== Commentaries on Samuel ===
- Auld, Graeme (2003). "1 & 2 Samuel". In James D. G. Dunn and John William Rogerson (ed.). Eerdmans Commentary on the Bible. Eerdmans. ISBN 9780802837110.
- Bergen, David T. (1996). 1, 2 Samuel. B&H Publishing Group. ISBN 9780805401073.
- Gordon, Robert P. (1999). I & II Samuel, A Commentary. Zondervan. ISBN 978-0310230229.
- Hertzberg, Hans Wilhelm (1964). I & II Samuel, A Commentary (trans. from German 2nd edition 1960 ed.). Westminster John Knox Press. p. 19. ISBN 978-0664223182.
- Tsumura, David Toshio (2007). The First Book of Samuel. Eerdmans. ISBN 9780802823595.

=== General ===
- Breytenbach, Andries (2000). "Who Is Behind The Samuel Narrative?". In Johannes Cornelis de Moor and H.F. Van Rooy (ed.). Past, Present, Future: the Deuteronomistic History and the Prophets. Brill. ISBN 9789004118713.
- Coogan, Michael David (2007). Coogan, Michael David; Brettler, Marc Zvi; Newsom, Carol Ann; Perkins, Pheme (eds.). The New Oxford Annotated Bible with the Apocryphal/Deuterocanonical Books: New Revised Standard Version, Issue 48 (Augmented 3rd ed.). Oxford University Press. ISBN 978-0195288810.
- Fitzmyer, Joseph A. (2008). A Guide to the Dead Sea Scrolls and Related Literature. Grand Rapids, MI: William B. Eerdmans Publishing Company. ISBN 9780802862419.
- Halley, Henry H. (1965). Halley's Bible Handbook: an abbreviated Bible commentary (24th (revised) ed.). Zondervan Publishing House. ISBN 0-310-25720-4.
- Hayes, Christine (2015). Introduction to the Bible. Yale University Press. ISBN 978-0300188271.
- Jones, Gwilym H. (2007). "12. 1 and 2 Samuel". In Barton, John; Muddiman, John (eds.). The Oxford Bible Commentary (first (paperback) ed.). Oxford University Press. pp. 196–232. ISBN 978-0199277186.
- Klein, R.W. (2003). "Samuel, books of". In Bromiley, Geoffrey W (ed.). The International Standard Bible Encyclopedia. Eerdmans. ISBN 9780802837844.
- Knight, Douglas A (1995). "Chapter 4 Deuteronomy and the Deuteronomists". In James Luther Mays, David L. Petersen and Kent Harold Richards (ed.). Old Testament Interpretation. T&T Clark. p. 62. ISBN 9780567292896.
- Ulrich, Eugene, ed. (2010). The Biblical Qumran Scrolls: Transcriptions and Textual Variants. Brill.
- Würthwein, Ernst (1995). The Text of the Old Testament. Translated by Rhodes, Erroll F. Grand Rapids, MI: Wm. B. Eerdmans. ISBN 0-8028-0788-7.
