= 1 Samuel 8 =

First Book of Samuel chapter

- ← chapter 7 chapter 9 →
- The pages containing the Books of Samuel (1 & 2 Samuel) in Leningrad Codex (1008 CE).
- Book: First book of Samuel
- Hebrew Bible part: Nevi'im
- Order in the Hebrew part: 3
- Category: Former Prophets
- Christian Bible part: Old Testament
- Order in the Christian part: 9

1 Samuel 8 is the eighth chapter of the First Book of Samuel in the Old Testament of the Christian Bible or the first part of the Books of Samuel in the Hebrew Bible. According to Jewish tradition the book was attributed to the prophet Samuel, with additions by the prophets Gad and Nathan, but modern scholars view it as a composition of a number of independent texts of various ages from c. 630–540 BCE. This chapter records the request from the elders of Israel to Samuel for a king, part of a section comprising 1 Samuel 7–15 which records the rise of the monarchy in Israel and the account of the first years of King Saul.

== Text ==
This chapter was originally written in the Hebrew language. It is divided into 22 verses.

=== Textual witnesses ===
Some early manuscripts containing the text of this chapter in Hebrew are of the Masoretic Text tradition, which includes the Codex Cairensis (895), Aleppo Codex (10th century), and Codex Leningradensis (1008). Fragments containing parts of this chapter in Hebrew were found among the Dead Sea Scrolls including 4Q51 (4QSam^{a}; 100–50 BCE) with extant verses 7, 9–14, 16–20.

Extant ancient manuscripts of a translation into Koine Greek known as the Septuagint (originally was made in the last few centuries BCE) include Codex Vaticanus (B; $\mathfrak{G}$^{B}; 4th century) and Codex Alexandrinus (A; $\mathfrak{G}$^{A}; 5th century). (Note: The whole book of 1 Samuel is missing from the extant Codex Sinaiticus.)

== Places ==
Places mentioned in this chapter
- Beersheba
- Ramah

== Analysis ==
This chapter records the elders of Israel's request for a king and reports their persistence despite the warning from Samuel regarding the 'oppressive ways of kings'. One reason for the quest for a king was that Samuel's sons were unfit to succeed him (verses 3, 5), because they perverted justice in Beersheba, recalling the behavior of Eli's sons. One more explicit reason was that the people wished to be governed 'like other nations' (cf. Deuteronomy 17:14) with supposedly better military advantages (verse 20), than a new line of judges.

The antimonarchial stance was given in three different sections of this chapter:

1. the proposal displeased Samuel and was regarded by Yahweh as a rejection of himself, instead of Samuel (verses 6–9)
2. Samuel gave a negative view of 'the ways of the king' (verses 10–17), such as the conscription of personnel for military duties (verses 11–12a) and for labor (verse 12b–13), the confiscation of property and provisions for maintaining a court (verses 14–15), and the confiscation of stock (verse 16, reading 'cattle' with LXX in preference to 'young men' in the MT). Akkadian texts from Ras Shamra testify to many of the practices listed in verses 11–17. The practice was listed during Solomon's reign in 1 Kings 10–11.
3. The kingship was reluctantly permitted, tolerated rather than approved (cf. verse 7), because of Israel's determination (verses 19–21).

The narrative further harmonized two opposing views: (1) the monarchy was not approved by Yahweh, but (2) Yahweh himself was responsible for selecting the first kings of Israel.

== Samuel's sons (8:1–3) ==
When Samuel was at old age (verse 1), his sons, who were appointed as judges, became corrupt (verse 2). This draws a parallel to Samuel's mentor, Eli, whose sons became corrupt at Eli's old age (1 Samuel 2:22), leading to prophetic judgments on his family, Israel's defeat and loss of ark to the Philistines (1 Samuel 4). In the case of Samuel, the corruption of his sons led to the elders of Israel requesting for a king.

=== Verse 2 ===
Now the name of his firstborn was Joel; and the name of his second, Abiah: they were judges in Beersheba.

- Cross reference: 1 Chronicles 6:28
- "Beersheba": located on the southernmost frontier of Judah, implying the recovery of the territory from the Philistines (1 Samuel 7:14). The placement of Samuel's sons here is supported by the writing of Josephus (from 1st century CE).

== The demand for a king (8:4–22) ==
The elders of Israel point to the corrupt ways of Samuel's sons and Samuel's old age as reasons to have a king like all 'other nations' (verse 5), contrary to God's declaration that Israel is 'above all the nations' (Deuteronomy 26:19) because they have YHWH as their king. This has once been brought out in Judges 8, when people asked Gideon to rule over them, but Gideon declined by saying that "the Lord will rule over you" (Judges 8:23). Samuel was deeply offended by the request, as verse 6 states the request "displeased" him (in Hebrew: 'this thing is evil in Samuel's eye'), because the request in Hebrew was literally for "a king to judge them", thereby attacking his lifelong role (and of his sons'). When Samuel 'prayed to the Lord' (that is, 'he laid the matter before the Lord in prayer'), God assured Samuel that the people did not reject Samuel personally but rejecting God's kingship over them. God did not seem surprised nor offended, instead quickly agreed to give the people a human king (verse 7), while explaining to Samuel that this behavior was consistent ever since God delivered the people in Exodus from Egypt until that time, in which the people tend to forsake God for false gods (verse 8). In fact, the Torah already anticipated and prepared specific instructions for this occasion (Deuteronomy 17:14–15).

=== Verse 7 ===
And the Lord said to Samuel, "Heed the voice of the people in all that they say to you; for they have not rejected you, but they have rejected Me, that I should not reign over them."

- "Should not reign over them": that is, the people did not even want a theocratic king, whose first duty would be to maintain the Torah (Deuteronomy 17:18, 19).

== See also ==
- Apostacy
- Biblical judges
- King
- Related Bible parts: Judges 8, 1 Samuel 2, 1 Samuel 3, 1 Samuel 7

== Sources ==
=== Commentaries on Samuel ===
- Auld, Graeme (2003). "1 & 2 Samuel". In James D. G. Dunn and John William Rogerson (ed.). Eerdmans Commentary on the Bible. Eerdmans. ISBN 978-0-8028-3711-0.
- Bergen, David T. (1996). 1, 2 Samuel. B&H Publishing Group. ISBN 978-0-8054-0107-3.
- Chapman, Stephen B. (2016). 1 Samuel as Christian Scripture: A Theological Commentary. Wm. B. Eerdmans Publishing Company. ISBN 978-1-4674-4516-0.
- Evans, Paul (2018). Longman, Tremper (ed.). 1-2 Samuel. The Story of God Bible Commentary. Zondervan Academic. ISBN 978-0-310-49094-4.
- Gordon, Robert (1986). I & II Samuel, A Commentary. Paternoster Press. ISBN 978-0-310-23022-9.
- Hertzberg, Hans Wilhelm (1964). I & II Samuel, A Commentary (trans. from German 2nd edition 1960 ed.). Westminster John Knox Press. p. 19. ISBN 978-0-664-22318-2.
- Tsumura, David Toshio (2007). The First Book of Samuel. Eerdmans. ISBN 978-0-8028-2359-5.

=== General ===
- Breytenbach, Andries (2000). "Who Is Behind The Samuel Narrative?". In Johannes Cornelis de Moor and H.F. Van Rooy (ed.). Past, Present, Future: the Deuteronomistic History and the Prophets. Brill. ISBN 9789004118713.
- Coogan, Michael David (2007). Coogan, Michael David; Brettler, Marc Zvi; Newsom, Carol Ann; Perkins, Pheme (eds.). The New Oxford Annotated Bible with the Apocryphal/Deuterocanonical Books: New Revised Standard Version, Issue 48 (Augmented 3rd ed.). Oxford University Press. ISBN 978-0-19-528881-0.
- Fitzmyer, Joseph A. (2008). A Guide to the Dead Sea Scrolls and Related Literature. Grand Rapids, MI: William B. Eerdmans Publishing Company. ISBN 978-0-8028-6241-9.
- Halley, Henry H. (1965). Halley's Bible Handbook: an abbreviated Bible commentary (24th (revised) ed.). Zondervan Publishing House. ISBN 0-310-25720-4.
- Hayes, Christine (2015). Introduction to the Bible. Yale University Press. ISBN 978-0-300-18827-1.
- Jones, Gwilym H. (2007). "12. 1 and 2 Samuel". In Barton, John; Muddiman, John (eds.). The Oxford Bible Commentary (first (paperback) ed.). Oxford University Press. pp. 196–232. ISBN 978-0-19-927718-6.
- Klein, R.W. (2003). "Samuel, books of". In Bromiley, Geoffrey W (ed.). The International Standard Bible Encyclopedia. Eerdmans. ISBN 978-0-8028-3784-4.
- Knight, Douglas A (1995). "Chapter 4 Deuteronomy and the Deuteronomists". In James Luther Mays, David L. Petersen and Kent Harold Richards (ed.). Old Testament Interpretation. T&T Clark. ISBN 978-0-567-29289-6.
- Ulrich, Eugene, ed. (2010). The Biblical Qumran Scrolls: Transcriptions and Textual Variants. Brill.
- Würthwein, Ernst (1995). The Text of the Old Testament. Translated by Rhodes, Erroll F. Grand Rapids, MI: Wm. B. Eerdmans. ISBN 0-8028-0788-7.
