= Zuph =

Biblical name

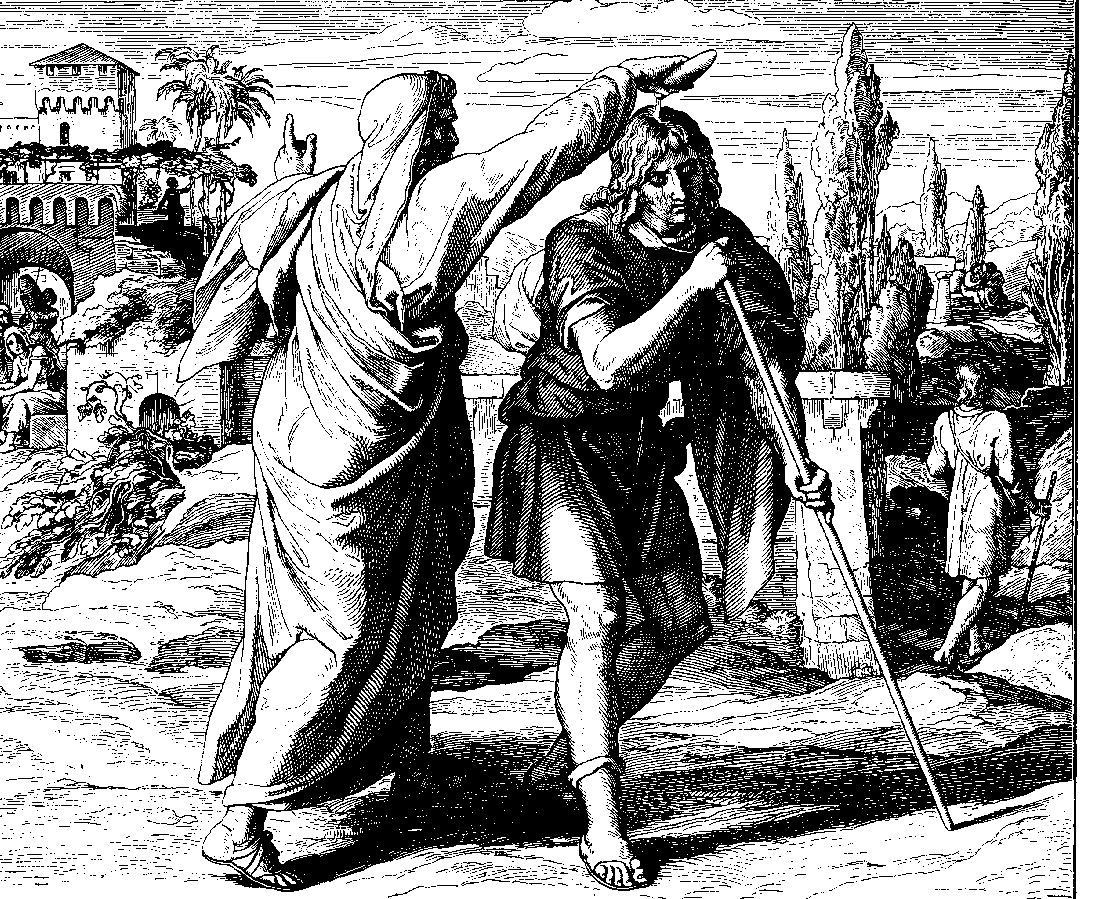
Samuel anointed Saul in an unnamed town in the land of Zuph, woodcut from Die Bibel in Bildern

Zuph means honeycomb in Hebrew

- According to the Books of Chronicles, a Kohathite Levite, a fact not mentioned in the books of Samuel. He was the ancestor of Elkanah and Samuel (1 Samuel 1:1); called also Zophai in the parallel passage, 1 Chronicles 6:26 (or 1 Chronicles 6:11 in Hebrew Bible).
- Land of Zuph (1 Samuel 9:5, 6), a district in which lay Samuel's city, Ramathaim-Zophim. It was probably so named after Zuph (1 Chronicles 6:26). Zuph and the city of Ramathaim-Zophim are mentioned in the Bible together with Mount Ephraim, suggesting that they shared a similar locality.
