= Arimathea =

Former city of Judea

Arimathea or Arimathaea (Koine Greek: Ἀριμαθέα) or Harimathaea or Harimathea (Ἁριμαθαία, Harimathaía) is a place described in the canonical gospels as a city of Judea. It was the reported home of Joseph of Arimathea, who appears in all four canonical Gospel accounts of the Passion of Jesus for having donated his new tomb outside Jerusalem to receive the body of Jesus (see Matt. 27:57–59; Mark 15:42–45; Luke 23:50–53; John 19:38–40). There is no external evidence for the existence of Arimathea, and some scholars suggest that it may have been a literary device used in the Gospel narrative.

== Identification ==
=== Roman era ===
The Christian apologist and historian Eusebius of Caesarea, in his Onomasticon (144:28–29), identified it with Ramathaim-Zophim and wrote that it was near Diospolis (now Lod). Ramathaim-Zophim was a town in Ephraim, the birthplace of Samuel, where David came to him (1 Samuel 1). He briefly describes it as follows: "Armthem Seipha (Sofim). City of Elcana and Samuel. It is situated (in the region of Thamna) near Diospolis. The home of Joseph who was from Arimathea in the Gospels."

Scholars of the Onomasticon have identified the Greek name Arimathea as deriving from the Hebrew place name of Ramathaim-Zophim (Biblical Hebrew: רמתיים-צופים, romanized: Ramaṯayim-ṣop̄im), which is attested in the Hebrew Bible and 1 Maccabees 11:34. It appeared in the Septuagint as Armathaim Sipha (Αρμαθαιμ Σιφα).

=== Byzantine era ===
The town of Harmathemē (‘Αρμαθεμη) appears on the 6th-century Madaba Map. Casanowicz argues for its identification with Bani Zeid al-Gharbia in the West Bank.

=== Crusader period ===
The Crusaders seem to have identified Ramla with Ramathaim and Arimathea. Ramla was a medieval town founded around 705–715 by the Umayyad Caliphate, and located on land in what had once been the allotment of the Tribe of Dan.
