= Jeroham =

Name list

Jeroham (Hebrew: יְרֹחָם Yərōḥām) is a name which means "cherished" or "one who finds mercy". A number of people with this name are mentioned in the Hebrew Bible:

1. The Father of Elkanah, and grandfather of the prophet Samuel — in 1 Samuel 1:1.
2. The father of Azareel, the "captain" of the tribe of Dan — in 1 Chronicles 27:22.
3. A Benjamite mentioned in 1 Chronicles 12:7 and 1 Chronicles 9:12.
4. The father of Azariah, one of the "commanders of the hundreds" who formed part of Jehoiada's campaign to restore the kingship to Joash in 2 Chronicles 23:1
5. A priest mentioned in 1 Chronicles 9:12; (perhaps the same as in Nehemiah 11:12).

The modern city of Yeruham, Israel bears the Modern Hebrew equivalent of the name.
