= Ramah in Benjamin =

Biblical city of ancient Israel

Coordinates: 31.8500°N 35.2317°E

Ramah (from Hebrew: "height") was, according to the Hebrew Bible, a city in ancient Israel in the land allocated to the tribe of Benjamin. It was located near Gibeon and Mizpah to the West, Gibeah to the South, and Geba to the East.

Ramah has been commonly identified with modern al-Ram, about 8 kilometres (5.0 mi) north of Jerusalem. Na'aman preferred to identify Ramah with the nearby site of Nabi Samwil.

== Biblical accounts ==
The city is first mentioned in Joshua 18:25, near Gibeah of Benjamin. In the Book of Judges, a Levite came traveling to Gibeah, with Ramah just ahead (Judges 19:11–15).

Ramathaim-zophim is the town (1 Samuel 1:9) that was home to Samuel's mother Hannah and his father Elkanah, from which they journeyed to the sanctuary at Shiloh, where Hannah prayed to God to end her barrenness and give her a child (1 Samuel 1:1). Ramah is mentioned in 1 Samuel 8:4 in reference to a meeting place during Samuel's rule.

Ramah was later fortified by Baasha, king of the northern kingdom, in order to control access to Jerusalem (1 Kings 15:17–22; 2 Chronicles 16:1–6). Asa, king of the southern kingdom of Judah, employed Ben-Hadad I, the Syrian king, successfully to attack Baasha at home and draw his forces away from this city (1 Kings 15:18). The biblical account states that the fortifications were later dismantled by decree of King Asa and the materials used to fortify Judah's defenses at nearby Geba and Mizpah (1 Kings 15:22; 2 Chronicles 16:6).

When Jerusalem was destroyed by the Babylonians, those taken captive were assembled in Ramah before being moved to Babylon (Jeremiah 40:1).

Jeremiah said:

A voice is heard in Ramah, mourning and great weeping, Rachel weeping for her children and refusing to be comforted, because they are no more (Jeremiah 31:15 NIV).

Rachel – the ancestress of the three tribes, Ephraim, Manasseh, and Benjamin – had so desired children that she considered herself dead without them (Genesis 30:1). Jeremiah said that she was figuratively weeping because of the loss of the people killed or taken in captivity. And since she was the mother of Benjamin, it would fit because those in Ramah were Benjamites.

In the New Testament, Ramah is mentioned in the Gospel of Matthew (2:18), where it is stated that Jeremiah's prophecy about Rachel received "a second accomplishment" in the slaughter of boy children carried out when Herod was king:

Then what was said through the prophet Jeremiah was fulfilled:
A voice is heard in Ramah, weeping and great mourning, Rachel weeping for her children and refusing to be comforted, because they are no more.

== See also ==
- Ramathaim-zophim
