= Hannah (biblical figure) =

Biblical prophetess, traditional author of the Song of Hannah, mother of Samuel

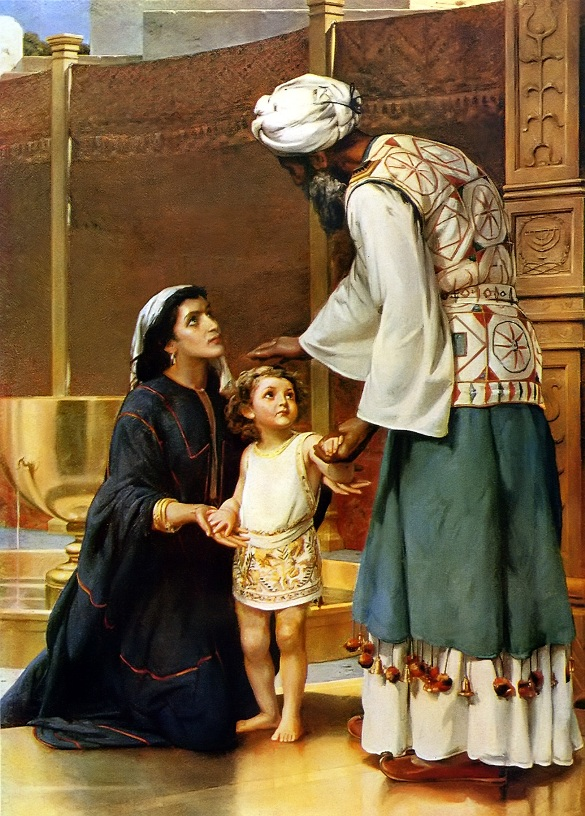
- Samuel Dedicated by Hannah at the Temple by Frank W.W. Topham

Prophetess
- Venerated in: Judaism; Christianity
- Major shrine: Tomb of Samuel, State of Palestine
- Feast: December 9 (Eastern Orthodox Church)
- Attributes: Often depicted as an infertile woman asking God for a child.
- Patronage: Childless wives, infertile women
- Major works: Song of Hannah

Hannah (/ˈhænə/; Biblical Hebrew: חַנָּה, romanized: Ḥanṅā, lit. 'favor' or 'grace') is one of the wives of Elkanah mentioned in the First Book of Samuel. According to the Hebrew Bible, she was the mother of Samuel.

== Biblical narrative ==
The narrative about Hannah can be found in 1 Samuel 1:2–2:21. Outside of the first two chapters of 1 Samuel, she is not otherwise mentioned in the Bible.

In the biblical narrative, Hannah is one of two wives of Elkanah. The other, Peninnah, had given birth to Elkanah's children, but Hannah remained childless. Nevertheless, Elkanah preferred Hannah. According to Lillian Klein, the use of this chiasmus underscores the standing of the women: Hannah is the primary wife, yet Peninnah has succeeded in bearing children. Hannah's status as primary wife and her barrenness recall Sarah and Rebecca in Genesis 17 and Genesis 25 respectively. Klein suggests that Elkanah took Peninnah as a second wife because of Hannah's barrenness.

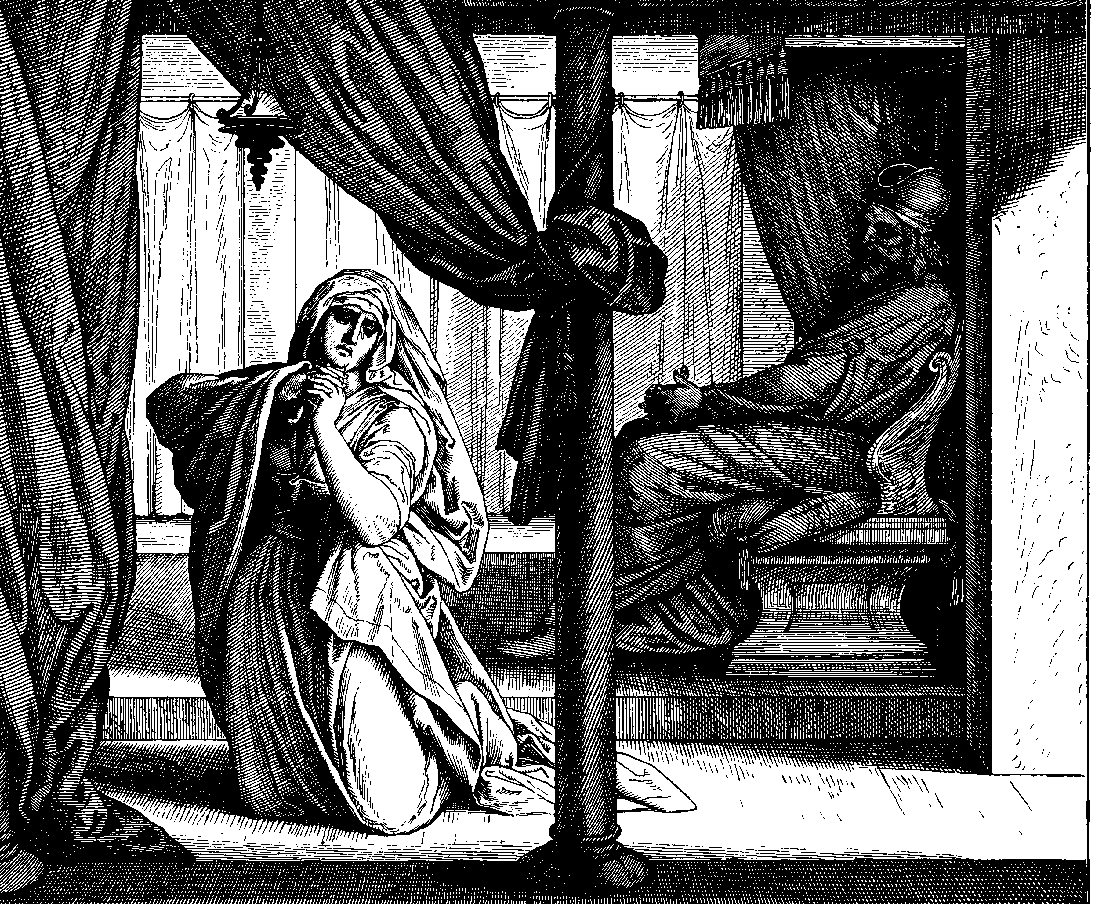
Hannah's prayer, 1860 woodcut by Julius Schnorr von Karolsfeld

Every year, Elkanah would offer a sacrifice at the Shiloh sanctuary, and give Peninnah and her children a portion but he gave Hannah a double portion "because he loved her, and the LORD had closed her womb" (1 Samuel 1:5, NIV). One day Hannah went up to the Tabernacle and prayed with great weeping (I Samuel 1:10), while Eli the High Priest was sitting on a chair near the doorpost. In her prayer, she asked God for a son and in return she vowed to give the son back to God for the service of God. She promised he would remain a Nazarite all the days of his life. According to Lillian Klein, the value of women is demonstrably enhanced by their child-bearing capacities. The narrative takes her pain and places it in her personal failure and then draws it out in a communal context. The desperation of Hannah's vow indicates that merely bearing a male child would establish her in the community.

Eli thought she was drunk and questioned her. When she explained herself, he blessed her and sent her home. Hannah conceived and bore a son, and named him Samuel, literally, Shmuel (Hebrew transliteration) Heard by God, "since she had asked the Lord for him" (1 Samuel 1:20 NAB). She raised him until he was weaned and brought him to the temple along with a sacrifice.

Hannah is also considered to be a prophetess: in her song of thanksgiving (1 Samuel 2:1–10) she is inspired “to discern in her own individual experience the universal laws of the divine economy, and to recognise its significance for the whole course of the Kingdom of God". This song may be compared to the Magnificat, Mary's song of thanksgiving in the New Testament (Luke 1:46–55), but biblical commentator A. F. Kirkpatrick notes that "the Magnificat should be carefully compared with Hannah's song, of which it is an echo rather than an imitation. The resemblance lies in thought and tone more than in actual language, and supplies a most delicate and valuable testimony to the appropriateness of this hymn to Hannah's circumstances".

Eli announced another blessing on Hannah, and she conceived 3 more sons and 2 daughters, making six in total.

== In contemporary biblical criticism ==
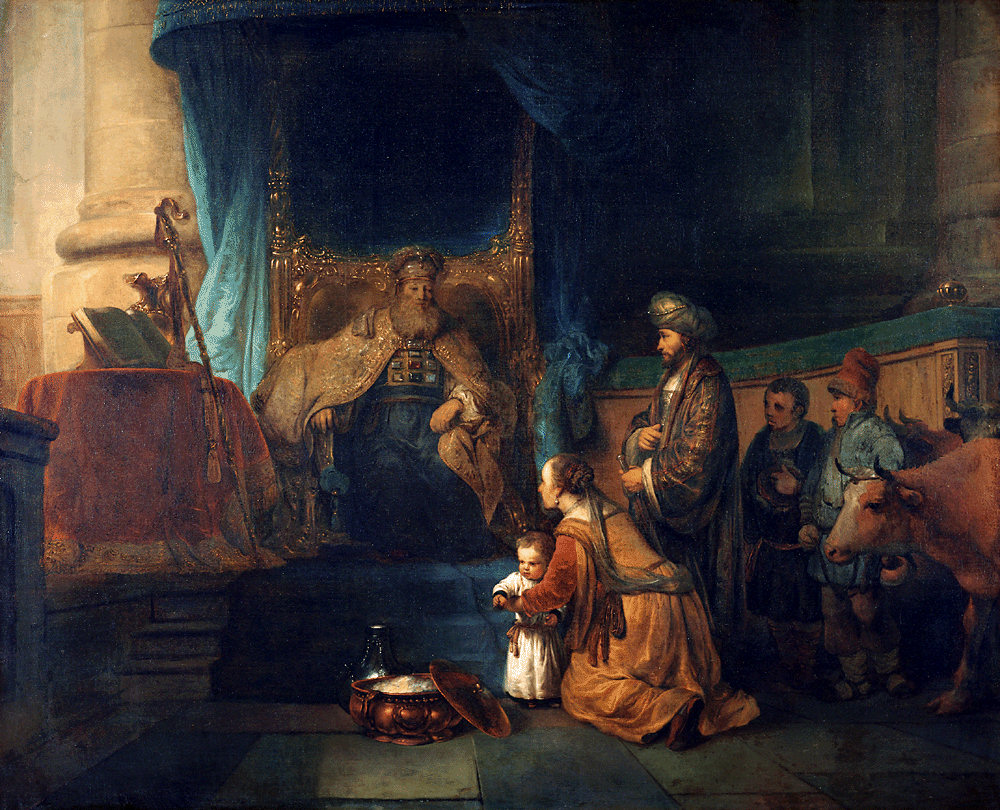
Hannah presenting her son Samuel to the priest Eli, ca. 1665

Hannah's conflict with her rival, her barrenness, and her longing for a son are stereotypical motifs. According to Michelle Osherow, Hannah represents the character of the earnest petitioner and grateful celebrant of divine glory. Hannah was an important figure for early English Protestantism, which emphasized the importance of private prayer. The Jerusalem Talmud took Hannah as an exemplar of prayer. The story of Hannah is the Haftarah reading for Rosh Hashanah.

=== Samuel or Saul ===
The Hebrew form of the name "Saul" is shaul, and the story of Samuel's birth contains repeated uses the related verbal root sh-'-l in various forms, including in the verse in which Hannah explains her son's name (1:20). In verse 28, the form shaul ("lent") itself is found, identical to the Hebrew name of Saul. As a result, it has been suggested by critical commentators the story was originally about the birth of Saul, but that the name "Samuel" was substituted for Saul at a later date. Alternatively, Nadav Na'aman argues that the verbal root sh-'-l is actually related to the name "Shiloh", the place where Samuel was born.

== Vows ==
Numbers 30:11-13 allows a husband to nullify a vow made by his wife, if he registers his objection when he learns of it. However, if he says nothing, the vow is allowed as valid. The next time Elkanah goes to Shiloh, Hannah remains home to care for her child, but tells him that she will present the boy to the Lord when he is weaned. Elkanah responds, "Do what you think best." By the time "the child was weaned"—there is some debate as to what age Samuel was dedicated to the Temple—Hannah serves the soundness of her promise by bringing a viable child to serve in the sanctuary, already educated in the ways of the Lord. The quality of one's sacrifice reflected the quality of one's faith.

In Leviticus, provisions were made for redeeming vows or pledges in money that would go to the support of the priests and the sanctuary. So Hannah could have chosen that option to fulfill her vow, if on calm reflection, once she had her son, she felt unable to part with him.

== In art ==
William Wailes created a stained-glass window depicting Hannah, Samuel and Eli for the Church of St. Mary the Virgin in Ambleside, Great Britain.

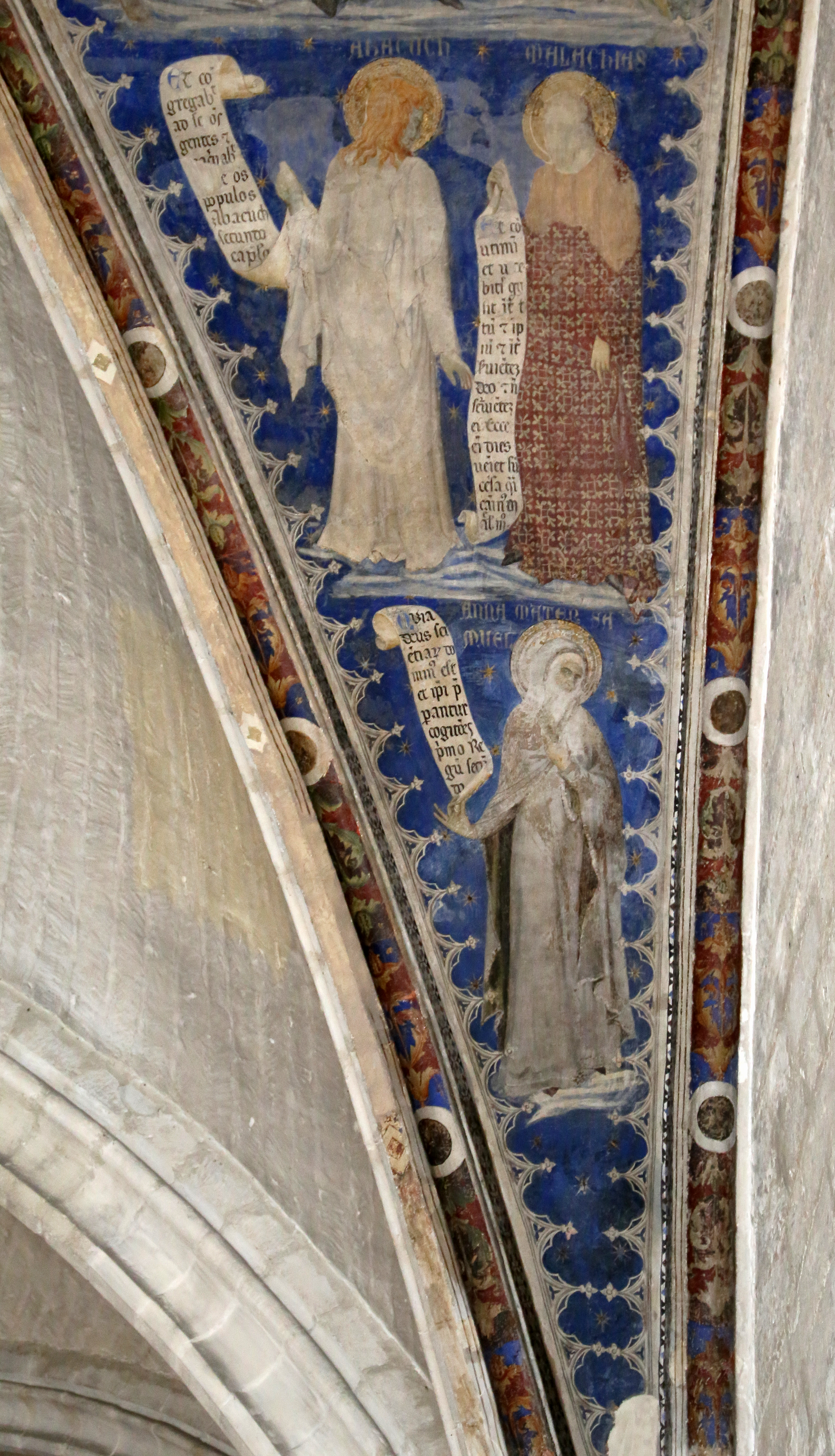
"Anna, mater Samuel" depicted in a fresco of the Biblical prophets by Matteo Giovanetti, 1353.

== In fiction ==
- Smith, Eileen, Jill, "A Passionate Hope: Hannah's Story, Daughters of the Promised Land" (2018)
- Moore, H.B., "Hannah: Mother of a Prophet" (2022)
- Etzioni-Halevy, Eve "The Song of Hannah" (2005)

== See also ==
- Tel Arad
- Midrash Samuel
- Song of Hannah
