= Khirbet el-Qureina =

Archaeological site in the central West Bank

- خربة القرينعة (Arabic)
- Structure built of ashlar stones
- Interactive map of Khirbet el-Qureina
- 31°53′44.3″N 35°06′52.99″E
- Location: Beit Ur al-Fauqa, West Bank

Khirbet el-Kereina or Khirbet el-Qureina (Arabic: خربة القرينعة) is an archaeological site located in the central West Bank, near Beit Ur al Fauqa.

== Geography ==
The site lies on a slope north of Beit Ur al-Fauqa, which is identified the ancient Lower Bethoron.

== Research history ==
The site was documented in the 1870s by the Palestine Exploration Fund (PEF) in its Survey of Western Palestine, which described it as "heaps of stones".

In 1935, the Mandatory Department of Antiquities documented the site. That year it was visited by Dimitri Baramki, who described it as one of three ruins. He mentioned several remains at the site, including a "rock-cut press, an ancient road, cisterns, ruined walls and heaps of masonry", and attached several photographs.

The site was surveyed in 2015 as part of the New Southern Samaria Survey, conducted by Bar-Ilan University and Ariel University in cooperation with the Archaeological Staff Officer of Judea and Samaria and led by Dvir Raviv, Binyamin Har-Even, Evgeny Aharonovich, and Aharon Tavger.

== Archaeology ==
The site is home to a Jewish village. Its remains date from the Second Temple period until the Bar Kokhba Revolt (132–136 CE). A massive wall, two to three meters thick, encloses the site. Remains at its eastern end may have belonged to a gate. At the site center is a large structure built of ashlar stones, which according to the surveyors, may represent a synagogue from the early Roman period.

Five mikva'ot (ritual baths) were documented at the site. Two of them have double adjacent entrances, apparently designed to separate those descending into the bath from those ascending, a design known especially from Jerusalem but also found in northern Judea. The baths may have served Jewish pilgrims on their way to Jerusalem.

== See also ==
- Khirbet Tibnah

== Bibliography ==
=== Sources ===
- Baramki, Dimitri (19 April 1935). File SRF 155 (Report). Mandatory Scientific Record Files. Kh. El-Qureina: Israel Antiquities Authority Archives.
- Conder, Claude Reignier; Kitchener, Herbert Horatio (1883). "Judaea". The Survey of Western Palestine: Memoirs of the Topography, Orography, Hydrography, and Archaeology. Vol. 3. London: Palestine Exploration Fund. p. 117.
- Raviv, Dvir; Har-Even, Benjamin; Aharonovich, Evgeny; Tavger, Aharon (2018). "The New Southern Samaria Survey—Selected Finds and Preliminary Conclusions". Qadmoniot: A Journal for the Antiquities of Eretz-Israel and Bible Lands (in Hebrew). 51 (156). Israel Exploration Society: 115–123.
