= Elkanah =

Husband of Hannah and father of Samuel in the Books of Samuel

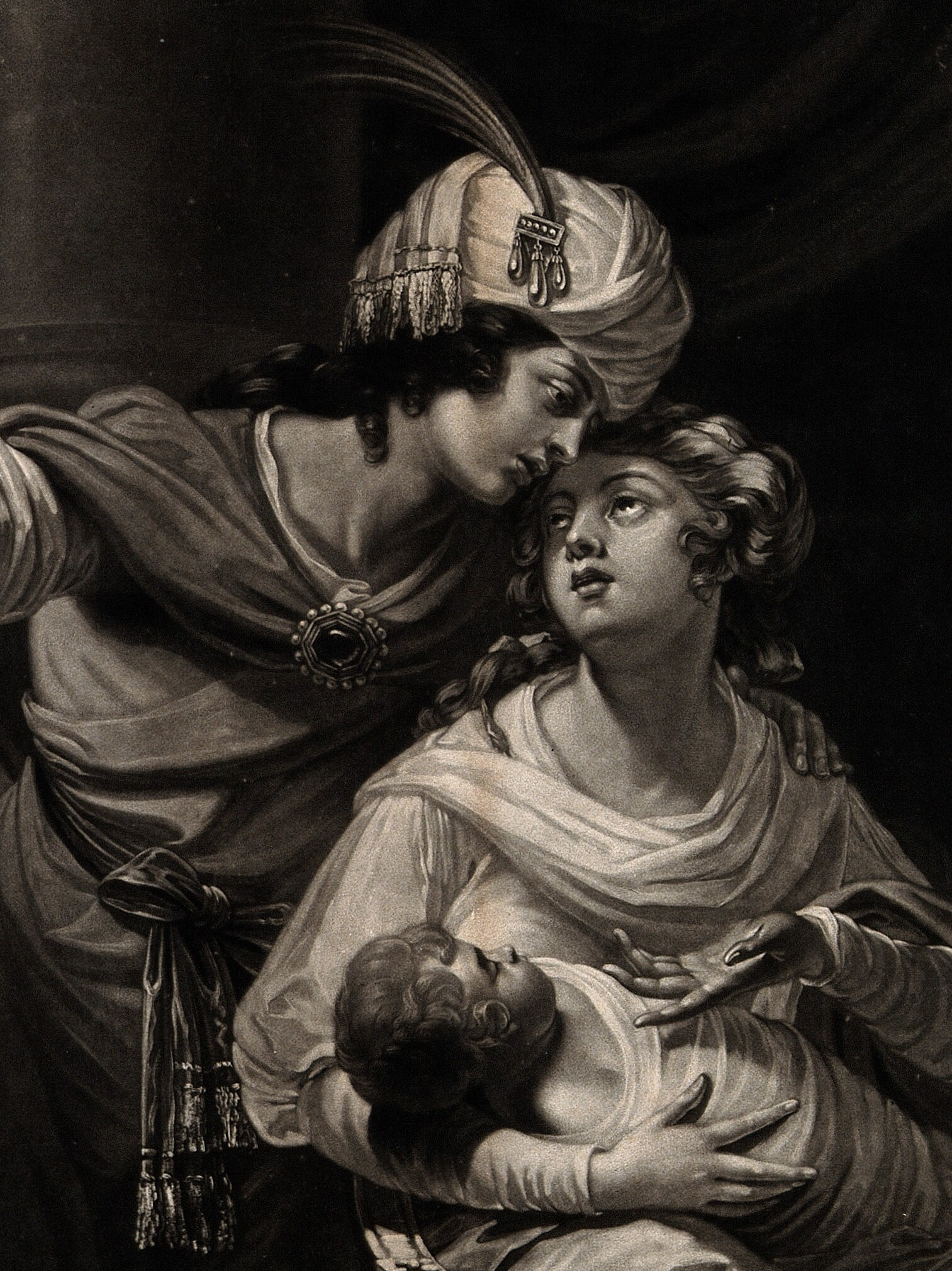
- Detail from Elkanah and Hannah discuss the weaning of Samuel by George Graham, 1815
- Spouses: Hannah; Peninnah
- Children: Samuel

Elkanah (Hebrew: אֱלְקָנָה ’Ĕlqānā "El has purchased") was, according to the First Book of Samuel, the husband of Hannah, and the father of her children including her first, Samuel. Elkanah practiced polygamy; his other wife, less favoured but bearing more children, was named Peninnah. The names of Elkanah's other children apart from Samuel are not given. Elkanah plays only a minor role in the narrative, and is mostly a supporting character to Eli, Hannah, and Samuel.

== Lineage ==
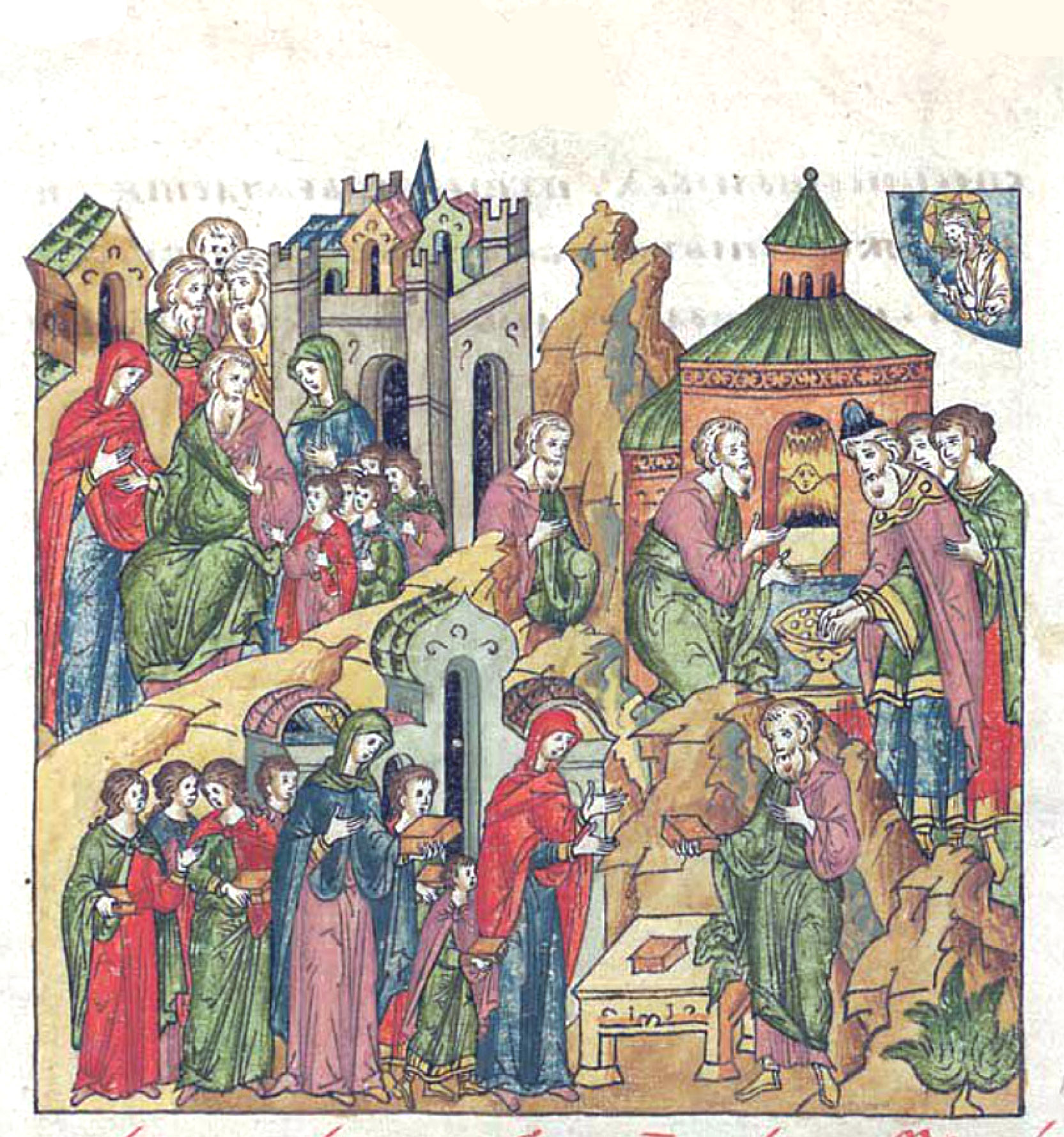
Elkanah with wives at sacrifice; page from the Illustrated Chronicle of Ivan the Terrible, 1560s

According to 1 Samuel 1, Elkanah was the son of Jeroham, who was the son of Elihu, who was the son of Tohu, who was the son of Zuph. He is described as having originated from Zuph, specifically Ramathaim-Zophim, which was part of the tribal lands of Ephraim. While he is called an Ephraimite in 1 Samuel, the Books of Chronicles state that he was a Levite.

Elkanah lived in the mountains of Ephraim (1 Chronicles 6:16-30, 33-37); the Tribe of Levi had no contiguous parcel of land, but were assigned to dwell in certain cities that were scattered throughout the tribes of Israel (Book of Genesis 49:6-7; Book of Numbers 35:6). The fact that Elkanah, a Levite, was denominated an Ephraimite is analogous to the designation of a Levite belonging to Judah (Judges 17:7, for example).

The Books of Samuel variously describe Samuel as having carried out sacrifices at sanctuaries, and having constructed and sanctified altars. According to the Priestly Code/Deuteronomic Code only Aaronic priests/Levites (depending on the underlying tradition) were permitted to perform these actions, and simply being a nazarite or prophet was insufficient. The books of Samuel and Kings offer numerous examples where this rule is not followed by kings and prophets. In the Book of Chronicles, Samuel is described as the son of a Levite, rectifying this situation; however critical scholarship widely sees the Book of Chronicles as an attempt to redact the Book(s) of Samuel and of Kings to conform to later religious sensibilities.

According to rabbinical commentary, Hannah was Elkanah's first wife, and although childless, his favorite. He would attempt to comfort her, "Hannah, why are you weeping? Why are you not eating? Why are you so miserable? Am I not better to you than ten sons?" (1 Samuel 1:8).

Elkanah was a devout man and would take his family annually on pilgrimage to the holy site of Shiloh.

== Talmud ==
The Talmud lists him as a prophet, along with his wife and son.

== See also ==
- Midrash Samuel
