= Ramathaim-Zophim =

Biblical city of ancient Israel

- רמתיים־צופים (Hebrew)
- Ramah, Ramatha
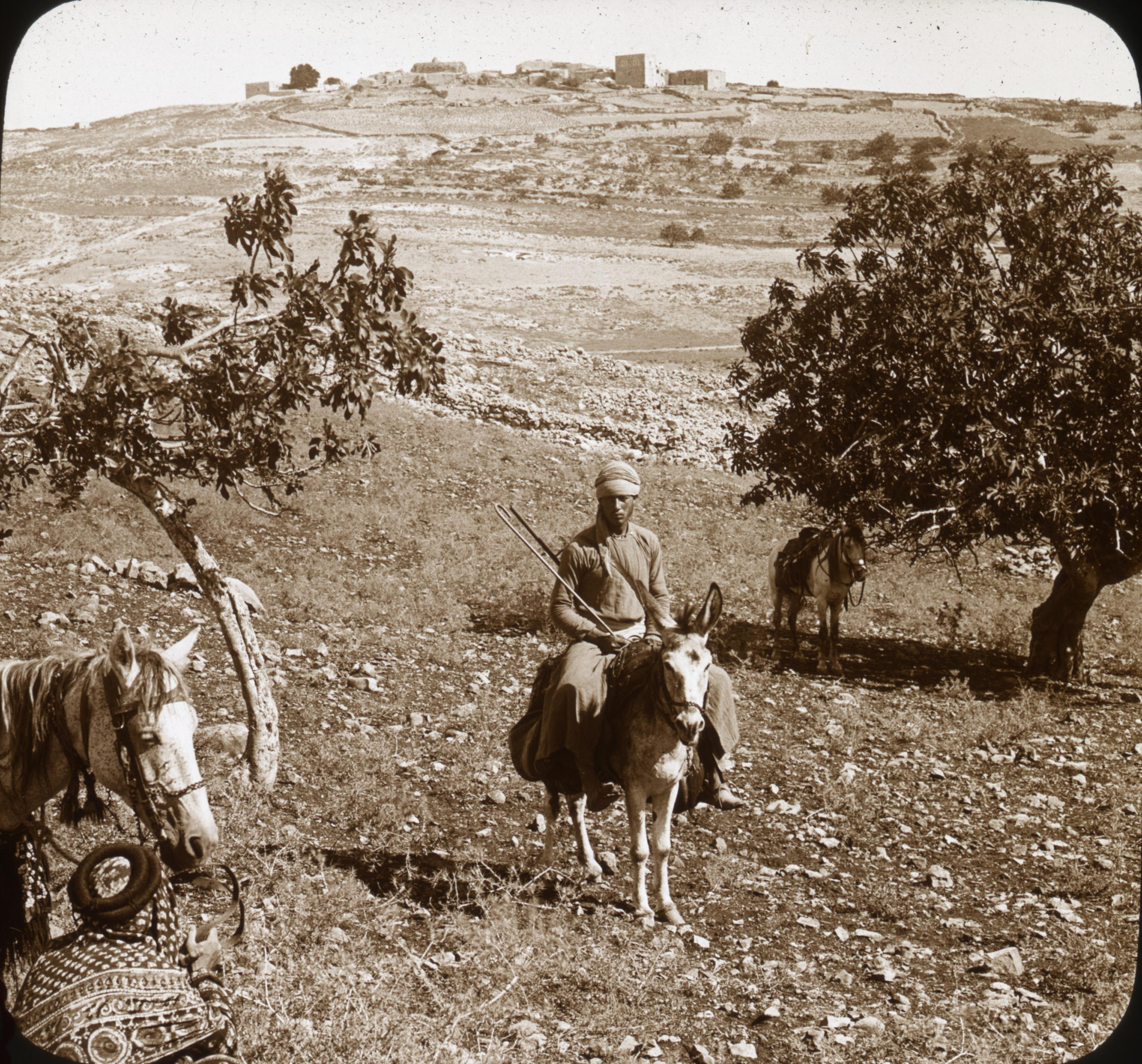
- Ramah viewed from the south, image c. 1915

- Location within Jerusalem District Location within Israel Location within the West Bank
- 31.833°N 35.181°E
- Type: town
- Cultures: Kingdom of Judah
- Region: Southern Levant

Ramathaim-Zophim (Hebrew: רמתיים־צופים), also called Ramah (רָמָה) and Ramatha in the Douay–Rheims Bible translation (Ramathaimsophim in the Vulgate), is a city from the Hebrew Bible, the home town and resting place of prophet Samuel. The name of the town means "the heights of the views."

== Identification ==
Ramah, the home of Elkanah, Samuel's father (1 Samuel 1:19; 2:11), the birthplace of Samuel and the seat of his authority (1 Sam. 2:11; 7:17), the town is frequently mentioned in the history of that prophet and of David (1 Sam. 15:34; 16:13; 19:18-23). Here Samuel died and was buried (1 Sam. 25:1).

The historian Josephus distinguishes between Ramathaim, "a city of the tribe of Ephraim," and Ramah, the burial place of Samuel the prophet, but he does not explicitly say that these were two different places.

Ramathaim-Zophim has been tentatively identified with one of two sites. One of them is the modern Palestinian village of Nabi Samwil, the other the former village, now town, of er-Ram.

=== Er-Ram as Ramah ===
Ramah, according to Eusebius' Onomasticon, was located 6 milestones north of Jerusalem (Ailia), opposite Bethel. Accordingly, Ramah is now thought by many historical geographers to be Er Ram, about 8 km north of Jerusalem.

The Survey of Western Palestine identifies er-Ram with Ramah of Benjamin from Joshua 18:25.

=== Nabi Samwil as Ramah ===
Nabi Samwil stands about 5 miles north-west of Jerusalem, and is held by an originally Christian tradition dating back to the Byzantine period to be the resting place of the prophet Samuel). The site comprises what is now the Israeli Nebi Samuel National Park, with its most prominent feature being a two-storey Crusader fortress, now used as a mosque and a Jewish Orthodox synagogue.

Benjamin of Tudela visited Nabi Samwil when he travelled the land in 1173, noting that the Crusaders had found the bones of Samuel in a Jewish cemetery in Ramla on the coastal plain and reburied them here, on the hill overlooking the Holy City. C. R. Conder, of the Palestine Exploration Fund, discredits this tradition.

=== Ramallah as Ramathaim-Zophim ===
C. R. Conder of the Palestine Exploration Fund raised the hypothesis that, because of its high elevation and how that it affords a good prospect of the surrounding region, Ramathaim-Zophim may have been Ramallah.

=== Nabi Samwil as Mizpah ===
The traditional tomb site of Samuel the prophet, which became known as Neby Samwil ("the prophet Samuel"), may have been Mizpah in Benjamin, where Samuel was appointed leader of the Israelites (1 Sam. 7:5–6). Such was the view of Edward Robinson who visited the site in 1838, and who vehemently objected to identifying Neby Samwil with the Ramah of Samuel. Conder and Kitchener of the Palestine Exploration Fund described the site in their days as being "a small hamlet of mud hovels."

Judas Machabeus, preparing for war with the Syrians, gathered his men at Mizpah, over against Jerusalem: for in Mizpah was a place of prayer heretofore in Israel.

=== Arimathea ===
Some, e.g. Petrus Comestor (ca. 1100–1179) in his Historia Scholastica, Cap. CLXXX: De sepultura Domini, have identified Ramathaim-Zophim as Arimathea of the New Testament.

=== Khirbet esh-Shuna ===
In 2013, Eitan Klein and Hezki Bezalel proposed identifying Ramathaim-Zophim with Khirbet esh-Shuna, an archaeological site about 1 kilometre (0.62 mi) south of Deir 'Ammar. Their proposal builds on Yoel Elitzur's suggestion that the land of Zuph, and with it Ramathaim-Zophim, lay in the western Bethel hills, partly because nearby Beitillu may preserve the name of Bethel of Ephraim. Klein and Bezalel argued that Khirbet esh-Shuna fits the biblical descriptions. It was a large and important Iron Age settlement on high ground, possibly spanning two adjacent hilltops, in Mount Ephraim and within a day's walk of Gibeah of Saul. They also suggested that the name of the nearby Wadi esh-Shukh may preserve that of Shoco, mentioned in the account of David's flight to Samuel at Ramah (1 Samuel 19:22).
