= Samuel =

Biblical prophet and seer

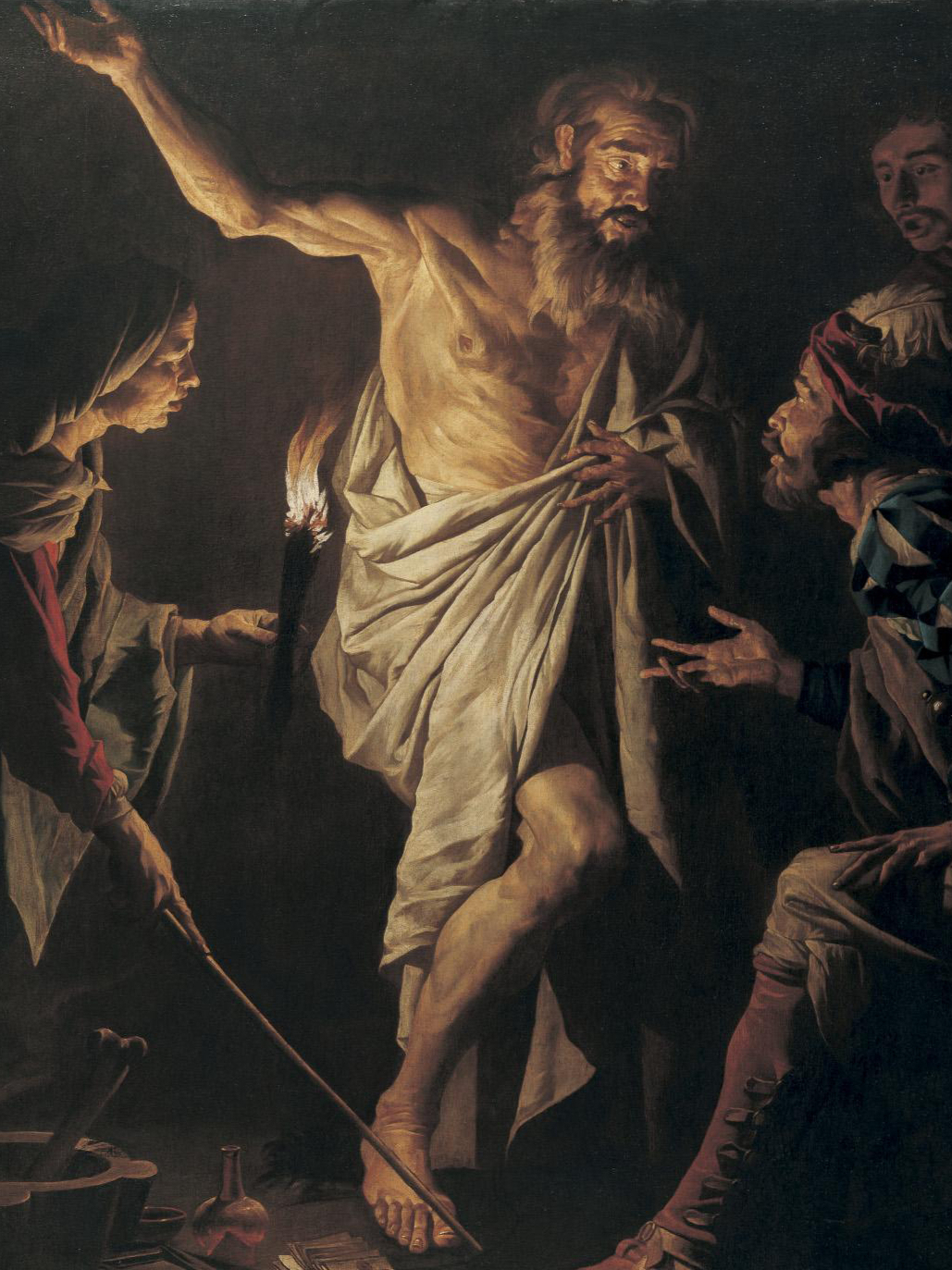
- Detail from Saul and the Witch of Endor by Matthias Stom, c. 1635

Prophet, seer
- Born: c. 1070 BCE; Ramathaim-Zophim (traditional)
- Died: c. 1012 BCE; Ramah in Benjamin (traditional)
- Venerated in: Judaism; Christianity; Islam; Baháʼí Faith; Rastafari
- Feast: August 20 (Catholicism, Eastern Orthodoxy, Lutheranism); July 30 (Armenian Apostolic Church); 9 Paoni (Coptic Orthodox Church)

Samuel (Note: English: /ˈsæmjuəl/ SAM-yoo-əl; Hebrew: שְׁמוּאֵל, Modern: Šəmūʾēl, Tiberian: Šămūʾēl; Arabic: شموئيل, romanized: Šamūʾīl, or صموئيل, Ṣamūʾīl; Greek: Σαμουήλ, romanized: Samouḗl; Latin: Samūēl.) is a figure who, in the narratives of the Hebrew Bible, plays a key role in the transition from the biblical judges to the United Kingdom of Israel under Saul, and again in the monarchy's transition from Saul to David. He is venerated as a prophet in Judaism, Christianity, and Islam. In addition to his role in the Jewish Bible/Old Testament, Samuel is mentioned in Jewish rabbinical literature, in the Christian New Testament, and in the second chapter of the Quran (although the text does not mention him by name). He is also treated in the fifth through seventh books of Antiquities of the Jews, written by the Jewish scholar Josephus in the first century. He is first called "the Seer" in 1 Samuel 9:9.

== Biblical account ==
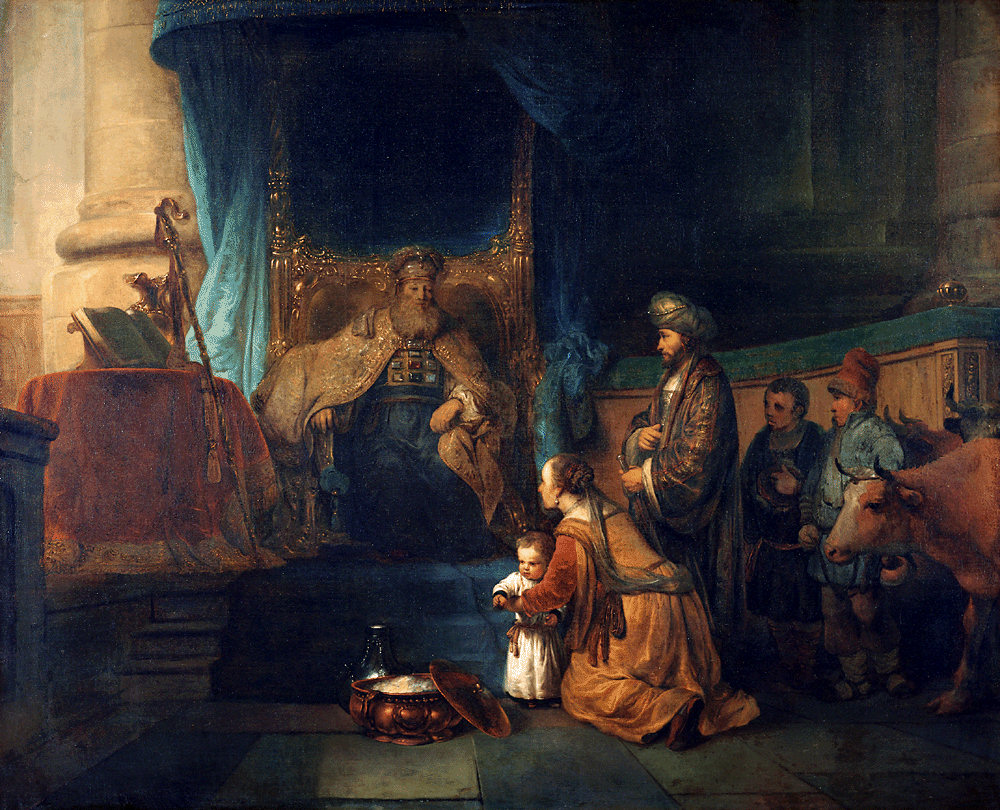
Gerbrand van den Eeckhout – Hannah presenting her son Samuel to the priest Eli c. 1665

=== Family ===
Samuel's mother was Hannah and his father was Elkanah. Elkanah lived at Ramathaim in the district of Zuph. His genealogy is also found in a pedigree of the Kohathites (1 Chronicles 6:3–15) and in that of Heman the Ezrahite, apparently his grandson (1 Chronicles 6:18–33).

According to the genealogical tables in Chronicles, Elkanah was a Levite—a fact not mentioned in the books of Samuel. The fact that Elkanah, a Levite, was denominated an Ephraimite is analogous to the designation of a Levite belonging to Judah (Judges 17:7, for example).

According to 1 Samuel 1:1–28, Elkanah had two wives, Peninnah and Hannah. Peninnah had children; Hannah did not. Nonetheless, Elkanah favored Hannah. Jealous, Peninnah reproached Hannah for her lack of children, causing Hannah much heartache. Elkanah was a devout man and would periodically take his family on pilgrimage to the holy site of Shiloh.

On one occasion, Hannah went to the sanctuary and prayed for a child. In tears, she vowed that if she were granted a child, she would dedicate him to God as a nazirite. Eli, who was sitting at the foot of the doorpost in the sanctuary at Shiloh, saw her apparently mumbling to herself and thought she was drunk, but was soon assured of both her motivation and sobriety. Eli was the priest of Shiloh, and one of the last Israelite Judges before the rule of kings in ancient Israel. He had assumed the leadership after Samson's death. Eli blessed her and she returned home. Subsequently, Hannah became pregnant, later giving birth to Samuel, and praised God for his mercy and faithfulness.

After the child was weaned, she left him in Eli's care, and from time to time she would come to visit her son.

=== Name ===
According to 1 Samuel 1:20, Hannah named Samuel to commemorate her prayer to God for a child. "... [She] called his name Samuel, saying, Because I have asked him of the Lord" (KJV). From its appearance, the name Samuel (Hebrew: שְׁמוּאֵל Šəmūʾēl, Tiberian: Šămūʾēl) appears to be constructed from the Hebrew Śāmū (שָׂמוּ) + ʾĒl, meaning "God has set" or "God has placed". This meaning relating to the idea of God setting/placing a child in the womb, alongside Hannah dedicating Samuel as a Nazirite to God. The Hebrew śāmū is also related to the Akkadian šâmū (𒊮𒈬), which shares the same meaning. From the explanation given in 1 Samuel 1:20, however, it would seem to come from a contraction of the Hebrew שְׁאִלְתִּיו מֵאֵל (Modern: Šəʾīltīv mēʾĒl, Tiberian: Šĭʾīltīw mēʾĒl), meaning "I have asked/borrowed him from God". Further shortened to שָׁאוּל מֵאֵל (Šāʾūl mēʾĒl, "asked/borrowed from God"), then finally contracted to שְׁמוּאֵל (Šəmūʾēl/Šămūʾēl). This meaning also relating to Hannah dedicating Samuel as a Nazirite to God as well.

=== Calling ===
Samuel worked under Eli in the service of the shrine at Shiloh. One night, Samuel heard a voice calling his name. According to the first-century Jewish historian Josephus, Samuel was 12 years old. Samuel initially assumed it was coming from Eli and went to Eli to ask what he wanted. Eli, however, sent Samuel back to sleep. After this happened three times, Eli realised that the voice was the Lord's, and instructed Samuel on how to answer:

If He calls you, then you must say, "Speak, Lord, for Your servant hears".

Once Samuel responded, the Lord told him that the wickedness of the sons of Eli had resulted in their dynasty being condemned to destruction. In the morning, Samuel was hesitant about reporting the message to Eli, but Eli asked him to honestly recount to him what he had been told by the Lord. Upon receiving the communication, Eli merely said that the Lord should do what seems right unto him.

Samuel grew up and "all Israel from Dan to Beersheba" came to know that Samuel was a trustworthy prophet of the Lord. Anglican theologian Donald Spence Jones comments that "the minds of all the people were thus gradually prepared when the right moment came to acknowledge Samuel as a God-sent chieftain".

=== Leader ===
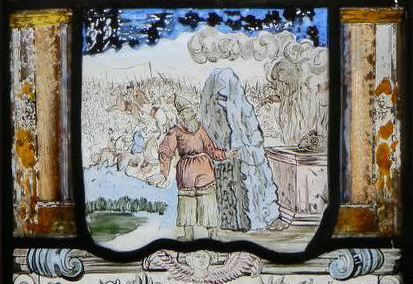
Samuel offers God a sacrifice and erects a large stone at the battle site as the Israelites slaughter the Philistines in the background, as depicted in an 18th-century stained-glass window (Pena Palace, Portugal).

During Samuel's youth at Shiloh, the Philistines inflicted a decisive defeat against the Israelites at Eben-Ezer, placed the land under Philistine control, and took the sanctuary's Ark for themselves. Upon hearing the news of the capture of the Ark of the Covenant, and the death of his sons, Eli collapsed and died. When the Philistines had been in possession of the Ark for seven months and had been visited with calamities and misfortunes, they decided to return the Ark to the Israelites.

According to Bruce C. Birch, Samuel was a key figure in keeping the Israelites' religious heritage and identity alive during Israel's defeat and occupation by the Philistines. "[I]t may have been possible and necessary for Samuel to exercise authority in roles that would normally not converge in a single individual (priest, prophet, judge)."

After 20 years of oppression, Samuel, who had gained national prominence as a prophet (1 Samuel 3:20), summoned the people to the hill of Mizpah, and led them against the Philistines. The Philistines, having marched to Mizpah to attack the newly amassed Israelite army, were soundly defeated and fled in terror. The retreating Philistines were slaughtered by the Israelites. The text then states that Samuel erected a large stone at the battle site as a memorial, and there ensued a long period of peace thereafter.

=== King-Maker ===
Samuel initially appointed his two sons Joel and Abijah as his successors; however, just like Eli's sons, Samuel's proved unworthy for they accepted bribes and perverted judgement. The Israelites rejected them. Because of the external threat from other tribes, such as the Philistines, the tribal leaders decided that there was a need for a more unified, central government, and demanded Samuel appoint a king so that they could be like other nations. Samuel interpreted this as a personal rejection, and at first was reluctant to oblige, until reassured by a divine revelation. He warned the people of the potential negative consequences of such a decision. When Saul and his servant were searching for his father's lost donkeys, the servant suggested consulting the nearby Samuel. Samuel recognized Saul as the future king.

Just before his retirement, Samuel gathered the people to an assembly at Gilgal, and delivered a farewell speech or coronation speech in which he emphasised how prophets and judges were more important than kings, that kings should be held to account, and that the people should not fall into idol worship, or worship of Asherah or of Baal. Samuel promised that God would subject the people to foreign invaders should they disobey. 1 Kings 11:5, 33, and 2 Kings 23:13 note that the Israelites fell into Asherah worship later on.

=== Critic of Saul ===
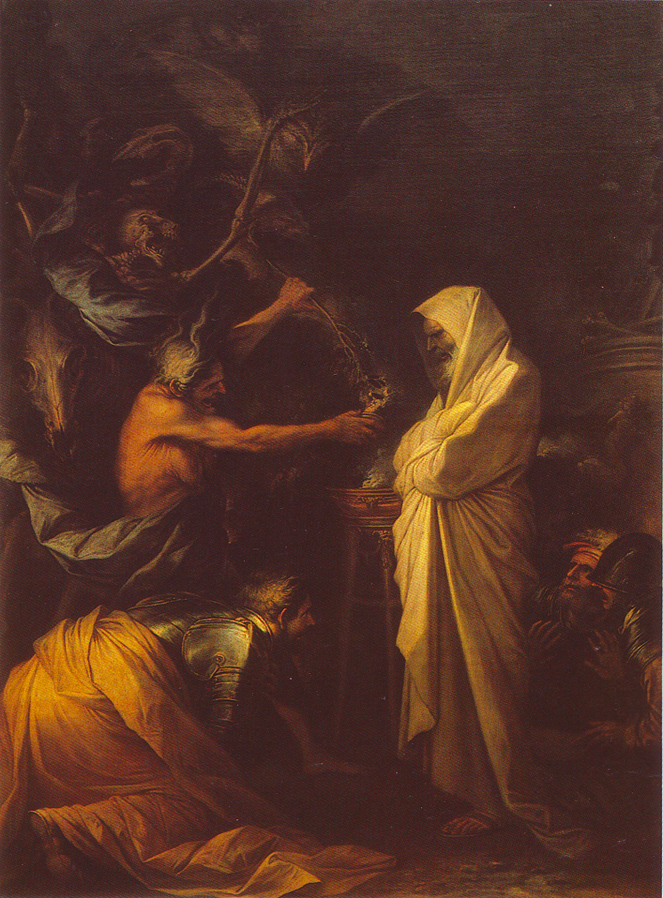
Apparition of the spirit of Samuel to Saul, by Salvator Rosa, 1668

When Saul was preparing to fight the Philistines, Samuel denounced him for proceeding with the pre-battle sacrifice without waiting for the overdue Samuel to arrive. He prophesied that Saul's rule would see no dynastic succession.

Samuel also directed Saul to "utterly destroy" the Amalekites in fulfilment of the commandment in Deuteronomy 25:17–19:

When the Lord your God has given you rest from your enemies all around, in the land which the Lord your God is giving you to possess as an inheritance, ... you will blot out the remembrance of Amalek from under heaven.

During the campaign against the Amalekites, King Saul spared Agag, the king of the Amalekites, and the best of their livestock. Saul told Samuel that he had spared the choicest of the Amalekites' sheep and oxen, intending to sacrifice the livestock to the Lord. This was in violation of the Lord's command, as pronounced by Samuel, to "... utterly destroy all that they have, and spare them not; but slay both man and woman, infant and suckling, ox and sheep, camel and ass" (1 Samuel 15:3, KJV). Samuel confronted Saul for his disobedience and told him that God made him king, and God can unmake him king. Samuel then proceeded to execute Agag. Saul never saw Samuel alive again after this.

Samuel then proceeded to Bethlehem and secretly anointed David as king. He would later provide sanctuary for David, when the jealous Saul first tried to have him killed.

=== Death ===
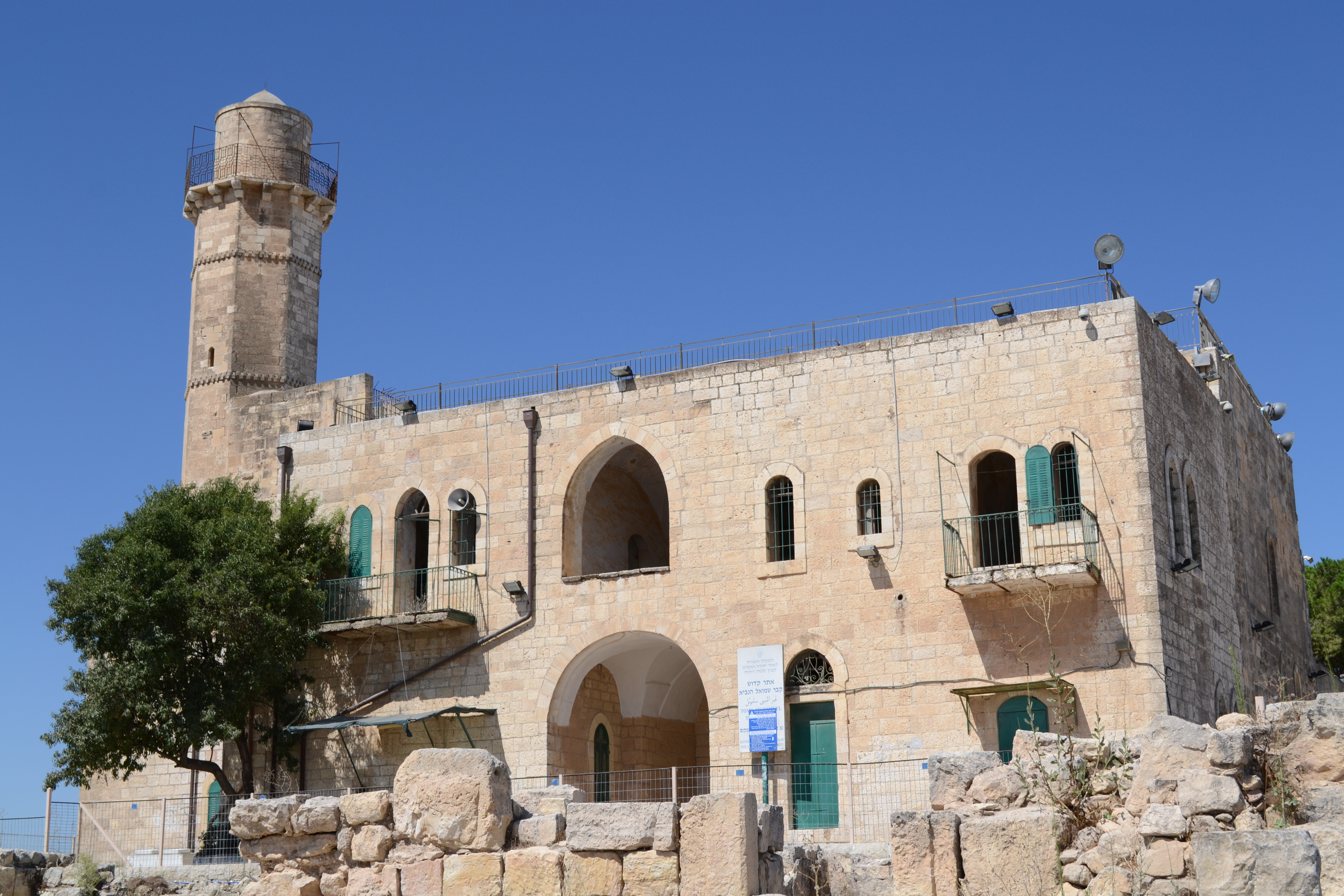
Tomb of Samuel

Samuel is described in the biblical narrative as being buried in Ramah. According to tradition, this burial place has been identified with Samuel's tomb in the West Bank village of Nabi Samwil.

Some time after his death, Saul had the Witch of Endor conjure Samuel's spirit from Sheol in order to predict the result of an upcoming battle (1 Samuel 28:3–24). Samuel was angered by his recalling, and told Saul that the Lord had left him.

=== Rabbinical literature ===
While the Witch of Endor remains anonymous in the Biblical account, the rabbinical Midrash maintains that she was Zephaniah, the mother of Abner (Yalḳ, Sam. 140, from Pirḳe R. El.). That a supernatural appearance is here described is inferred from the repeated emphasis laid on the statement that Samuel had died and had been buried (I Sam. xxv. 1, xxviii. 3), by which the assumption that Samuel was still living when summoned, is discredited (Tosef., Soṭah, xi. 5). Still he was invoked during the first twelve months after his death, when, according to the Rabbis, the spirit still hovers near the body (Shab. 152b). In connection with the incidents of the story the Rabbis have developed the theory that the necromancer sees the spirit but is unable to hear his speech, while the person at whose instance the spirit is called hears the voice but fails to see; bystanders neither hear nor see (Yalḳ., l.c.; Redaḳ and RaLBaG's commentaries). The outcry of the woman at the sight of Samuel was due to his rising in an unusual way—upright, not, as she expected, in a horizontal position (comp. LXX. ὄρθιον in verse 14).

== Documentary hypothesis ==
=== Birth narrative ===
The birth-narrative of the prophet Samuel is found at 1 Samuel 1:1-28. It describes how Samuel's mother Hannah requests a son from Yahweh, and dedicates the child to God at the shrine of Shiloh. The passage appears to make extensive play with the root-elements of Saul's name, and ends with the phrase hu sa'ul le-Yahweh, "he is dedicated to Yahweh." Hannah names the resulting son Samuel, giving as her explanation, "because from God I requested him." Samuel's name, however, can mean "name of God," (or "Heard of God" or "Told of God") and the etymology and multiple references to the root of the name would seem to fit Saul instead. Thus, several scholars argue that the narrative originally described the birth of Saul, and was given to Samuel to enhance the position of David and Samuel at the former king's expense. Alternatively, Nadav Na'aman argues that the verbal root sh-'-l is actually related to the name "Shiloh", the place where Samuel was born.

=== National prophet, local seer ===
Some authors see the biblical Samuel as combining descriptions of two distinct roles:

- A seer, based at Ramah, and seemingly known scarcely beyond the immediate neighbourhood of Ramah (Saul, for example, not having heard of him, with his servant informing him of his existence instead). In this role, Samuel is associated with the bands of musical ecstatic roaming prophets (Nevi'im) at Gibeah, Bethel, and Gilgal, and some traditional scholars have argued that Samuel was the founder of these groups. At Ramah, Samuel secretly anointed Saul, after having met him for the first time, while Saul was looking for his father's lost donkeys, and treated him to a meal.
- A prophet, based at Shiloh, who went throughout the land, from place to place, with unwearied zeal, reproving, rebuking, and exhorting the people to repentance. In this role, Samuel acted as a (biblical) judge, publicly advising the nation, and also giving private advice to individuals. Eventually Samuel delegated this role to his sons, based at Beersheba, but they behaved corruptly and so the people, facing invasion from the Ammonites, persuaded Samuel to appoint a king. Samuel reluctantly did so, and anointed Saul in front of the entire nation, who had gathered to see him.

Source-critical scholarship suggests that these two roles come from different sources, which later were spliced together to form the Book(s) of Samuel. The oldest is considered to be that marking Samuel as the local seer of Ramah, who willingly anointed Saul as king in secret, while the latter presents Samuel as a national figure, begrudgingly anointing Saul as king in front of a national assembly. This later source is generally known as the Republican source, since it denigrates the monarchy (particularly the actions of Saul) and favours religious figures, in contrast to the other main source—the Monarchial source—which treats it favourably. The Monarchial source would have Saul appointed king by public acclamation, due to his military victories, and not by Samuel's cleromancy. Another difference between the sources is that the Republican source treats the ecstatic prophets as somewhat independent from Samuel (1 Samuel 9:1ff) rather than having been led by him.

The passage in which Samuel is described as having exercised the functions of a (biblical) judge, during an annual circuit from Ramah to Bethel to Gilgal (the Gilgal between Ebal and Gerizim) to Mizpah and back to Ramah (1 Samuel 7:15-17), is foreshadowed by Deborah, who used to render judgments from a place beneath a palm between Ramah and Bethel. Source-critical scholarship often considers it to be a redaction aimed at harmonizing the two portrayals of Samuel.

The Book(s) of Samuel variously describe Samuel as having carried out sacrifices at sanctuaries, and having constructed and sanctified altars. According to the Priestly Code/Deuteronomic Code only Aaronic priests/Levites (depending on the underlying tradition) were permitted to perform these actions, and simply being a nazarite or prophet was insufficient. The books of Samuel and Kings offer numerous examples where this rule is not followed by kings and prophets, but some critical scholars look elsewhere seeking a harmonization of the issues. In the Book of Chronicles, Samuel is described as a Levite, rectifying this situation; however critical scholarship widely sees the Book of Chronicles as an attempt to redact the Book(s) of Samuel and of Kings to conform to later religious sensibilities. Since many of the Biblical law codes themselves are thought to postdate the Book(s) of Samuel (according to the Documentary Hypothesis), this would suggest Chronicles is making its claim based on religious motivations. According to most modern scholarship, the Levitical genealogy of 1 Chronicles 4 is not historical.

=== Deuteronomistic Samuel ===
According to the documentary hypothesis of Biblical source criticism, which postulates that "Deuteronomistic historians" redacted the Former Prophets (Joshua, Judges, 1 and 2 Samuel, and 1 and 2 Kings), the Deuteronomists idealized Samuel as a figure larger than life, like Joshua. For example, Samuel's father Elkanah is described as having originated from Zuph, specifically Ramathaim-Zophim, which was part of the tribal lands of Ephraim, while 1 Chronicles states that he was a Levite. Samuel is portrayed as a judge who leads the military, as the judges in the Book of Judges, and also who exercises judicial functions. In 1 Sam 12:6–17, a speech of Samuel that portrays him as the judge sent by God to save Israel may have been composed by the Deuteronomists. In 1 Samuel 9:6–20, Samuel is seen as a local "seer". According to documentary scholarship, the Deuteronomistic historians preserved this view of Samuel while contributing him as "the first of prophets to articulate the failure of Israel to live up to its covenant with God." For the Deuteronomistic historians, Samuel would have been an extension of Moses and continuing Moses' function as a prophet, judge, and priest, which makes the nature of the historical Samuel uncertain.

== Perspectives on Samuel ==
=== Judaism ===
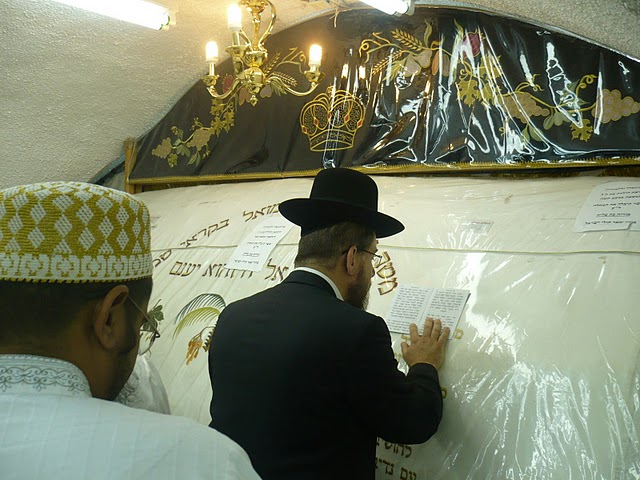
Tomb of Samuel

According to the Book of Jeremiah and one of the Psalms, Samuel had a high devotion to God. Classical Rabbinical literature adds that he was more than an equal to Moses, God speaking directly to Samuel, rather than Samuel having to attend the tabernacle to hear God. Samuel is also described by the Rabbis as having been extremely intelligent; he argued that it was legitimate for laymen to slaughter sacrifices, since the Halakha only insisted that the priests bring the blood, Eli, who was viewed negatively by many Classical Rabbis, is said to have reacted to this logic of Samuel by arguing that it was technically true, but Samuel should be put to death for making legal statements while Eli (his mentor) was present.

Samuel is also treated by the Classical Rabbis as a much more sympathetic character than he appears at face value in the Bible; his annual circuit is explained as being due to his wish to spare people the task of having to journey to him; Samuel is said to have been very rich, taking his entire household with him on the circuit so that he didn't need to impose himself on anyone's hospitality; when Saul fell out of God's favour, Samuel is described as having grieved copiously and having prematurely aged.

His yahrzeit is observed on the 28th day of Iyar.

=== Christianity ===
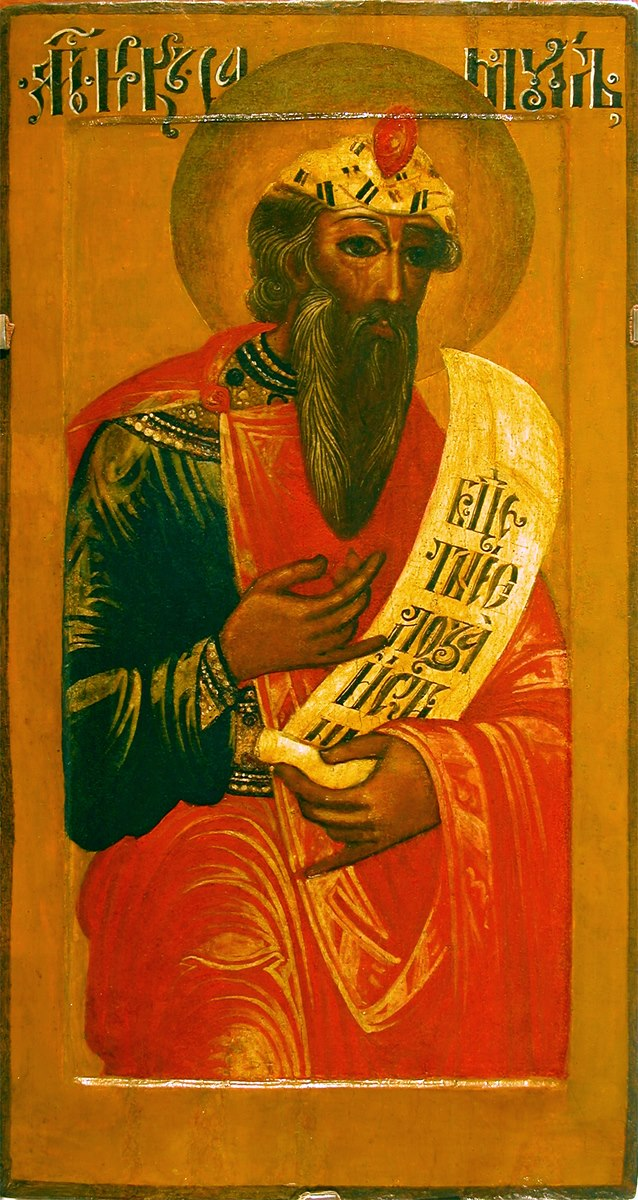
17th-century icon of Samuel (Donetsk Regional Art Museum)

For Christians, Samuel is considered to be a prophet, judge, and wise leader of Israel, and treated as an example of fulfilled commitments to God. On the Catholic, Eastern Orthodox, and Lutheran calendars, his feast day is August 20. He is commemorated as one of the Holy Forefathers in the Calendar of Saints of the Armenian Apostolic Church on July 30. In the Coptic Orthodox Church, the commemoration of the departure of Samuel the Prophet is celebrated on 9 Paoni.

Herbert Lockyer, minister and author, and others have seen in Samuel's combined offices of prophet, priest, and ruler a foreshadowing of Christ.

=== Islam ===
Prophet Ṣamūʾīl Alayhi as-Salam
- صموئيل; Samuel
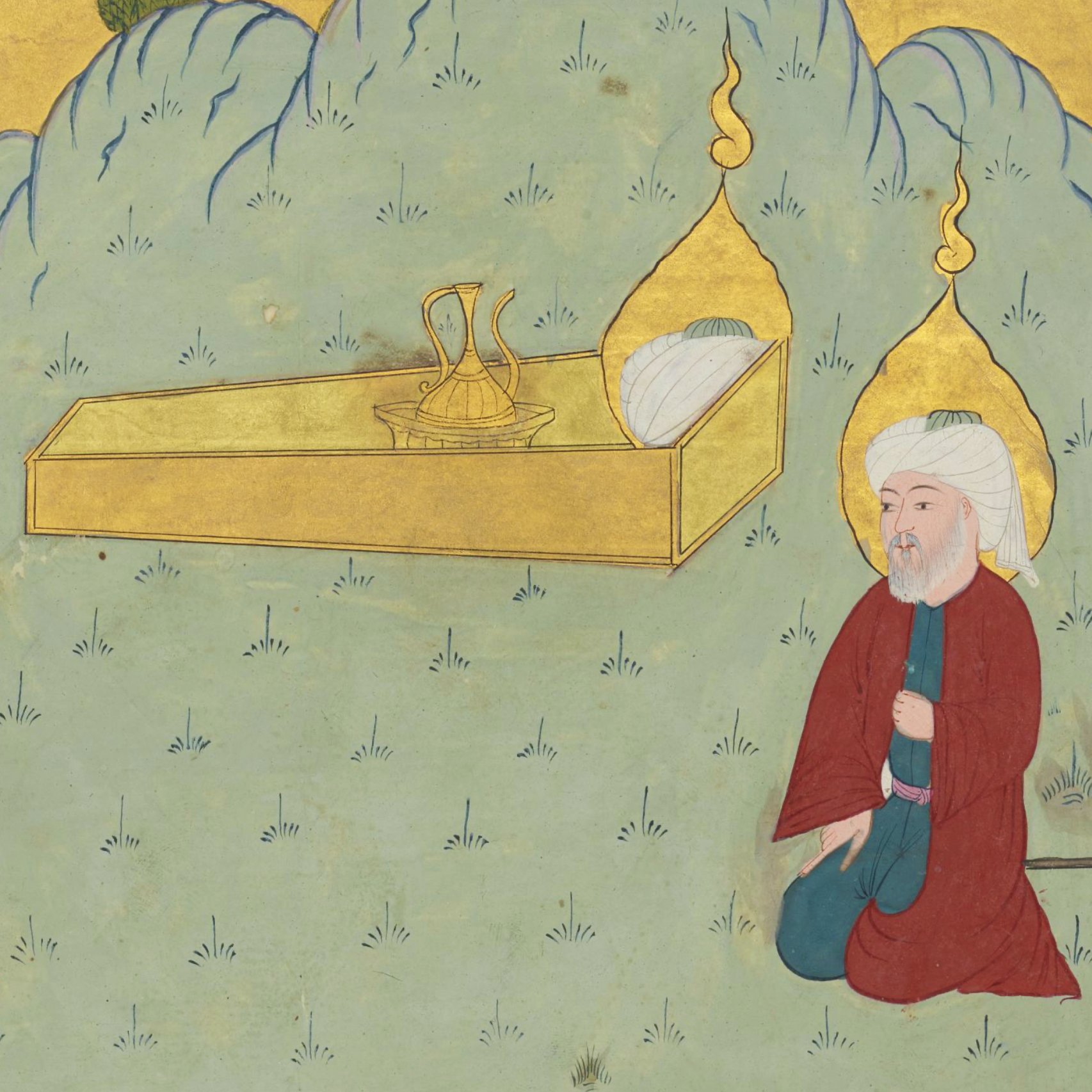
- Samuil kneels next to the chest given by God, which is the Ark of the Covenant and the coffin of fellow prophet Musa

Prophet of Islam
- Preceded by: Yūšaʿ
- Succeeded by: Dāwūd

Religious life
- Religion: Islam

Samuel (Arabic: صموئيل or شموئيل, romanized: Šamūʾīl or Ṣamūʾīl) is seen as a prophet and seer in the Islamic faith. The narrative of Samuel in Islam focuses specifically on his birth and the anointing of Talut. Other elements from his narrative are in accordance with the narratives of other Prophets of Israel, as exegesis recounts Samuel's preaching against idolatry. He is not mentioned by name in the Qur'an, but may be alluded to in Surah Al-Baqara 2:246.

In the Islamic narrative, the Israelites after Moses wanted a king to rule over their country. Thus, God sent a prophet, Samuel, to anoint Talut as the first king for the Israelites. However, the Israelites mocked and reviled the newly appointed king, as he was not wealthy from birth (Q2:247). But, assuming Talut to be Saul, in sharp contrast to the Hebrew Bible, the Qur'an praises Saul greatly, and mentions that he was gifted with great spiritual and physical strength. In the Qur'anic account, Samuel prophesies that the sign of Talut's kingship will be that the Ark of the Covenant will come back to the Israelites.

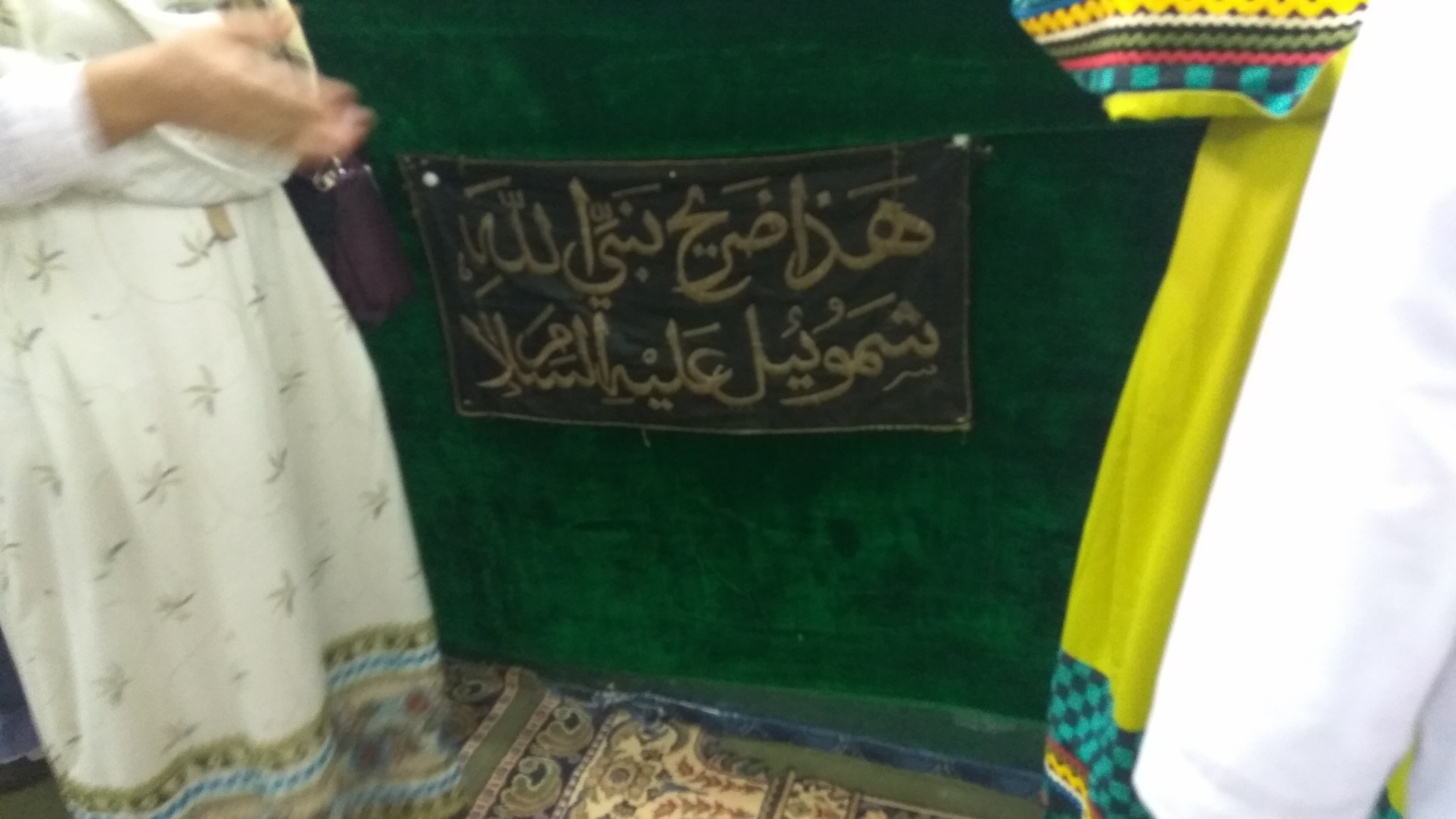
An Arabic sign denoting where Samuel was buried in the Tomb of Samuel, according to tradition

=== Bahá'í ===
`Abdu'l-Bahá, a central figure in the Bahá'í Faith, mentions Samuel as an example of a genuine Prophet of the House of Israel, alongside Ezekiel.

== Portrayals ==
Actors who have portrayed Samuel include Denis Quilley in the 1985 film King David, Leonard Nimoy in the 1997 television film David, Eamonn Walker in the 2009 television series Kings, Mohammad Bakri in the 2016 television series Of Kings and Prophets, and Stephen Lang in the 2025 television series House of David.

== See also ==
- Biblical judges
- Books of Samuel
- List of names referring to El
- Midrash Samuel

== Explanatory notes ==
Samuel Tribe of Levi
Preceded by Eli	Judge of Israel	Saul as king of Israel
