= Mount Ephraim =

Historical name for the central mountainous district of Israel

Mount Ephraim (Hebrew: הר אפרים), or alternatively Mount of Ephraim, was the historical name for the central mountainous district of Israel once allotted to the Tribe of Ephraim (Joshua 17:15; 19:50; 20:7), extending from Bethel to the plain of Jezreel. In Joshua's time (Joshua 17:18), approximately sometime between the 18th century BCE and the 13th century BCE, these hills were densely wooded. They were intersected by well-watered, fertile valleys, referred to in Jeremiah 50:19.

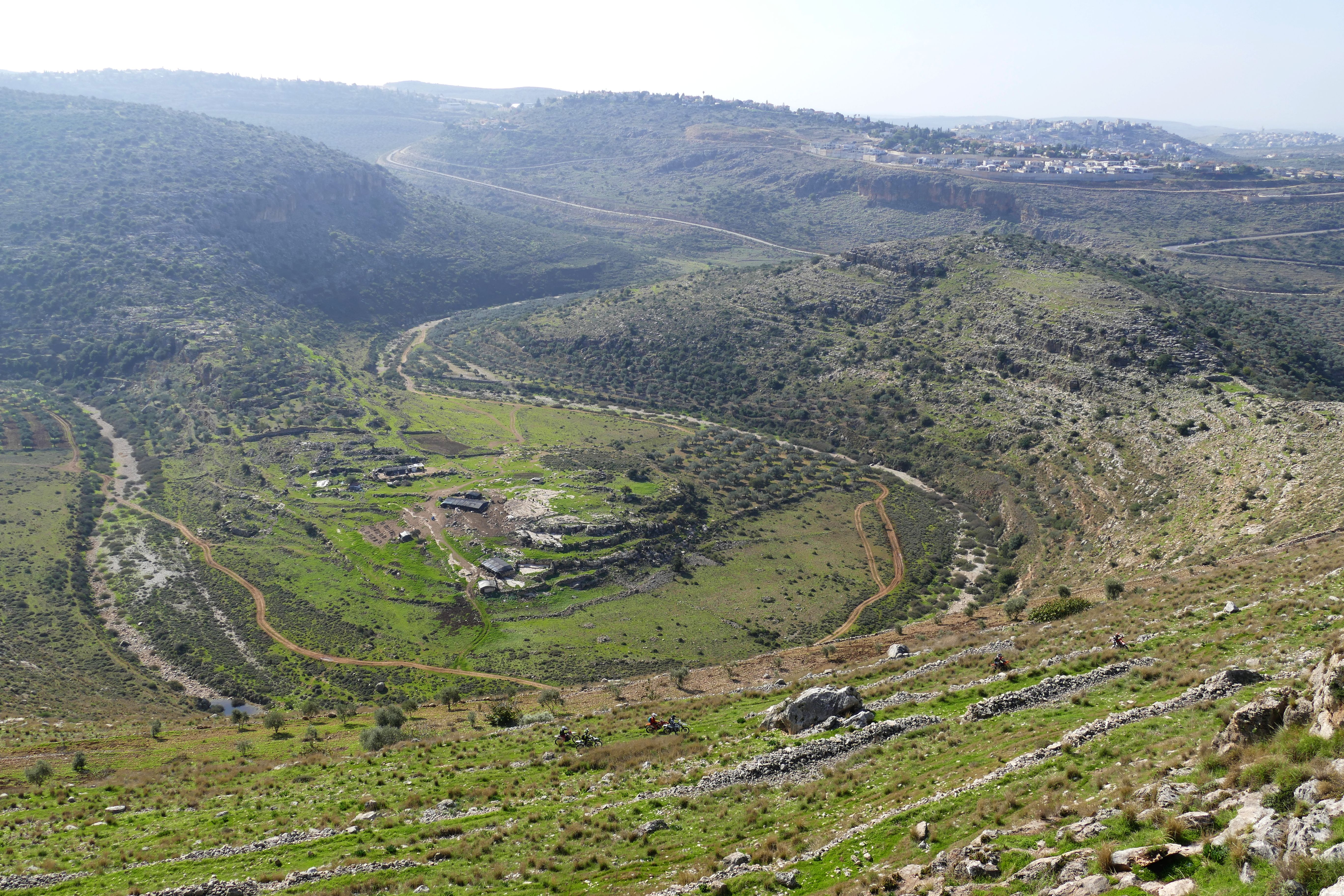
Khirbet Banat Bar, sometimes identified with the town of Zeredah in Ephraim, birthplace of Jeroboam

Later, the region became known as Samaria, after the capital city of the northern Kingdom of Israel which was centered in the area.

== Notable persons ==
Joshua was buried at Timnath-heres among the mountains of Ephraim, on the north side of the hill of Gaash (Judges 2:9). This region is also called the "mountains of Israel" (Joshua 11:21) and the "mountains of Samaria" (Jeremiah 31:5, 6: Amos 3:9).

Israel's fourth judge and prophetess Deborah lived in this region. Her home was called "the palm tree of Deborah", and was between Bethel and Ramah in Benjamin (Judges 4:5).

'Then Jeroboam built Shechem in mount Ephraim, and dwelt therein; and went out from thence, and built Penuel. And Jeroboam said in his heart, Now shall the kingdom return to the house of David:(Ephraim was the new king after the pass of the King of Solomon.)

== See also ==
- Jeremiah 4
