= Battle of Nebi Samwil =

- Part of the Middle Eastern theatre of World War I
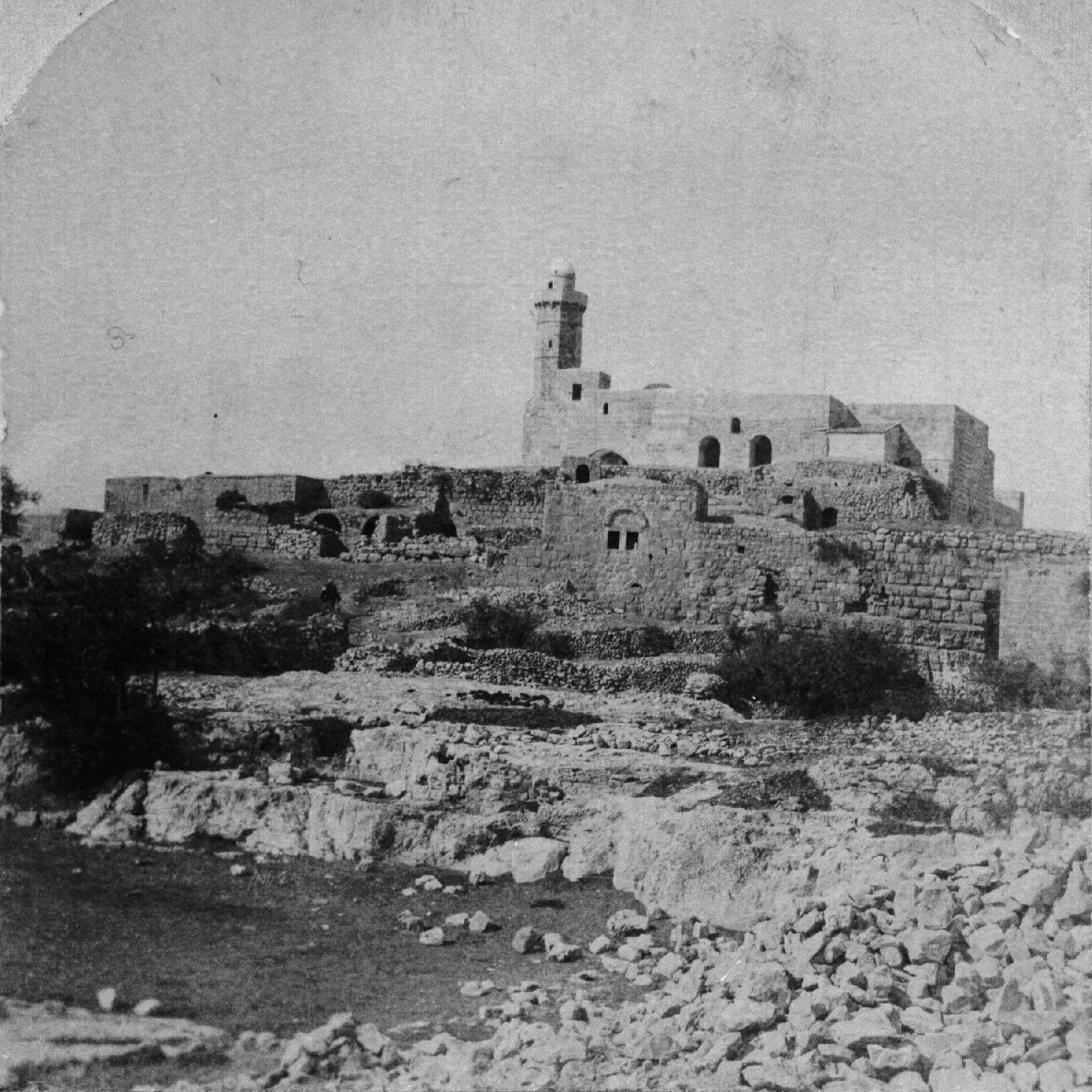
- Nabi Samwil
Date	18–24 November 1917
Location	Nebi Samwil, southern Palestine
Result	British Empire victory

Belligerents
(United Kingdom) British Empire	Ottoman Empire; German Empire; Austria-Hungary

Units involved
XXI Corps	Seventh Army

The Battle of Nebi Samwil (17–24 November 1917) was fought during the decisive British Empire victory at the Battle of Jerusalem between the forces of the Egyptian Expeditionary Force and the Ottoman Empire's Yildirim Army Group during the Sinai and Palestine Campaign, in the First World War. The Battle of Jerusalem began two days after the end of the decisive EEF victory at the Battle of Mughar Ridge which occurred after the EEF defeated the Ottoman Army at the decisive victory at the Battle of Beersheba and Third Battle of Gaza.

The battle was the first attempt by the forces of the British Empire to capture Jerusalem. The village of Nebi Samwil (now spelled Nabi Samwil), also known as the "Tomb of Samuel", was part of the Ottoman defences in front of Jerusalem and its capture was considered vital to the eventual capture of the city. The British attacking force consisted of three divisions, two infantry and one mounted.

The village was captured by the 234th Brigade, part of the 75th Division, on 21 November 1917. However they still had to defend it against Ottoman counter-attacks almost every day. Unsupported by their heavy weapons the British infantry could not break through the main Ottoman defensive line and the attack failed to reach its objective Jerusalem.

== Background ==
In November 1917, the British Empire's Egyptian Expeditionary Force, commanded by General Edmund Allenby had defeated the forces of the Ottoman Empire in the Third Battle of Gaza and the Battle of Mughar Ridge. Pursuing the withdrawing Ottoman army the 75th Division captured Junction Station on 14 November. The capture of the station cut the railway line from Jerusalem and the rest of the country and provided the British forces with a fresh water source. It also split the Ottoman Seventh and Eighth Army. The following day the ANZAC Mounted Division captured Ramleh and Ludd, 5 miles (8.0 km) north of the station and on the Mediterranean coast, then on 16 November the New Zealand Mounted Rifles Brigade captured the port of Jaffa. In the ten days since the Battle of Gaza the British had advanced some 60 miles (97 km), but at the cost of 6,000 casualties. The numbers of the Ottoman forces killed is not known but 10,000 men had been captured by the British along with eighty pieces of artillery and 100 machine guns. Despite these losses the majority of the Ottoman armies had managed to withdraw relativity in one piece, but they had been split with no way for one to support the other if or when they were attacked. Further the Ottoman Seventh Army on the British right was cut off from the Palestinian rail network and all their supplies would have to be brought in by road.

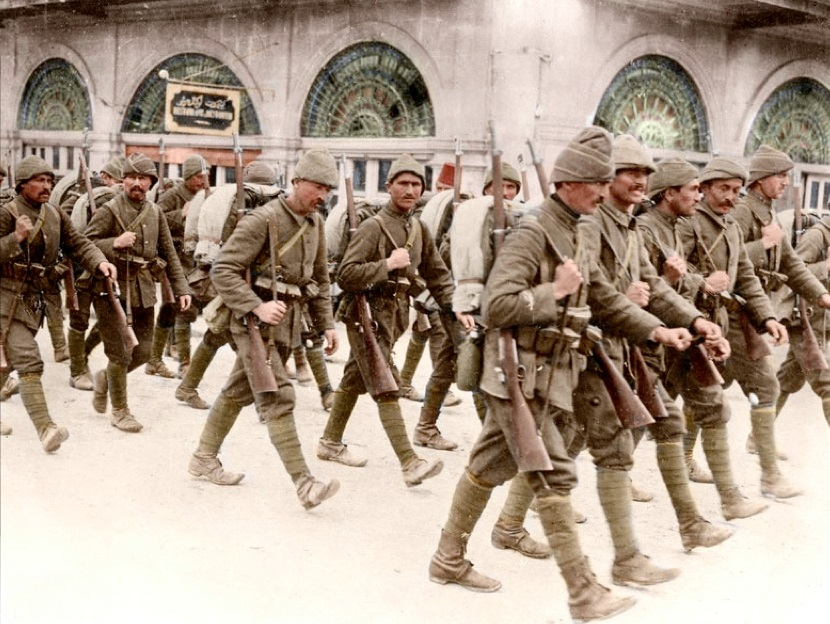
Ottoman infantry

In preparation for the attack, against Jerusalem, the ANZAC Mounted Division and the 54th (East Anglian) Division, would form a defensive line on the coastal plain, while the XXI Corps moved into the Judaean Mountains. Instead of a direct assault on Jerusalem, Allenby planned to first cut off the city from their supply routes in the north. The plan was for two infantry division, the 75th Division on the left, the 52nd (Lowland) Division in the centre, with the horsemen from the Yeomanry Mounted Division on the right, to move on Jerusalem with the 75th using the main Jaffa–Jerusalem road. The two outer division's would circle around Jerusalem meeting at Bireh 10 miles (16 km) to the north of the city.

In the way of the 75th Division was the village of Nebi Samwil also known as the "Tomb of Samuel", the traditional burial site for the biblical prophet Samuel. Nebi Samwil rests at the top of a hill 2,979 feet (908 m) above sea level, 3.1 miles (5.0 km) to the north of Jerusalem. From the village observers can see into Jerusalem and it controls the road from the coast to the west and the road from Samaria to the north into the city. The village was part of the Ottoman defences in front of Jerusalem and its capture was considered vital, to the eventual capture of the city.

== Attack ==
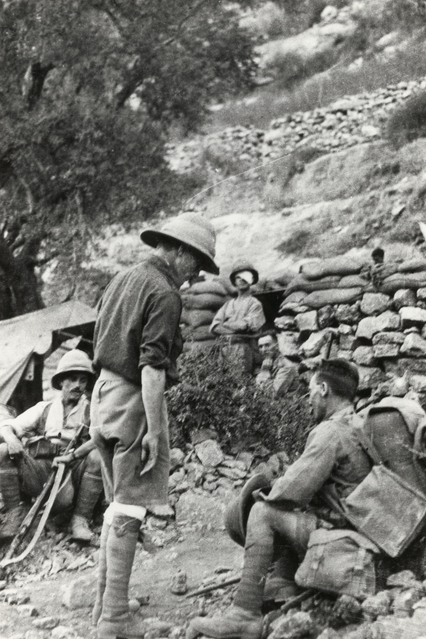
Wounded from the 4th Battalion, Wiltshire Regiment, 75th Division

The attack began on 18 November, with the Australian Mounted Division clearing Latron, which was in the way of the 75th Division. The next day the Yeomanry Mounted Division with the furthest to go moved off first. Followed by the 52nd (Lowland) Division which departed from Ludd and the 75th Division from Latron. The two other divisions travelling astride nothing more than tracks, found it more difficult and their vehicles and heavy weapons had to turn back. The advance also coincided with the start of the winter rains, which not only affected the terrain, but also caused problems for the troops, who were only equipped for a desert war and lacked any winter clothing. However, the 52nd Division did reach Beit Likia and the Yeomanry Division Beit Ur el Tahta by the end of the first day. The 75th, advancing along the only real road in the area, made good progress, fighting through the Ottoman hilltop defences, secured the villages of Saris and Kuryet el Enab on 20 November. The first village in the afternoon, the second before nightfall, in an infantry assault under cover of a thick belt of fog, which obscured the defenders vision. They had however only come up against rearguard positions and still had to face the main Ottoman force.

Elsewhere the 52nd Division were making some progress but the yeomanry were confronted by a strong position of 3,000 infantry supported by artillery on the Zeitun ridge west of Bireh. During a back and forwards battle the yeomanry did at one stage capture the position, but were forced back again on 21 November.

On the same day, the 75th Division changed the direction of the attack north-east towards Biteh, to meet up with the mounted division. The division was stopped at Biddu, and the heights of Nebi Samwil. Fighting through the day, the village was eventually taken by the 234th Brigade that evening. However the two infantry divisions were now bogged down and no further progress could be made.

The British attack continued on the next day, 22 November, against El Jib. However both infantry divisions were now in need of reinforcements, and unsupported by artillery, which could not get up the mountain tracks. Fighting for three days, but unable to break through the main Ottoman defensive position, the attack stalled. For the next two weeks, the Ottoman army tried to retake Nebi Samwil. The British captured 750 prisoners during the period. The heavy casualties they sustained during the attempt seriously affected their ability to stop the next British attempt to take Jerusalem.

Considering the heavy casualties which had been sustained by his command, General Bulfin requested that XX Corps take over the line and by 28 November the relief of the various of XXI Corps positions was completed. In obtaining a footing on some of the most difficult hills on the Judean heights, the efforts of the 52nd and 75th divisions enabled General Allenby to initiate a new plan to capture Jerusalem so they share the honour with the 53rd, 60th (who were already attached to the XX Corps at Latrun) and 75th Divisions, as well the Yeoman Mounted division, which were present at the finish.

== Aftermath ==
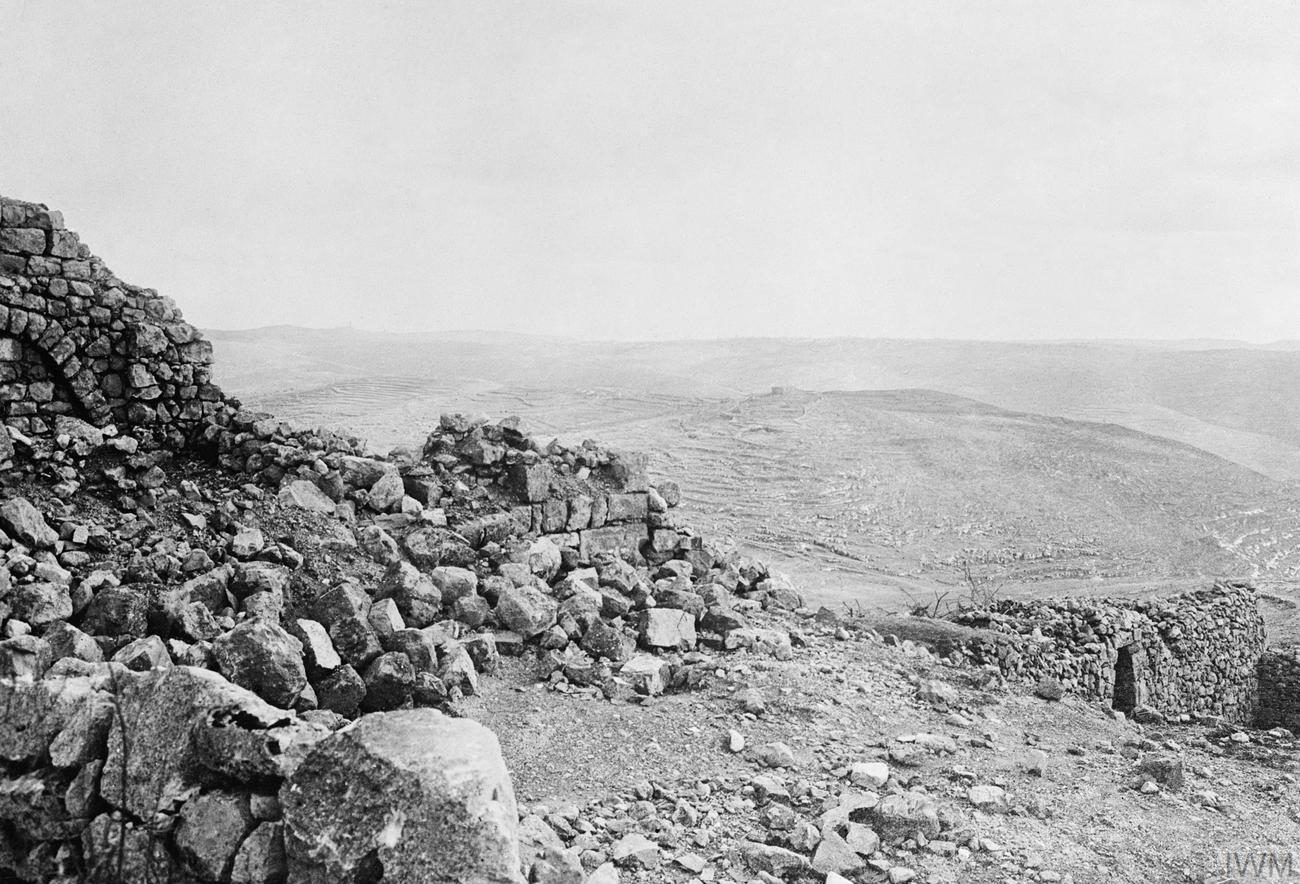
View from the summit of Nebi Samwil, after the battle

75th Division Insignia

The British first attempt to take Jerusalem, stalled for the lack of artillery support, the need for fresh troops and not least the weather condition and the strong Ottoman defence.

In the lull before their next attack the British used the opportunity to improve the roads and tracks in the area, in order to bring forward their heavy artillery and ammunition, water and other supplies. Allenby also decided to relieve XXI Corps with XX Corps which had had a quieter time on the coastal plain.

The Ottoman Army, however, did not sit back and conducted several attacks against the British forces at the end of November and beginning of December using tactics similar to those that would be used by the Germans in their Spring Offensive on the Western Front in March 1918. British reinforcement arrived which stemmed the Ottoman assault and they went over to the attack themselves on 7 December. The Ottoman force left Jerusalem over the night of 8/9 December and the civic authorities handed over the city to the British.

For their part in the battle the 75th Division divisional insignia became a key, representing that the battle was the key to the capture of Jerusalem. In recognition for their part in the battle, the British Empire regiments involved were awarded the battle honour Nebi Samwil.

== Bibliography ==
- Bruce, Anthony (11 December 2023). The Last Crusade, the Palestine Campaign in the First World War. London: John Murray. ISBN 978-0-7195-5432-2.
- Chappell, Mike (2005). The British Army in World War I (3): The Eastern Fronts. Vol. 3 of The British Army in World War I. Osprey Publishing. ISBN 978-1-84176-401-6.
