= Tomb of Samuel =

Tomb of biblical figure in Palestine

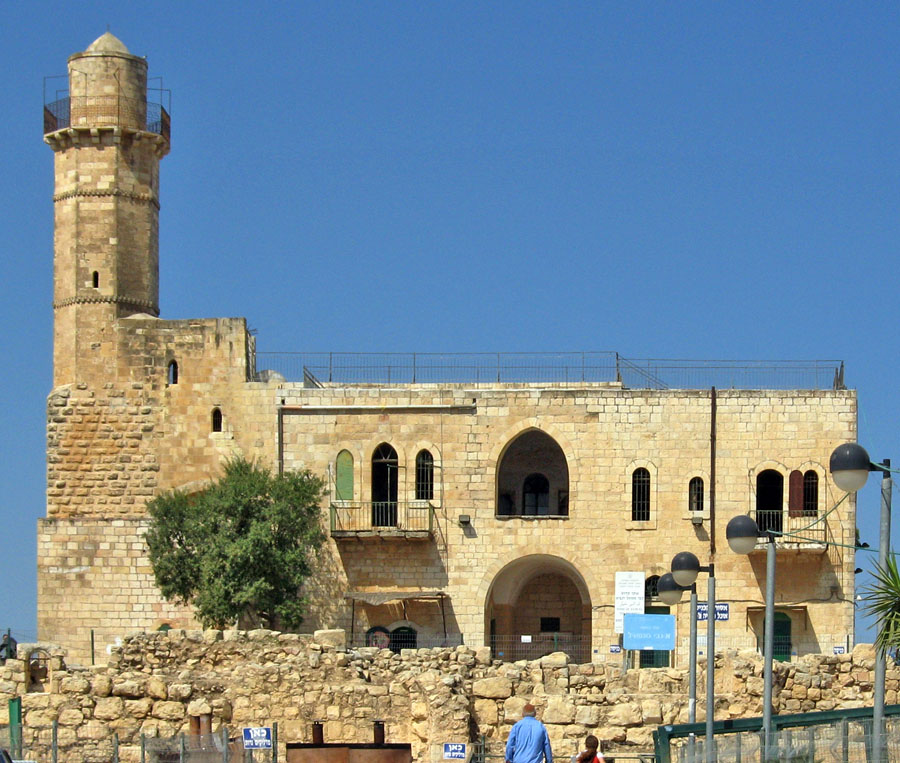
- Nabi Samwil mosque built on remains of Crusader-era fortress; the Tomb of Samuel is in a crypt below the Mamluk building.

- Location within State of Palestine
- 31.832978°N 35.181633°E

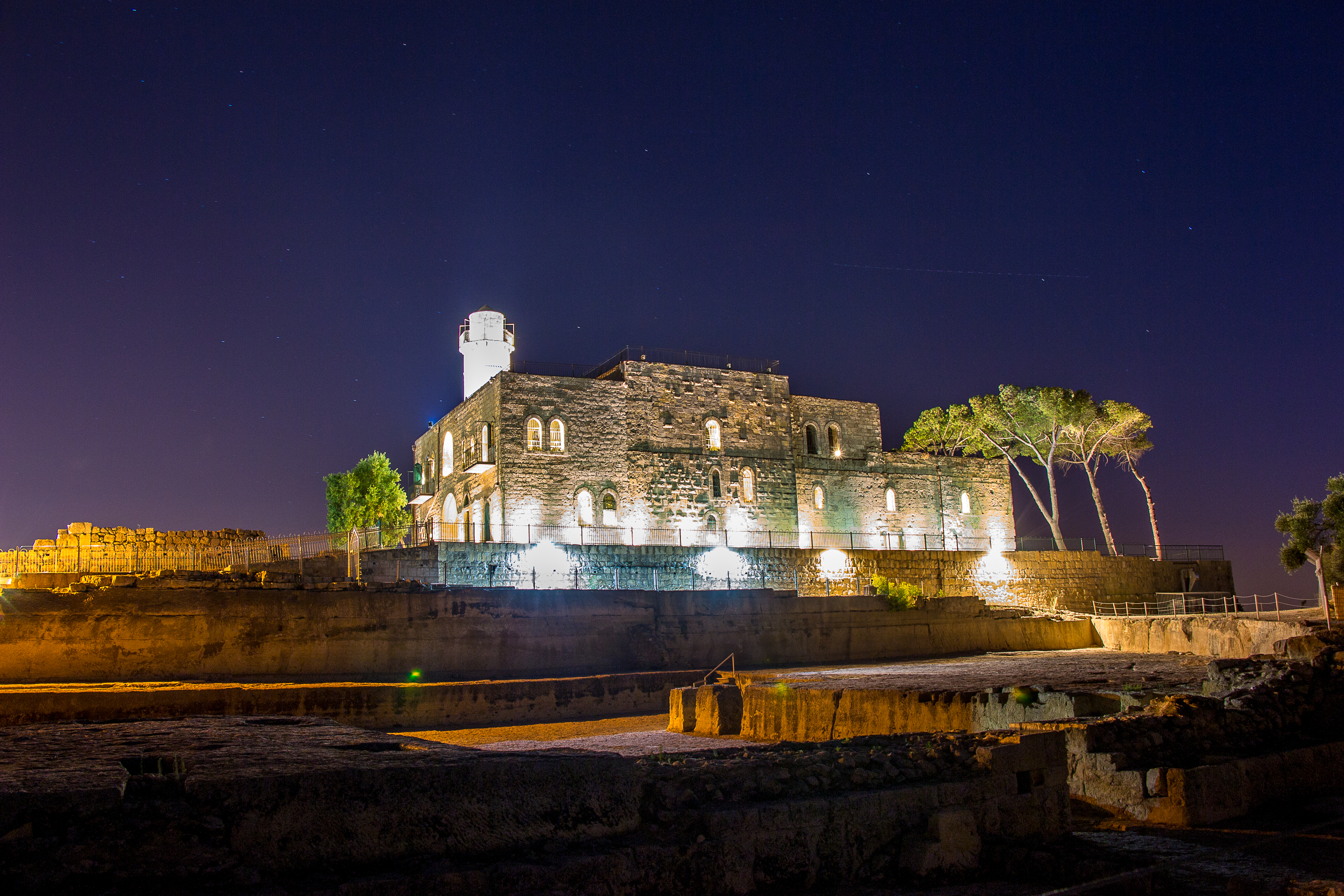
Nabi Samuel at night

The Tomb of Samuel (Arabic: النبي صموئيل, translit. an-Nabi Samu'il or Nebi Samwil, Hebrew: קבר שמואל הנביא, translit. Kever Shmuel ha-Navi), commonly known as Nebi Samuel or Nebi Samwil, is the traditional burial site of the biblical prophet Samuel, atop a steep hill at an elevation of 908 m (2,979 ft) above sea level, in the Palestinian village of Nabi Samwil, in the West Bank.

The site is of both religious and archaeological interest. In the 6th century, a monastery was built at the site in honor of Samuel, and during the early Arab period the place was known as Dir Samwil (the Samuel Monastery). In the 12th century, during the Crusader period, a fortress was built on the area.

The present structure is a mosque from the 14th century, built during the Mamluk period. The purported tomb itself is in an underground chamber which has been repurposed after 1967 as a synagogue, today with separate prayer areas for Jewish men and women.

Since the beginning of the Israeli occupation of the West Bank after the Six-Day War, the site is managed by the Israel Nature and Parks Authority.

== Location ==
The site is located around Nabi Samwil, a Palestinian village in the Seam Zone of the West Bank, an area of the Israeli-occupied West Bank separated from the rest of the territory by the Israeli West Bank barrier, with the surrounding Palestinian towns of Al Jib, Beit Hanina and Beit Iksa on the other side of the barrier. Nabi Samwil was classified as being in Area C of the West Bank under the Oslo Accords, which left Israel in administrative and military control of the territory pending the transfer of control to the Palestinian Authority. Such transfer, which the accords called for to be completed by 1997, has not occurred since the accords signing in 1995.

== History and archaeology ==
=== Iron Age and biblical identification ===
Yitzhak Magen conducted archaeological excavations from 1992 to 2003. On the southeastern slope is a 4-acre (16,000 m^{2}) urban settlement dating back to the 8th-7th centuries BCE, and remnants that Magen believed to be the Mizpah in Benjamin of the Book of Samuel. By contrast, Jeffrey Zorn concluded that there are no remains at the site, from the period in which the Samuel narratives are set, and it could therefore not be Mizpah. Magen's own conclusions have been criticised for stretching the evidence beyond the obvious implications, which he himself hints at:

We did not find any remains from the time of the Judges ... not a single structure or even a standing wall from this period. On this basis, it might be tempting to conclude that the site was unoccupied at this time ...

However, if Mizpah in Benjamin was Tell en-Nasbeh on the Nablus Road, Ishmael who had assassinated Gedaliah would not have fled to Ammon via Gibeon which is located to the west near Nabi Samwil which overlooks Jerusalem. Furthermore, Judas Machabeus, preparing for war with the Syrians, gathered his men "to Maspha, over against Jerusalem: for in Maspha was a place of prayer heretofore in Israel".

Some identify the location with the biblical temple of Gibeon, though consensus among experts places Gibeon at the village of al Jib.

=== Byzantine church and Samuel tradition ===
In the 6th century, a monastery was built at the site in honor of Samuel, and during the early Arab period the place was known as Dir Samwil (the Samuel Monastery). There is no clear evidence that the place was considered the tomb of Samuel, or indeed a place of religious significance, before Byzantine times. Magen argues that the builders of the monastery did not believe they were building over the tomb of Samuel, instead regarding their construction only as a memorial. The fifth century writer Jerome, for example, argues that Samuel's remains were moved to Chalcedon, on the orders of Emperor Arcadius; this would be a century before the Byzantine monastery was built.

A sixth-century Christian author identified the site as Samuel's burial place. According to the Bible, however, the prophet is buried at his hometown, Ramah (1Samuel 25:1, 28:3), to the east of the hill which is located near Geba.

=== Crusader period: church and fortress ===
Raymond of Aguilers, who wrote a chronicle of the First Crusade (1096–1099), relates that on the morning of June 7, 1099, the Crusaders reached the summit of Nebi Samuel, and when they saw the city of Jerusalem, which they had not yet seen, they fell to the ground and wept in joy; the Crusaders named the place "Mount of Joy" (Latin Mons Gaudi, French Mont de Joie or Montjoie), for this reason. The Crusaders built a fortress on the spot, on an area of 100 x 50 m.

The 12th-century Jewish traveller Benjamin of Tudela visited the site when he travelled the land in 1173. According to him, the Crusaders had found the bones of Samuel "close to a Jewish synagogue" in Ramla on the coastal plain (which he misidentified as biblical Ramah), and reburied them here, at this site (which he mistook for biblical Shiloh). He wrote that a large church dedicated to St. Samuel of Shiloh had been built over the reburied remains. This may refer to the abbey church of St. Samuel of Montjoie built by Premonstratensian canons and inhabited from 1141 or 1142 to 1244. In 1187 seven of its canons were martyred during Saladin's reconquest of the Holy Land.

== Modern period ==
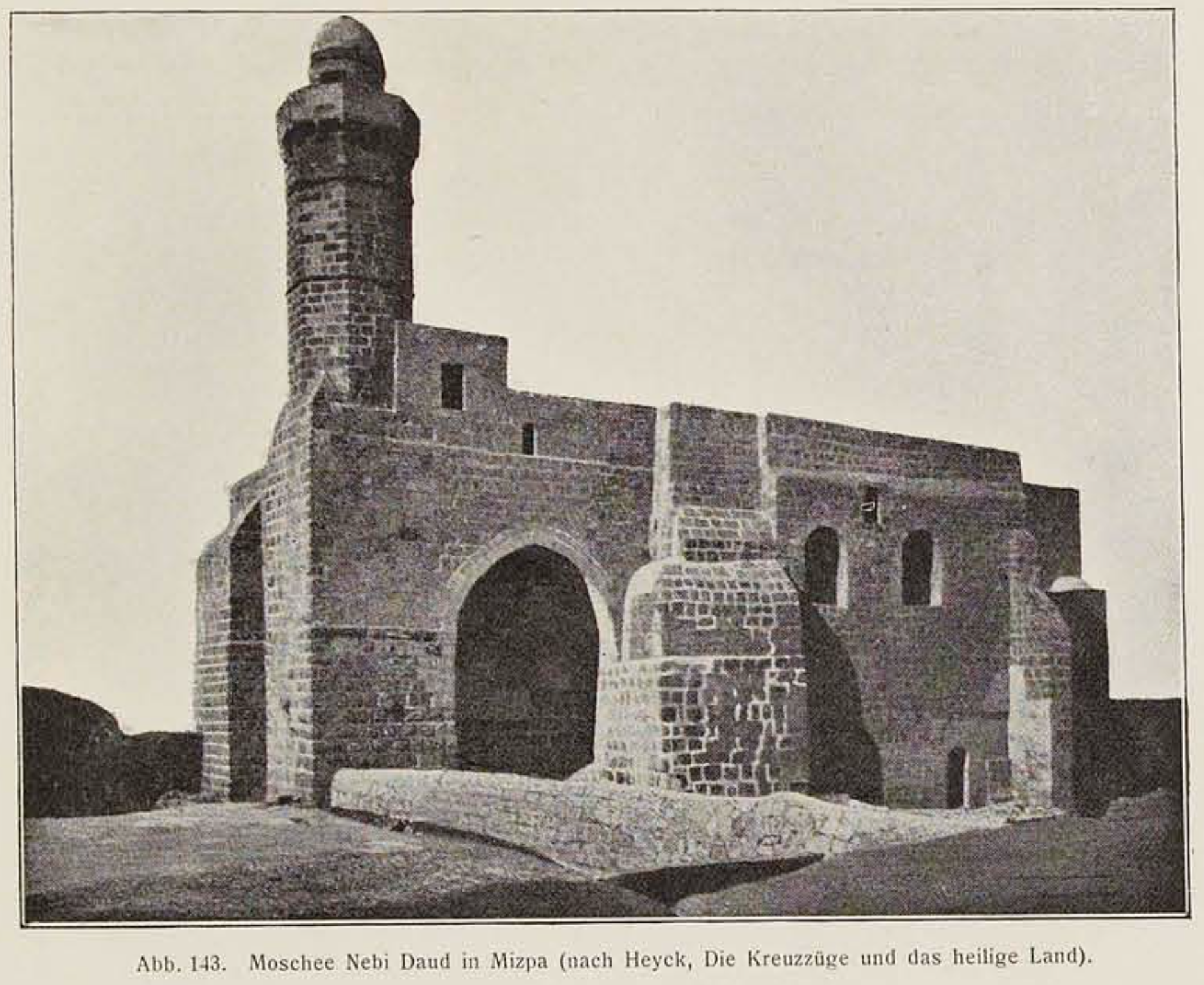
Mosque of Nebi Samuel, early 1900s

The present structure is a mosque from the 14th century, built during the Mamluk period.

=== Nearby Jewish village ===
Nachalat Yisrael – Rama was an association founded in 1886 for the purpose of establishing a Jewish settlement close to the traditional tomb of Samuel. The association counted among its sixty founding members, most of which came from Jerusalem's Old Yishuv, the rabbis Yaakov Mendelbaum, Yitzchak Rubinstein and Yitzchak Zvi Rivlin. Rabbi Yitzchak Zvi Rivlin (1857–1934), a first cousin of Yosef Rivlin, was known as the Living Talmud due to his genius, and later, in the 1920s, acted as the chairman of the association. The project was held back by numerous difficulties. The association successfully sold the land to Russian Jews, but these didn't manage to establish the envisaged moshava. Only at the beginning of the 20th century were the houses finally legalised, and fifteen association members moved in. Moshava Nachalat Yisrael Rama was the resulting experimental settlement. The residents, Yemenite and Ashkenazi Jews, received arms for self-protection, and large plots of additional land were bought by the association in the area. The outbreak of World War I created new legal problems. The village had to be abandoned during the 1929 riots, when the Arab neighbours destroyed the houses and removed the border stones. Today's Ramot neighbourhood stands in the same area.

=== World War I ===
Nebi Samuel's strategic location made it the site of battles during the British conquest of Ottoman Palestine in 1917, and the village was badly damaged from artillery fire and abandoned. It was resettled in 1921, but various difficulties lead it to again disband after a number of years. The mosque built in 1730 was damaged in the battle between the British and the Turks in 1917. It was restored after the war.

=== 1948 and 1967 wars ===
The location was again significant in the 1948 Arab–Israeli War, and the 1967 Six-Day War, and was used by artillery of the Jordanian Arab Legion to bombard Jerusalem, in addition to being a base for attacks on Jewish traffic during the 1948 siege of Jerusalem.

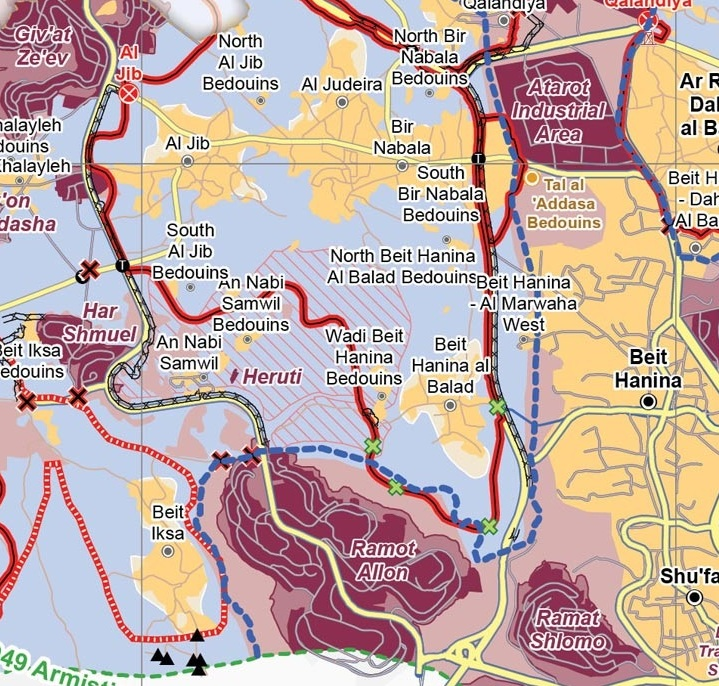
Nebi Samuel "National Park" (diagonal hashed area)

=== Post-1967 ===
The tomb, which is in Area C, is located on the Israeli side of the Israeli West Bank barrier with the nearby Giv'at Ze'ev. Nebi Samuel and the surrounding archeological excavations are now part of a national park. The original village located on the hilltop is still inhabited by 20 Palestinian families.

Both Jewish and Muslim prayers are held at the area, but the purported tomb of Samuel itself is in an underground chamber which has been repurposed after 1967 as a synagogue, today with separate prayer areas for Jewish men and women. Many religious Jews visit the tomb on the 28th of Iyar, the anniversary of Samuel the Prophet's death.
