= Kharruba =

Kharruba خروبة
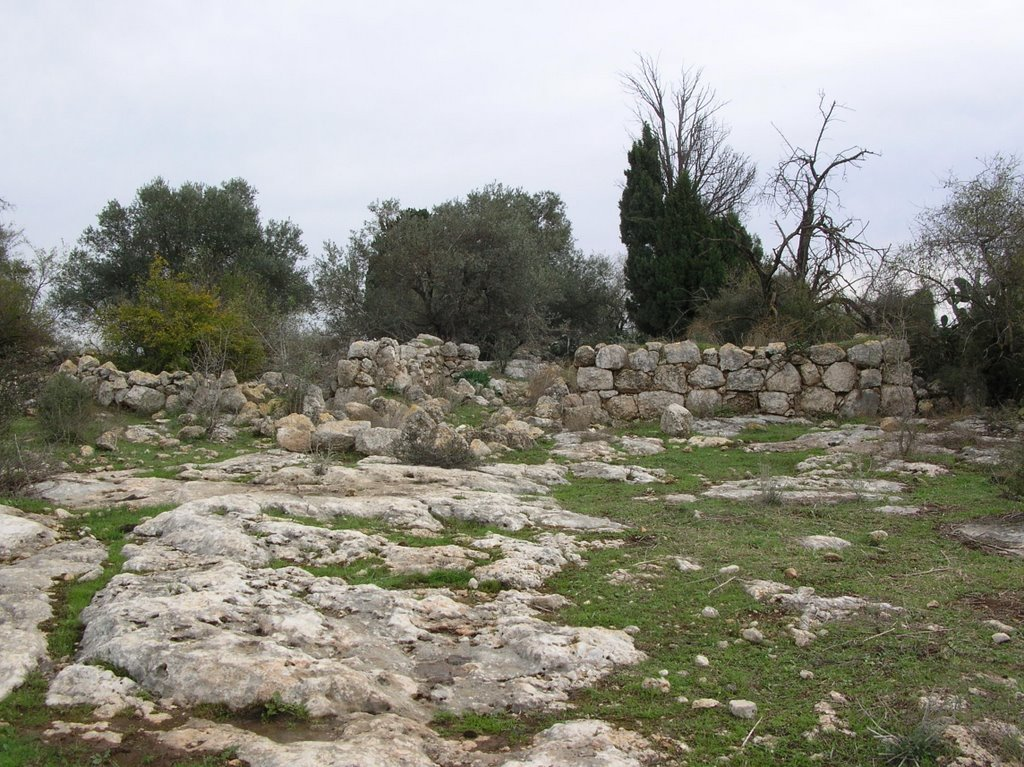
- Kharruba, 2008
- Etymology: The carob, or locust tree
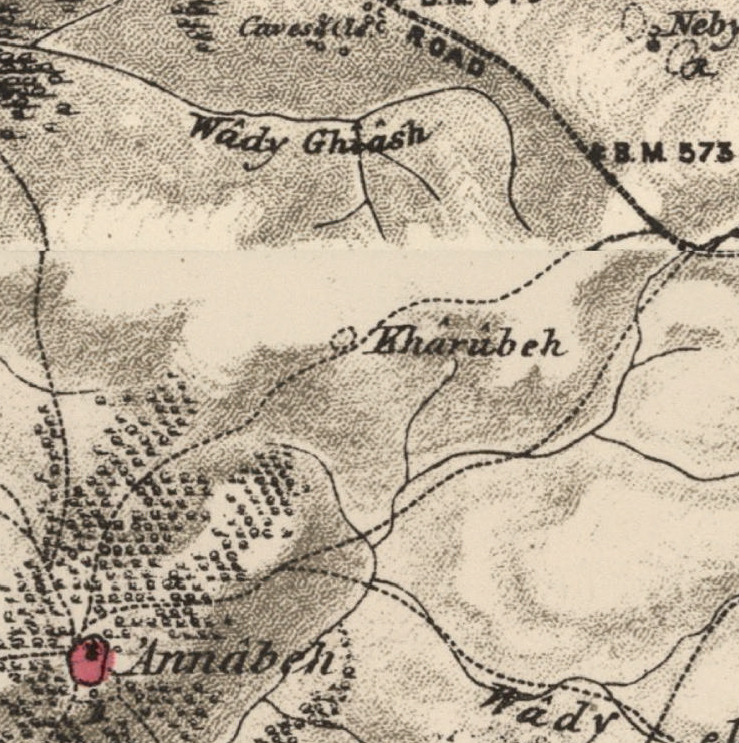
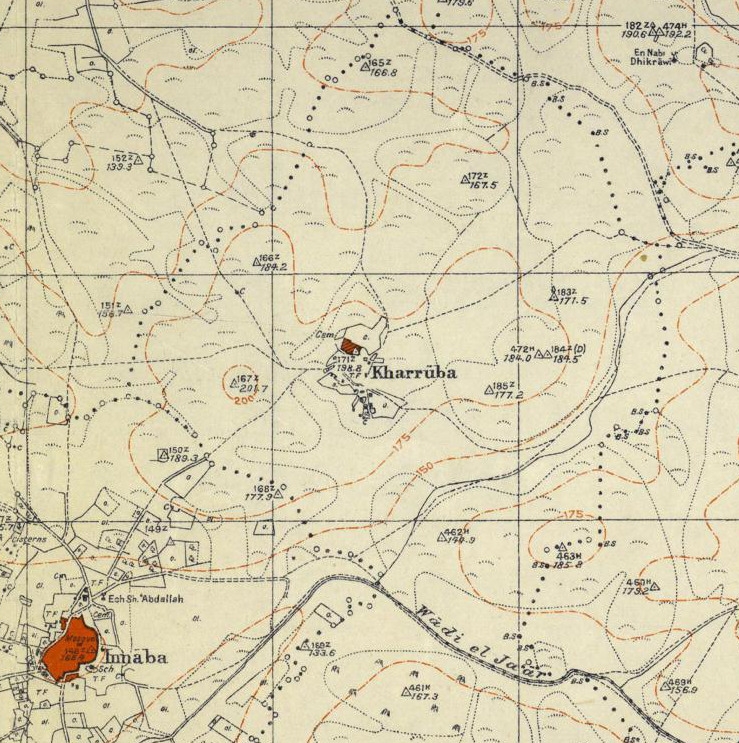
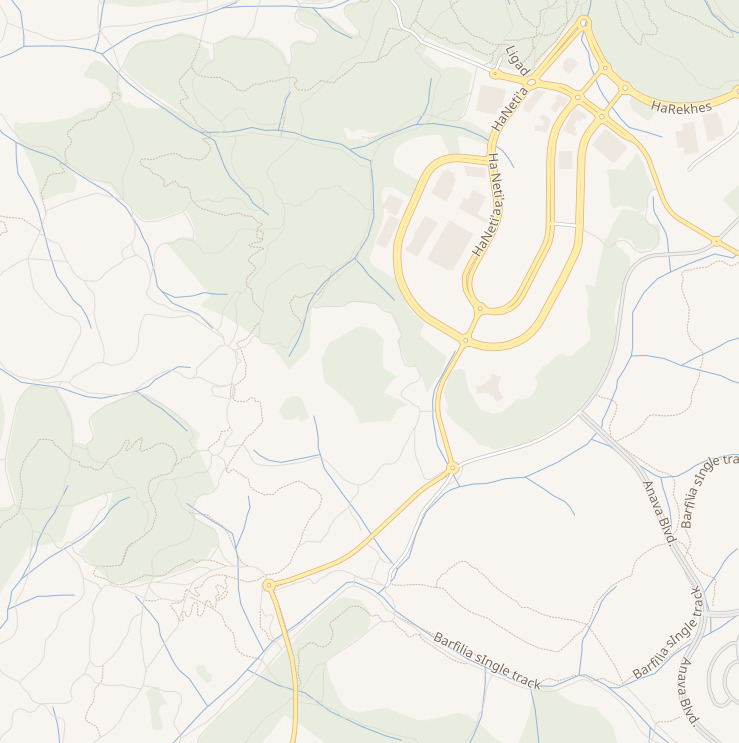
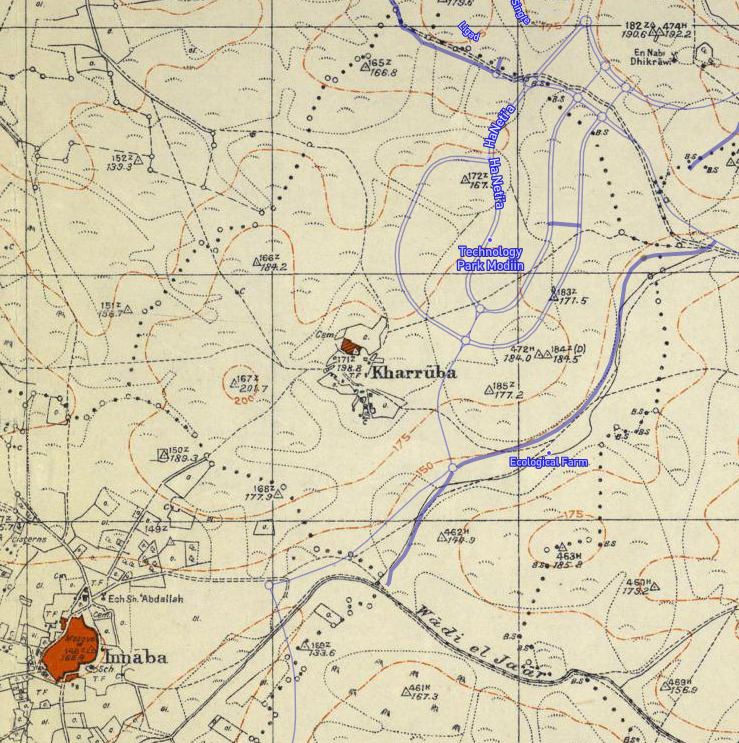
- 1870s map 1940s map modern map 1940s with modern overlay map A series of historical maps of the area around Kharruba (click the buttons)

- Location within Mandatory Palestine
- Coordinates: 31°54′44″N 34°57′38″E
- Palestine grid: 146/146
- Geopolitical entity: Mandatory Palestine
- Subdistrict: Ramle
- Date of depopulation: July 12–15, 1948

Population (1945)
  - Total: 170
- Cause(s) of depopulation: Military assault by Yishuv forces

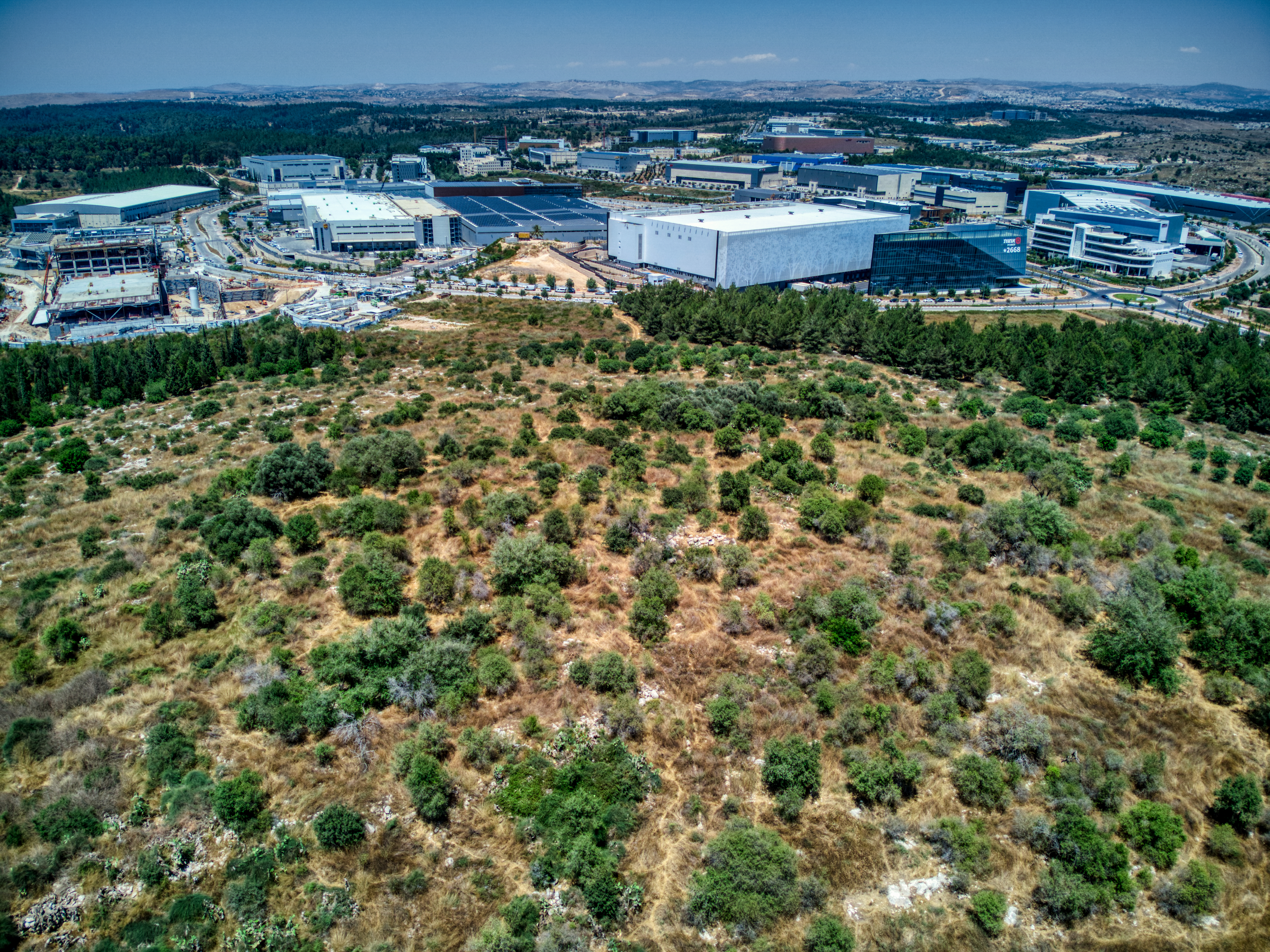
Kharruba remains and beyond them the industrial zone of Modi'in

Kharruba was a Palestinian Arab village in the Ramle Subdistrict of Mandatory Palestine, near Modi'in. It was located 8 km east of Ramla. It was depopulated on July 12, 1948, during the 1948 Arab–Israeli War.

== History ==
The name Kharruba, in its current form, is an Arabic one: "a carob tree".

It may be Kfar Hariba or Kfar Haruba mentioned in the Jerusalem Talmud as home of two brothers who fought the Romans during the Bar Kokhba revolt.

=== Ottoman era ===
In 1552, Kharruba was a cultivated place (mazra'a). Part of the tax revenues of Kharruba were endowed to the Haseki Sultan Imaret in Jerusalem, founded by Haseki Hürrem Sultan, the favourite wife of Suleiman the Magnificent. Administratively, Kharruba belonged to the Sub-district of Ramla in the District of Gaza.

Kharruba appeared in Ottoman tax registers compiled in 1596 under the name of Harnuba, in the Nahiyas of Ramla, of the Gaza Sanjak. It was indicated as empty (hali), though 25% taxes were paid on agricultural products. These included wheat, barley, summer crops, vineyards, fruit trees, sesame, goats, beehives, in an addition to occasional revenues; a total of 4,000 akçe.

In 1838, it was noted as a Muslim village, Khurrubeh, in the Ibn Humar area in the District of Er-Ramleh.

In 1863, Victor Guérin described Kharruba as a hamlet of a few huts. He noticed the remains of a medieval fort and suggested it might be the Crusader castle Arnaldi. The following decade, the PEF's "Survey of Western Palestine" found only ruins.

By the beginning of the 20th century, residents from Beit Iksa resettled the site, establishing it as a dependency – or satellite village – of their home village.

=== British Mandate era ===
During the British Mandate period, Kharruba was one of the key areas of Lime production for the developing urban centers along Palestine's coastal plain.

At the time of the 1931 census, Kharruba had 21 occupied houses and a population of 119 inhabitants, all Muslims.

In the 1945 statistics, the village had a population of 170 Muslims. The total land area was 3,374 dunams, of this, a total of 1,620 dunums were used for cereals, 25 dunums were irrigated or used for orchards, while 3 dunams were classified as built-up public areas.

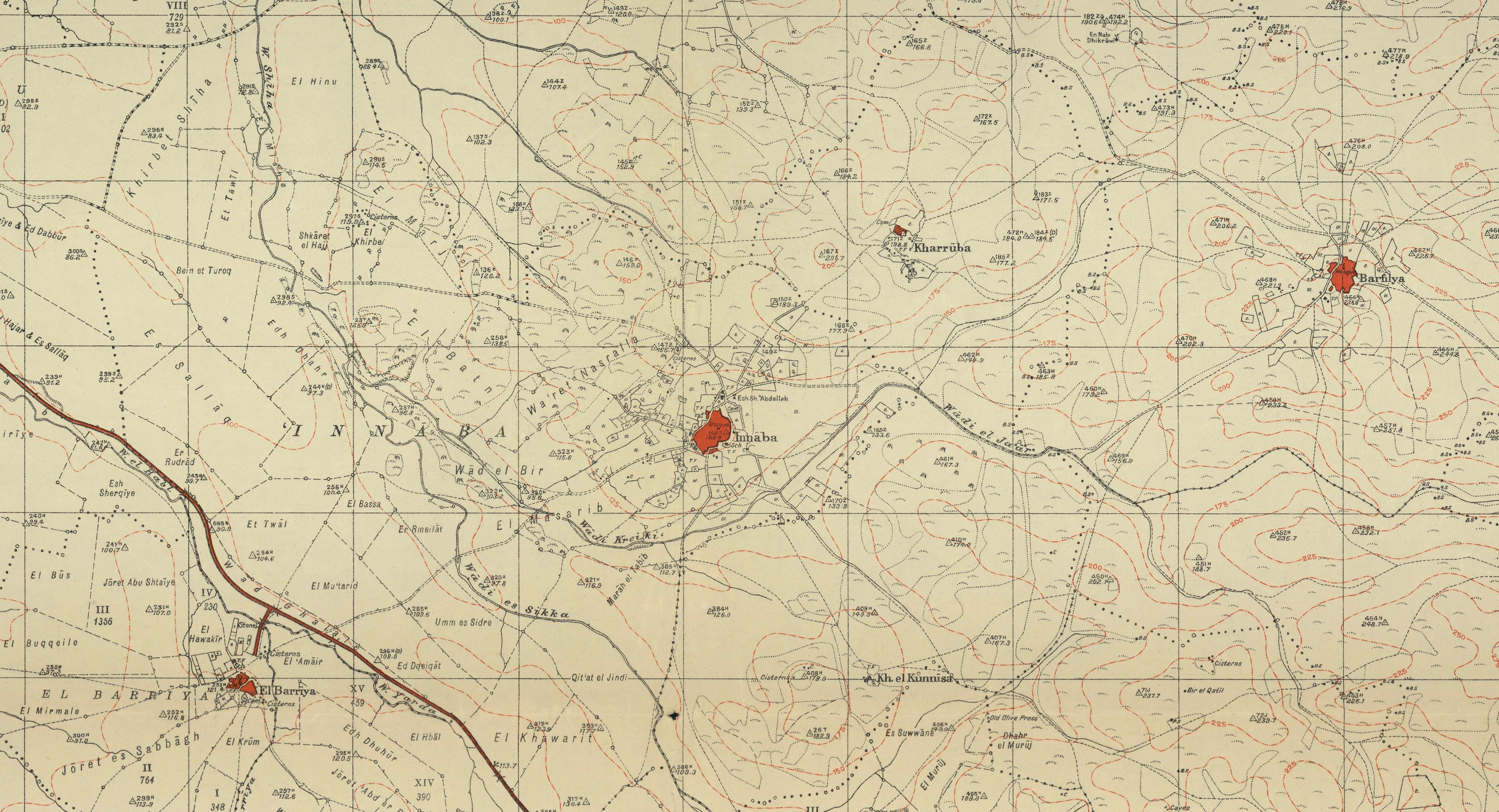
Kharruba 1942 1:20,000

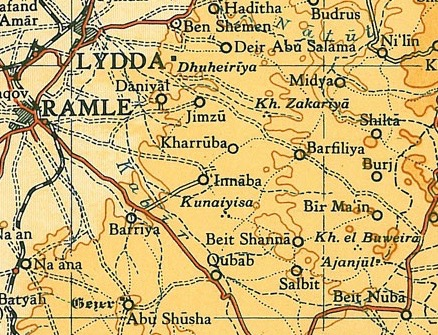
Kharruba 1945 1:250,000

=== 1948, aftermath ===
It was depopulated during the 1948 Arab–Israeli War on July 12, 1948, by the Yiftach Brigade which reported that it had blown up the houses and "cleared the village".

In 1992 the village site was described: "The site is covered with the stone rubble of the destroyed houses, overgrown with vegetation. Many of the plants that grow on the site are the ones that Palestinians traditionally planted near their homes: cactuses, castor oil (ricinus) plants, and cypress, Christ's thorn, and olive trees. The surrounding land is used by the Israelis as grazing ground."

== Archaeology ==
A site called Haruba is mentioned in the Copper Scroll, the only one of the Dead Sea Scrolls engraved on copper rather than written on parchment. Modern scholars do not believe it to be the site mentioned in the scroll.

In 2012, five suspected antiquities robbers were caught at Kharruba, after damaging a mikveh (ritual bath) dating to the Second Temple period and trenches used as hiding places during the Bar Kokhba revolt.

== Bibliography ==
- Conder, C.R.; Kitchener, H.H. (1883). The Survey of Western Palestine: Memoirs of the Topography, Orography, Hydrography, and Archaeology. Vol. 3. London: Committee of the Palestine Exploration Fund.
- Department of Statistics (1945). Village Statistics, April, 1945. Government of Palestine.
- Guérin, V. (1868). Description Géographique Historique et Archéologique de la Palestine (in French). Vol. 1: Judee, pt. 1. Paris: L'Imprimerie Nationale.
- Guérin, V. (1875). Description Géographique Historique et Archéologique de la Palestine (in French). Vol. 2: Samarie, pt. 2. Paris: L'Imprimerie Nationale. (p. 394)
- Hadawi, S. (1970). Village Statistics of 1945: A Classification of Land and Area ownership in Palestine. Palestine Liberation Organization Research Center. Archived from the original on 2018-12-08.
- Hütteroth, W.-D.; Abdulfattah, K. (1977). Historical Geography of Palestine, Transjordan and Southern Syria in the Late 16th Century. Erlanger Geographische Arbeiten, Sonderband 5. Erlangen, Germany: Vorstand der Fränkischen Geographischen Gesellschaft. ISBN 3-920405-41-2.
- Khalidi, W. (1992). All That Remains: The Palestinian Villages Occupied and Depopulated by Israel in 1948. Washington D.C.: Institute for Palestine Studies. ISBN 0-88728-224-5.
- Mills, E., ed. (1932). Census of Palestine 1931. Population of Villages, Towns and Administrative Areas. Jerusalem: Government of Palestine.
- Morris, B. (2004). The Birth of the Palestinian Refugee Problem Revisited. Cambridge University Press. ISBN 978-0-521-00967-6.
- Palmer, E.H. (1881). The Survey of Western Palestine: Arabic and English Name Lists Collected During the Survey by Lieutenants Conder and Kitchener, R. E. Transliterated and Explained by E.H. Palmer. Committee of the Palestine Exploration Fund.
- Robinson, E.; Smith, E. (1841). Biblical Researches in Palestine, Mount Sinai and Arabia Petraea: A Journal of Travels in the year 1838. Vol. 3. Boston: Crocker & Brewster.
