= Beit Iksa =

- Municipality type D (Village council)

Arabic transcription(s)
  - Arabic: بيت إكسا
  - Latin: Beit Exa (official); Bayt Iksa (unofficial)
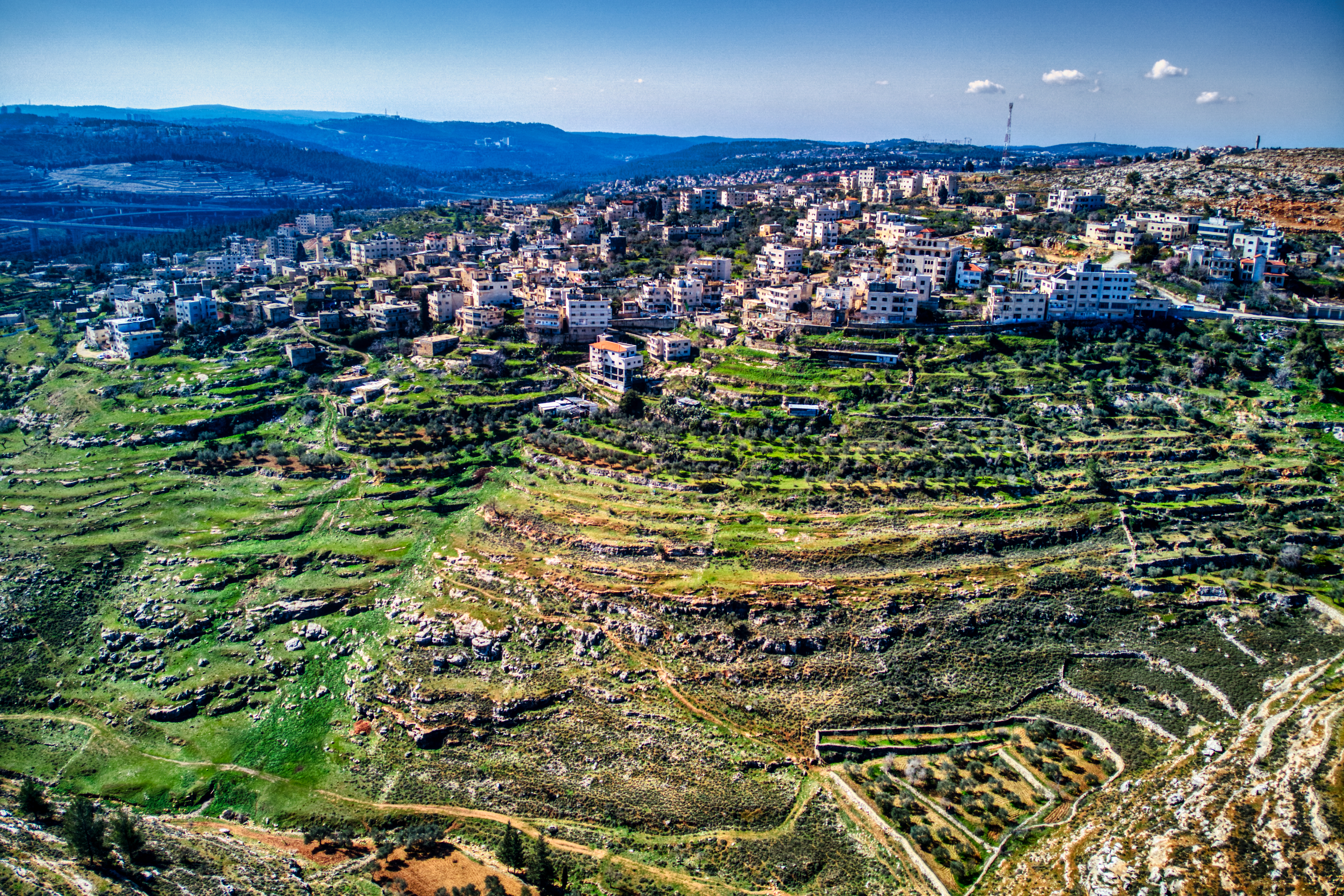
- View of Beit Iksa, 2023
- Interactive map of Beit Iksa
- Location of Beit Iksa within Palestine
- Coordinates: 31°49′05″N 35°10′50″E
- Palestine grid: 167/136
- State: Palestine
- Governorate: Jerusalem

Government
  - Type: Village council
  - Head of Municipality: Bajes Abud

Area
  - Total: 7.7 km^{2} (3.0 sq mi)
- Elevation: 747 m (2,451 ft)

Population (2017)
  - Total: 1,773
  - Density: 230/km^{2} (600/sq mi)
- Name meaning: "The house of Iksa"
- Website: www.beit-iksa.com

Beit Iksa (Arabic: بيت إكسا;) is a Palestinian village in the Jerusalem Governorate of the State of Palestine, located northwest of Jerusalem in the West Bank.

The village is surrounded on all sides by the Israeli West Bank barrier, and outside Palestinians are denied access through the one Israeli checkpoint leading to it. In 2014 Israeli military authorities announced they would confiscate a further 3,167 acres of Beit Iksa lands, leaving the township, according to the village head, Saada al-Khatib, as a 2,500-dunum area.

Beit Iksa contains two primary schools run by the Palestinian National Authority. Students attending secondary school travel to Jerusalem or nearby towns for education.

== Location ==
Beit Iksa is a Palestinian village located 6.5 kilometers (4.0 mi) (horizontally) north-west of Jerusalem. It is bordered by Beit Hanina al Balad and Shu'fat to the east, An Nabi Samwil to the north, Beit Surik and Lifta to the west.

== Etymology ==
According to Palmer Beit Iksa means "The house of Iksa" According to Marom et al.; the second component traces back to the Hebrew Ks’, an anthroponym named after the day of the full moon (ks’). In this context, it may refer to a calendar term, possibly indicating a festival. The residents associate the anthroponym Kisa with the founder of their village.

In the 1870s, locals informed Clermont-Ganneau that the village's alternative name was Umm-el-ela. Beni Zeid settlers from the north who obtained permission for the site gave the village a new name, Beit Iksa. During the Crusader period, the village was known as Jenanara, according to its inhabitants.

== History ==
Beit Iksa lies on one of the historical routes that joined the Mediterranean coastal plain with Jerusalem, and archeological excavations conducted south of the village have yielded remains from the Hellenistic, Early Roman, late Byzantine and Umayyad periods, which the archaeologists believe belonged to an ancient settlement close by on the southwest outskirts of Beit Iksa.

=== Ottoman era ===
In 1517, the village was incorporated into the Ottoman Empire with the rest of Palestine.

In 1552, Beit Iksa was an inhabited village. Haseki Hürrem Sultan, the favourite wife of Suleiman the Magnificent, endowed the tax revenues of Beit Iksa to its Haseki Sultan Imaret in Jerusalem. Administratively, Beit Iksa belonged to the District of Jerusalem. During this time, as in later periods, the residents of the village cultivated the lands of Kharruba.

In the 1596 tax-records it appeared under the name of Bayt Kisa, located in the Nahiye of Jerusalem in the Sanjak of the Mutasarrifate of Jerusalem. It had a population of 79 households, all Muslims. The inhabitants paid a fixed tax rate of 33.3% on agricultural products, including wheat, barley, olive trees, vineyards, fruit trees, orchard, goats or bee hives, and a press for olives or grapes; a total of 18,000 akçe.

In 1838, Beit Iksa was noted as a Muslim village, part of the El-Kuds district.

In 1841 a local leader (nāzir), Abd al-Qadir al-Khatib, built an Ottoman castle located in the southern part of the village, while one of his brother built a smaller version five years later. In 1863, the French explorer Victor Guérin passed by the village and was told it had 300 inhabitants. He noted that the surroundings were cultivated with vines and olive trees. An Ottoman village list of about 1870 showed that "Bet Iksa" had 70 houses and a population of 147, though the population count included only men. According to Charles Simon Clermont-Ganneau, he was informed in 1874 that the inhabitants belonged to the Beni Zeid tribe and that the village earlier had been named Umm el Ela.

In 1883, the PEF's Survey of Western Palestine described it as a "village of moderate size, with stone houses, and a well on the north, near which is a tree sacred to an otherwise unknown prophet, Nabī Leimûun. There are a few olives round the village."

Around 1896 the population of Beit Iksa was estimated to be about 714 persons.

By the beginning of the 20th century, residents from Beit Iksa settled Kharruba near al-Ramla, establishing it as a dependency – or satellite village – of their home village.

=== British Mandate era ===
In the 1922 census of Palestine conducted by the British Mandate authorities, "Bait Iksa" had a population of 791, all Muslims, increasing in the 1931 census to a population of 1003, in 221 houses.

In the 1945 statistics, Beit Iksa had a population of 1,410, all Muslims, with 8,179 dunams of land, according to an official land and population survey. Of this, 1,427 dunams were plantations and irrigable land, 2,690 used for cereals, while 43 dunams were built-up (urban) land.

=== Jordanian era ===
In April 1948, most of the villagers fled following the fall of Deir Yassin and the Haganah entered the village destroying many buildings. In the wake of the 1948 Arab–Israeli War, and after the 1949 Armistice Agreements, Beit Iksa came under Jordanian rule. It was annexed by Jordan in 1950.

In 1961, the population of Beit Iksa was 1,177.

=== After 1967 ===
Since the Six-Day War in 1967, Beit Iksa has been under Israeli occupation.

After the 1995 accords, 7.4% of village land was classified as Area B, the remaining 92.6% as Area C. Over half of the land lies beyond the confines of the West Bank separation barrier.

The majority of the present population came to the village as refugees in the wake of the Six Day War, when its original inhabitants were forced to flee. In November 2014, Israeli authorities delivered a notification to the village, declaring the intention of confiscating 12,852 dunums (3,176 acres) of their land, including the areas of Haraeq al-Arab, Thahr Biddu, Numus, and Khatab. The given reason for the confiscation states that the land is required "for military purposes". Landholders were given until 31 December 2017 to remain on their land. Israeli settlements, including Ramot, have been built on 1,500 dunums (371 acres) on village land, and according to the village major, the order came through after the Israel government announced plans for a further 244 housing units to be built in Ramot. In addition, Israel has confiscated 15 dunums for the Israeli settlement of Har Samuel, part of the Giv'at Ze'ev settlement.

After the 7 October 2023 attack Israel has restricted movement in the village, so that “Living in Beit Iksa is like living in a prison", according to the Mayor. Since 2008, entry to the village is through an Israeli-controlled checkpoint, and entry is only given to the villages 1,800-1,900 registered residents, in addition to professionals (medics, teachers) with permits. There are "strict rules" for entry of "food, water tanks, sheep, construction materials". In February, 2024, the Israel Border Police at the checkpoint opened "insane, indiscriminate gunfire" killling a 4 year old girl from Beit Iksa.

== Population ==
According to the Palestinian Central Bureau of Statistics (PCBS), Beit Iksa had a population of approximately 1,600 inhabitants in mid-year 2006. From the population, over 80% are Palestinian refugees. By 2014 the population had grown to some 1,700. By 2017, the population was 1,773.

According to the land researcher Sami Hadawi, the population grew to 1,410 in 1945. However, following Israel's occupation after the 1967 Six-Day War, Beit Iksa counted 633 inhabitants, due to the number of residents that fled the village. Most of the village's inhabitants hold Palestinian ID cards and live in Beit Iksa's built-up area of 417 dunams or 5.4% of the village's total land area of 7,734 dunams.

== Shrines ==
In the 1920, Tawfiq Canaan noted several shrines, or maqams here. Es-seh Mbarak/Imbarak had one in the public cemetery, with a niche, for holding oil-lamps, etc, in the northern side of the shrine.

A shrine for Sheik Hasan was badly damaged during WWI.

A shrine for Sheik Iteyim was also used as a madafeh, or guest room, in addition to being used as a school room.

== Bibliography ==
- Aharonovich, Yevgeny (2018-03-08). "Beit Iksa". Hadashot Arkheologiyot – Excavations and Surveys in Israel (130).
- Barron, J. B., ed. (1923). Palestine: Report and General Abstracts of the Census of 1922. Government of Palestine.
- Canaan, T. (1927). Mohammedan Saints and Sanctuaries in Palestine. London: Luzac & Co. (p. 222)
- Clermont-Ganneau, C.S. (1899). [ARP] Archaeological Researches in Palestine 1873–1874, translated from the French by J. McFarlane. Vol. 1. London: Palestine Exploration Fund.
- Clermont-Ganneau, C.S. (1896). [ARP] Archaeological Researches in Palestine 1873–1874, translated from the French by J. McFarlane. Vol. 2. London: Palestine Exploration Fund.
- Conder, C.R.; Kitchener, H. H. (1883). The Survey of Western Palestine: Memoirs of the Topography, Orography, Hydrography, and Archaeology. Vol. 3. London: Committee of the Palestine Exploration Fund.
- Government of Jordan, Department of Statistics (1964). First Census of Population and Housing. Volume I: Final Tables; General Characteristics of the Population (PDF).
- Government of Palestine, Department of Statistics (1945). Village Statistics, April, 1945.
- Guérin, V. (1868). Description Géographique Historique et Archéologique de la Palestine (in French). Vol. 1: Judee, pt. 1. Paris: L'Imprimerie Nationale.
- Guérin, V. (1875). Description Géographique Historique et Archéologique de la Palestine (in French). Vol. 2: Samarie, pt. 2. Paris: L'Imprimerie Nationale. p. 400
- Hadawi, S. (1970). Village Statistics of 1945: A Classification of Land and Area ownership in Palestine. Palestine Liberation Organization Research Centre.
- Hartmann, M. (1883). "Die Ortschaftenliste des Liwa Jerusalem in dem türkischen Staatskalender für Syrien auf das Jahr 1288 der Flucht (1871)". Zeitschrift des Deutschen Palästina-Vereins. 6: 102–149.
- Hütteroth, W.-D.; Abdulfattah, K. (1977). Historical Geography of Palestine, Transjordan and Southern Syria in the Late 16th Century. Erlanger Geographische Arbeiten, Sonderband 5. Erlangen, Germany: Vorstand der Fränkischen Geographischen Gesellschaft. ISBN 3-920405-41-2.
- Mills, E., ed. (1932). Census of Palestine 1931. Population of Villages, Towns and Administrative Areas. Jerusalem: Government of Palestine.
- Morris, B. (1987). The birth of the Palestinian refugee problem, 1947–1949. Cambridge University Press. ISBN 0-521-33028-9.
- Palmer, E. H. (1881). The Survey of Western Palestine: Arabic and English Name Lists Collected During the Survey by Lieutenants Conder and Kitchener, R. E. Transliterated and Explained by E.H. Palmer. Committee of the Palestine Exploration Fund.
- Robinson, E.; Smith, E. (1841). Biblical Researches in Palestine, Mount Sinai and Arabia Petraea: A Journal of Travels in the year 1838. Vol. 2. Boston: Crocker & Brewster.
- Robinson, E.; Smith, E. (1841). Biblical Researches in Palestine, Mount Sinai and Arabia Petraea: A Journal of Travels in the year 1838. Vol. 3. Boston: Crocker & Brewster.
- Schick, C. (1896). "Zur Einwohnerzahl des Bezirks Jerusalem". Zeitschrift des Deutschen Palästina-Vereins. 19: 120–127.
- Sharon, M. (1999). Corpus Inscriptionum Arabicarum Palaestinae, B-C. Vol. 2. BRILL. ISBN 9004110836.
- Socin, A. (1879). "Alphabetisches Verzeichniss von Ortschaften des Paschalik Jerusalem". Zeitschrift des Deutschen Palästina-Vereins. 2: 135–163.
