= 1 Samuel 6 =

First Book of Samuel chapter

- ← chapter 5 chapter 7 →
- The pages containing the Books of Samuel (1 & 2 Samuel) in Leningrad Codex (1008 CE).
- Book: First book of Samuel
- Hebrew Bible part: Nevi'im
- Order in the Hebrew part: 3
- Category: Former Prophets
- Christian Bible part: Old Testament
- Order in the Christian part: 9

1 Samuel 6 is the sixth chapter of the First Book of Samuel in the Old Testament of the Christian Bible or the first part of the Books of Samuel in the Hebrew Bible. According to Jewish tradition the book was attributed to the prophet Samuel, with additions by the prophets Gad and Nathan, but modern scholars view it as a composition of a number of independent texts of various ages from c. 630–540 BCE. This chapter describes how the Ark of Covenant was returned to Israel by the Philistines, a part of the "Ark Narrative" (1 Samuel 4:1–7:1) within a section concerning the life of Samuel (1 Samuel 1:1–7:17).

== Text ==
This chapter was originally written in the Hebrew language. It is divided into 21 verses.

=== Textual witnesses ===
Some early manuscripts containing the text of this chapter in Hebrew are of the Masoretic Text tradition, which includes the Codex Cairensis (895), Aleppo Codex (10th century), and Codex Leningradensis (1008). Fragments containing parts of this chapter in Hebrew were found among the Dead Sea Scrolls including 4Q51 (4QSam^{a}; 100–50 BCE) with extant verses 1–13, 16–18, 20–21.

Extant ancient manuscripts of a translation into Koine Greek known as the Septuagint (originally was made in the last few centuries BCE) include Codex Vaticanus (B; $\mathfrak{G}$^{B}; 4th century) and Codex Alexandrinus (A; $\mathfrak{G}$^{A}; 5th century). (Note: The whole book of 1 Samuel is missing from the extant Codex Sinaiticus.)

== Places ==
Places mentioned in this chapter
- Ashdod
- Ashkelon
- Beth Shemesh
- Ekron
- Gath
- Gaza
- Kiriath Jearim

== Period ==
The event in this chapter happened at the end of judges period in Israel, about 1100 BC.

== The Ark returned to Israel (6:1–19) ==
The Philistines realized that the Ark of the Covenant had to be returned to Israel to stop the plagues (verse 2, cf. 1 Samuel 5:11), so they consulted their priests and diviners to avoid further humiliation (verses 1–9). Two issues were raised in verse 3:

1. What was the appropriate offering to accompany the ark?
2. Was it really YHWH who had humiliated them?

The answer for the first concern is to send gifts (cf. Exodus 3:21) on the basis of value ('gold'), corresponding to the victims ('five' for the five lords of the Philistines) and representing the plagues ('tumors' and 'mice'). The gifts are called 'guilt offering (ʼašām), serving a double function: as a sacrifice to ensure that YHWH would 'lighten his hand' and as a compensatory tribute to YHWH. They learned from the Exodus tradition 'not to be obstinate and prevent the return of the ark' (verse 6).

The answer to the second concern was sought by the use of divination (verses 7–9), utilizing untrained cows, separated from their young calves (therefore inclined to return home), and released unguided, so when the cows went straight to the territory of Israel (in the direction of border city Beth-shemesh; verses 10–18), the Philistines were convinced that the plagues came from YHWH and their gifts were acceptable (verses 16–18). The Israelites celebrated the return of the ark, and utilized the cows to be an appropriate sacrifice for the removal of ritual 'contamination', as the animals and the cart were new, unused, and therefore ritually clean (cf. Numbers 19:2). The sacrifice was performed on a 'large stone of Abel' in the field of an unknown Joshua (verse 18), which afterward also became the resting place for the ark (verse 15).

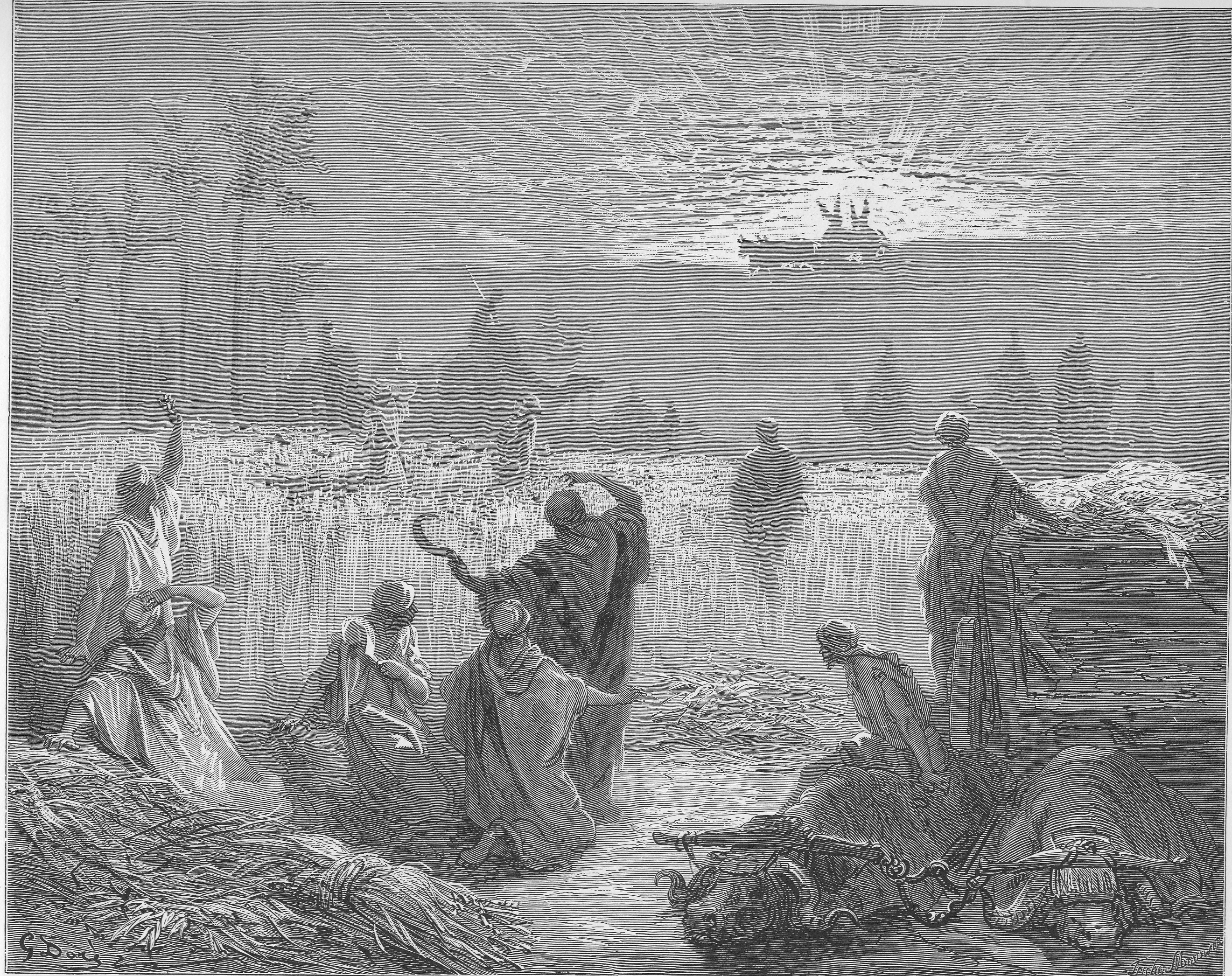
"The Ark is returned to Beth-shemesh" (1 Samuel 6:1-16). Doré's English Bible. 1866

=== Verse 1 ===
And the ark of the Lord was in the country of the Philistines seven months.

- "In the country": or "in the field" denoting a place outside 'under the open air', because apparently none of the Philistine cities dared to host the ark and the people thought it would deliver them from their calamity. However, Targum states "in the cities of the Philistines", that is, from one city to the other.
- "Philistines": a group of people coming from the northeastern Mediterranean area (which includes the island of Crete; cf. Amos 9:7) and entering "Palestine" (which is derived from "Philistine") around 1200 BCE.
- "Seven months": the ark was returned during the wheat harvest (1 Samuel 6:13), so the battles between Israel and the Philistines which led to the capture of the ark happened at the end of autumn or the beginning of winter. Josephus states that the ark was with the Philistines four months only.

=== Verse 5 ===
Therefore you will make images of your tumors and images of your mice that ravage the land. And you will give glory to the God of Israel. Perhaps He will lighten His hand from off you, even from off your gods and from off your land.

- "Tumors" (KJV: emerods): or "bleeding piles", or more probably "boils". The mention of "mice" together with "tumors" indicates that the outbreak (cf. 1 Samuel 5:6) could be bubonic plague.

== The Ark at Kirjath Jearim (6:20–21) ==
Similar to what happened to the Philistines, the ark caused plagues for Israelites when they did not show due respect to it, so the ark was moved from Beth-shemesh to Kiriath Jearim ("city of the forests"), probably due to its previous connection with Baal-worship (cf. 'city of Baal', Joshua 18:14, and 'Baalah', Joshua 15:9, 10). The custodian of the city was Eleazar, son of Abinadab, both had names that often appear in levitical lists.

=== Verse 21 ===
And they sent messengers to the inhabitants of Kiriath Jearim, saying, "The Philistines have brought back the ark of the LORD. Come down, and take it up to you."

- "Kiriath Jearim": now identified with Deir el-Azar (Tel Qiryat Yearim), a place near Abu Ghosh on a hill about 7 miles west of Jerusalem.

== See also ==
- Ark of the Covenant
- Ashdod
- Askelon
- Beth Shemesh
- Cattle
- Divination
- Ekron
- Gaza
- Gath
- Joshua the Bethshemite
- Korban
- Philistines
- Philistine captivity of the Ark
- Plagues of Egypt
- Related Bible parts: 1 Samuel 4, 1 Samuel 5

== Sources ==
=== Commentaries on Samuel ===
- Auld, Graeme (2003). "1 & 2 Samuel". In James D. G. Dunn and John William Rogerson (ed.). Eerdmans Commentary on the Bible. Eerdmans. ISBN 9780802837110.
- Bergen, David T. (1996). 1, 2 Samuel. B&H Publishing Group. ISBN 9780805401073.
- Chapman, Stephen B. (2016). 1 Samuel as Christian Scripture: A Theological Commentary. Wm. B. Eerdmans Publishing Company. ISBN 978-1467445160.
- Evans, Paul (2018). Longman, Tremper (ed.). 1-2 Samuel. The Story of God Bible Commentary. Zondervan Academic. ISBN 978-0310490944.
- Gordon, Robert (1986). I & II Samuel, A Commentary. Paternoster Press. ISBN 9780310230229.
- Hertzberg, Hans Wilhelm (1964). I & II Samuel, A Commentary (trans. from German 2nd edition 1960 ed.). Westminster John Knox Press. p. 19. ISBN 978-0664223182.
- Tsumura, David Toshio (2007). The First Book of Samuel. Eerdmans. ISBN 9780802823595.

=== General ===
- Breytenbach, Andries (2000). "Who Is Behind The Samuel Narrative?". In Johannes Cornelis de Moor and H.F. Van Rooy (ed.). Past, Present, Future: the Deuteronomistic History and the Prophets. Brill. ISBN 9789004118713.
- Coogan, Michael David (2007). Coogan, Michael David; Brettler, Marc Zvi; Newsom, Carol Ann; Perkins, Pheme (eds.). The New Oxford Annotated Bible with the Apocryphal/Deuterocanonical Books: New Revised Standard Version, Issue 48 (Augmented 3rd ed.). Oxford University Press. ISBN 978-0195288810.
- Fitzmyer, Joseph A. (2008). A Guide to the Dead Sea Scrolls and Related Literature. Grand Rapids, MI: William B. Eerdmans Publishing Company. ISBN 9780802862419.
- Halley, Henry H. (1965). Halley's Bible Handbook: an abbreviated Bible commentary (24th (revised) ed.). Zondervan Publishing House. ISBN 0-310-25720-4.
- Hayes, Christine (2015). Introduction to the Bible. Yale University Press. ISBN 978-0300188271.
- Jones, Gwilym H. (2007). "12. 1 and 2 Samuel". In Barton, John; Muddiman, John (eds.). The Oxford Bible Commentary (first (paperback) ed.). Oxford University Press. pp. 196–232. ISBN 978-0199277186.
- Klein, R.W. (2003). "Samuel, books of". In Bromiley, Geoffrey W (ed.). The International Standard Bible Encyclopedia. Eerdmans. ISBN 9780802837844.
- Knight, Douglas A (1995). "Chapter 4 Deuteronomy and the Deuteronomists". In James Luther Mays, David L. Petersen and Kent Harold Richards (ed.). Old Testament Interpretation. T&T Clark. ISBN 9780567292896.
- Ulrich, Eugene, ed. (2010). The Biblical Qumran Scrolls: Transcriptions and Textual Variants. Brill.
- Würthwein, Ernst (1995). The Text of the Old Testament. Translated by Rhodes, Erroll F. Grand Rapids, MI: Wm. B. Eerdmans. ISBN 0-8028-0788-7.
