= 1 Samuel 5 =

First Book of Samuel chapter

- ← chapter 4 chapter 6 →
- The pages containing the Books of Samuel (1 and 2 Samuel) in the Leningrad Codex (1008 CE).
- Book: First book of Samuel
- Hebrew Bible part: Nevi'im
- Order in the Hebrew part: 3
- Category: Former Prophets
- Christian Bible part: Old Testament
- Order in the Christian part: 9

1 Samuel 5 is the fifth chapter of the First Book of Samuel in the Old Testament of the Christian Bible or the first part of the Books of Samuel in the Hebrew Bible. According to Jewish tradition the book was attributed to the prophet Samuel, with additions by the prophets Gad and Nathan, but modern scholars view it as a composition of a number of independent texts of various ages from c. 630–540 BCE. This chapter describes how the Ark of Covenant was taken by the Philistines, a part of the "Ark Narrative" (1 Samuel 4:1–7:1) within a section concerning the life of Samuel (1 Samuel 1:1–7:17).

== Text ==
This chapter was originally written in the Hebrew language. It is divided into 12 verses.

=== Textual witnesses ===
Some early manuscripts containing the text of this chapter in Hebrew are of the Masoretic Text tradition, which includes the Codex Cairensis (895), Aleppo Codex (10th century), and Codex Leningradensis (1008). Fragments containing parts of this chapter in Hebrew were found among the Dead Sea Scrolls including 4Q51 (4QSam^{a}; 100–50 BCE) with extant verses 8–12.

Extant ancient manuscripts of a translation into Koine Greek known as the Septuagint (originally was made in the last few centuries BCE) include Codex Vaticanus (B; $\mathfrak{G}$^{B}; 4th century) and Codex Alexandrinus (A; $\mathfrak{G}$^{A}; 5th century). (Note: The whole book of 1 Samuel is missing from the extant Codex Sinaiticus.)

== Places ==
Places mentioned in this chapter
- Ashdod
- Ebenezer
- Ekron
- Gath

== Period ==
The events in this chapter happened at the end of judges period in Israel, about 1100 BC.

== Analysis ==
The power of Ark of the Covenant on its own was demonstrated over the Philistines by the destruction of Dagon's image (verses 1–5) as well as the sickness and death of the people in Philistine cities (verses 6–12), implying that the ark actually possesses the necessary power for the Israelites' victory, so the military defeat was with God's permission and the capture of the ark was a punishment for Israel's disrespect of it. This chapter gives prominence to 'the hand of YHWH' (verses 6, 7, 9, 11) that struck the Philistines with 'tumors', recalling the 'Exodus tradition' (Exodus 9:15–16) on the 'supremacy of YHWH over other gods'. The events refer back to 1 Samuel 2:1–10, while also providing 'a bridge between the conquest of the ark in chapter 4 and its return to Israel in chapter 6.

== The Ark in Ashdod (5:1–7) ==
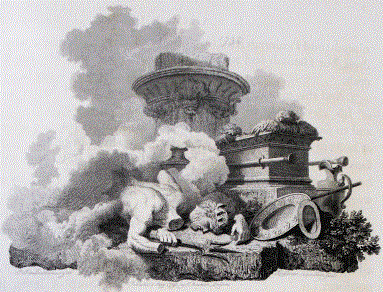
Vignette "Dagon destroyed" (1 Samuel 5:4). Head-piece to the first book of Samuel.. P. J. de Loutherbourg del, J Landseer Aqua Forti fecit. Published 1 May 1793 by T Macklin, London

In the ancient Near East it was customary to carry idols of the gods of those who had been vanquished to the temple of the victors and to place them beside the idols of their gods, indicating the latter's supremacy over the former. However, here the power of YHWH over Dagon is displayed (verses 2–5) with Dagon twice humiliated in his own temple in Ashdod: on the first day, Dagon's statue was thrown down in front of the ark, and on the second day, the statue's head and hands were cut off and were lying on the threshold (introducing an aetiological motif to explain why Ashdodites did not tread on the threshold of their temple).

=== Verse 1 ===
And the Philistines took the ark of God, and brought it from Ebenezer unto Ashdod.

- "Philistines": a group of people coming from the northeastern Mediterranean area (which includes the island of Crete; cf. Amos 9:7) and entering "Palestine" (which is derived from "Philistine") around 1200 BCE.
- "Ebenezer": literally, "the stone, the help", where 'the second noun is in apposition to the first one'; apparently forming the name by which the stone was known. The expression is used here and in 1 Samuel 7:12, but unlike in 1 Samuel 4:1, the first word lacks the definite article.
- "Ashdod": (Greek: "Azotus", Acts 8:40; now "Es-dûd"), one of the five major cities of the Philistines, situated on near the sea, about 35 miles (56 km) west of Jerusalem, 12 miles (19 km) north of Ashkelon. It was assigned to Judah (Joshua 15:47), but was only conquered in the reign of Uzziah (2 Chronicles 26:6). Jonathan Maccabaeus destroyed the city (1 Maccabee 10:84), but it was rebuilt after the Roman conquest of Judea.

=== Verse 2 ===
When the Philistines took the ark of God, they brought it into the house of Dagon, and set it by Dagon.

- "Dagon": a Philistine idol, also a Semitic deity, identified in Ugaritic texts as the father of Baal.

=== Verse 6 ===
But the hand of the Lord was heavy on the people of Ashdod, and He ravaged them and struck them with tumors, both Ashdod and its territory.

- "Tumors" (KJV: emerods): or "bleeding piles", or more probably "boils". The mention of "mice" in the next chapter together with "tumors" indicates that this outbreak could be bubonic plague.

Greek Septuagint and Latin Vulgate contain an addition "And in the midst of their land rats sprang up, and there was a great death panic in the city."

== The Ark in Gath (5:8–9) ==
Gath may have been chosen to host the ark, because there was no temple of Dagon there, as 'the Philistines attributing the plague to the antagonism between YHWH and Dagon'.

=== Verse 8 ===
So they sent and gathered all the lords of the Philistines unto them, and said, “What shall we do with the ark of the God of Israel?”
And they answered, “Let the ark of the God of Israel be carried around to Gath.” And they carried the ark of the God of Israel there.''

- "Lords": from Philistine plural word סַרְנֵ֨י, sar-nê; the singular form "seren" is cognate with the Greek word "tyrannos" (English: "tyrant").
- "Gath": now called "Tell-es-Sâfi", 12 miles (19 km) east of Ashdod, located at the foot of the mountains of Judah. It was the hometown of Goliath (1 Samuel 17:4), and where David took refuge from the persecutions of Saul (1 Samuel 21:10, 1 Samuel 27:3).

== The Ark in Ekron (5:10–12) ==
The description of the plagues inflicted on Ekron seems to indicate a greater severity than those on Ashdod and Gath. The underlying message could be that the longer the Philistines retained the ark, the harder the punishment from the God of Israel would be.

=== Verse 10 ===
Therefore they sent the ark of God to Ekron.
And it came about that as the ark of God came to Ekron, that the Ekronites cried out, saying, “They have brought about the ark of the God of Israel to slay us and our people.”

- "Ekron": now "Tel Miqne" (Hebrew) or "Khirbet el-Muqanna" (Arabic), the most northerly of the five major Philistine cities, about 11 miles (18 km) north of Gath, 22 miles (35 km) west of Jerusalem. It was allotted to the tribe of Judah (Joshua 15:45-46), and was occupied for a short period by the Israelites (Judges 1:18).
- "To slay us and our people": in Hebrew literally "to me, to slay my people" (also in 1 Samuel 5:11); the singular form seems to denote the 'lord' of the city acting as a spokesperson.

== See also ==
- Philistine captivity of the Ark
- Related Bible parts: 1 Samuel 4, 1 Samuel 6

== Sources ==
=== Commentaries on Samuel ===
- Auld, Graeme (2003). "1 & 2 Samuel". In James D. G. Dunn and John William Rogerson (ed.). Eerdmans Commentary on the Bible. Eerdmans. ISBN 9780802837110.
- Bergen, David T. (1996). 1, 2 Samuel. B&H Publishing Group. ISBN 9780805401073.
- Chapman, Stephen B. (2016). 1 Samuel as Christian Scripture: A Theological Commentary. Wm. B. Eerdmans Publishing Company. ISBN 978-1467445160.
- Evans, Paul (2018). Longman, Tremper (ed.). 1-2 Samuel. The Story of God Bible Commentary. Zondervan Academic. ISBN 978-0310490944.
- Gordon, Robert (1986). I & II Samuel, A Commentary. Paternoster Press. ISBN 9780310230229.
- Hertzberg, Hans Wilhelm (1964). I & II Samuel, A Commentary (trans. from German 2nd edition 1960 ed.). Westminster John Knox Press. p. 19. ISBN 978-0664223182.
- Tsumura, David Toshio (2007). The First Book of Samuel. Eerdmans. ISBN 9780802823595.

=== General ===
- Breytenbach, Andries (2000). "Who Is Behind The Samuel Narrative?". In Johannes Cornelis de Moor and H.F. Van Rooy (ed.). Past, Present, Future: the Deuteronomistic History and the Prophets. Brill. ISBN 9789004118713.
- Coogan, Michael David (2007). Coogan, Michael David; Brettler, Marc Zvi; Newsom, Carol Ann; Perkins, Pheme (eds.). The New Oxford Annotated Bible with the Apocryphal/Deuterocanonical Books: New Revised Standard Version, Issue 48 (Augmented 3rd ed.). Oxford University Press. ISBN 978-0195288810.
- Fitzmyer, Joseph A. (2008). A Guide to the Dead Sea Scrolls and Related Literature. Grand Rapids, MI: William B. Eerdmans Publishing Company. ISBN 9780802862419.
- Halley, Henry H. (1965). Halley's Bible Handbook: an abbreviated Bible commentary (24th (revised) ed.). Zondervan Publishing House. ISBN 0-310-25720-4.
- Hayes, Christine (2015). Introduction to the Bible. Yale University Press. ISBN 978-0300188271.
- Jones, Gwilym H. (2007). "12. 1 and 2 Samuel". In Barton, John; Muddiman, John (eds.). The Oxford Bible Commentary (first (paperback) ed.). Oxford University Press. pp. 196–232. ISBN 978-0199277186.
- Klein, R.W. (2003). "Samuel, books of". In Bromiley, Geoffrey W (ed.). The International Standard Bible Encyclopedia. Eerdmans. ISBN 9780802837844.
- Knight, Douglas A (1995). "Chapter 4 Deuteronomy and the Deuteronomists". In James Luther Mays, David L. Petersen and Kent Harold Richards (ed.). Old Testament Interpretation. T&T Clark. ISBN 9780567292896.
- Ulrich, Eugene, ed. (2010). The Biblical Qumran Scrolls: Transcriptions and Textual Variants. Brill.
- Würthwein, Ernst (1995). The Text of the Old Testament. Translated by Rhodes, Erroll F. Grand Rapids, MI: Wm. B. Eerdmans. ISBN 0-8028-0788-7.
