= 1 Samuel 4 =

First Book of Samuel chapter

- ← chapter 3 chapter 5 →
- The pages containing the Books of Samuel (1 & 2 Samuel) in Leningrad Codex (1008 CE).
- Book: First book of Samuel
- Hebrew Bible part: Nevi'im
- Order in the Hebrew part: 3
- Category: Former Prophets
- Christian Bible part: Old Testament
- Order in the Christian part: 9

1 Samuel 4 is the fourth chapter of the First Book of Samuel in the Old Testament of the Christian Bible or the first part of the Books of Samuel in the Hebrew Bible. According to Jewish tradition the book was attributed to the prophet Samuel, with additions by the prophets Gad and Nathan, but modern scholars view it as a composition of a number of independent texts of various ages from c. 630–540 BCE. This chapter describes how the Ark of Covenant was taken by the Philistines, a part of the "Ark Narrative" (1 Samuel 4:1–7:1) within a section concerning the life of Samuel (1 Samuel 1:1–7:17).

== Text ==
This chapter was originally written in the Hebrew language. It is divided into 22 verses.

=== Textual witnesses ===
Some early manuscripts containing the text of this chapter in Hebrew are of the Masoretic Text tradition, which includes the Codex Cairensis (895), Aleppo Codex (10th century), and Codex Leningradensis (1008). Fragments containing parts of this chapter in Hebrew were found among the Dead Sea Scrolls including 4Q51 (4QSam^{a}; 100–50 BCE) with extant verses 3–4, 9–10, 12.

Extant ancient manuscripts of a translation into Koine Greek known as the Septuagint (originally was made in the last few centuries BCE) include Codex Vaticanus (B; $\mathfrak{G}$^{B}; 4th century) and Codex Alexandrinus (A; $\mathfrak{G}$^{A}; 5th century). (Note: The whole book of 1 Samuel is missing from the extant Codex Sinaiticus.)

== Places ==
Places mentioned in this chapter
- Aphek
- Ebenezer
- Shiloh

== Period ==
- The event in this chapter happened at the end of judges period in Israel, about 1100 BC.

== Analysis ==
In the beginning of this chapter, Samuel was no longer a boy, as he had grown into a powerful prophet whose words were fulfilled and with Shiloh stripped of its pre-eminence, Samuel was no longer associated with that town.

Verses 4:1b to 7:1 forms the so-called "the Ark Narrative", because of their distinctive vocabulary, focusing mainly on the Ark of the Covenant, while Samuel disappeared from the scene, and Shiloh's influence diminished. The historical setting suggests the tenth century BCE as the composition date of this narrative, with the main argument that 'an account of the previous misfortunes of the ark would be unnecessary and irrelevant once David was on his way to be king in Jerusalem'.

== The Philistines capture the Ark (4:1–10) ==
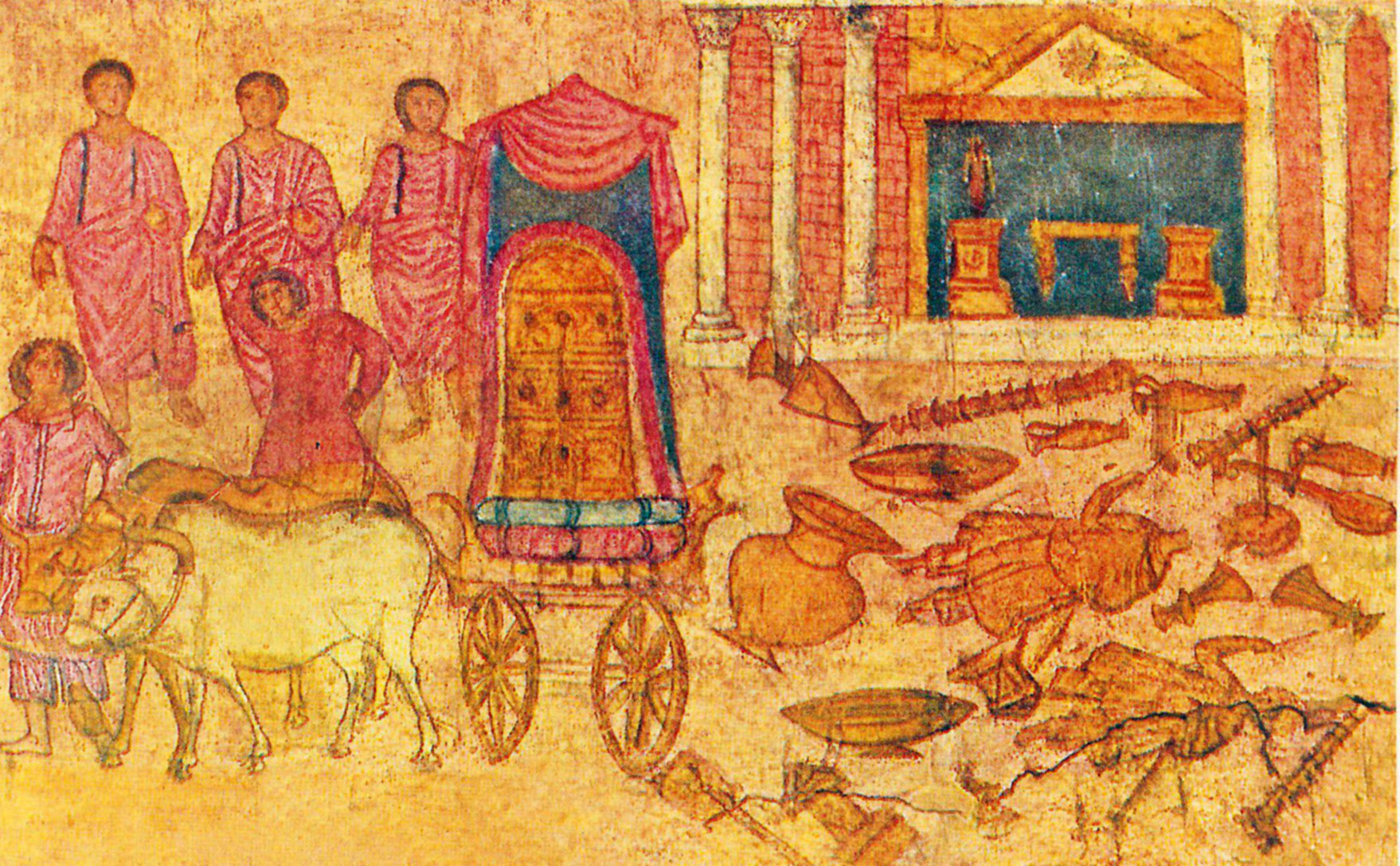
Fresco of the Philistine captivity of the ark, in the Dura-Europos synagogue.

The position of the two camps at Ebenezer and Aphek in the southern end of the plain of Sharon indicates the intention of the Philistines to gain land further north from their current territories, whereas the Israelites had the intention to move westwards. Israel was defeated twice: the first occasion was attributed to God's decision 'to put us to rout today' (verse 3), and on the second occasion happened despite the presence of the Ark of the Covenant in battle (verse 7). The importance of the ark in Israel's battles is known from several passages such as Numbers 10:35–36 and 2 Samuel 11:11, being a visible sign of God's presence. The loss of Israel and the capture of the ark by the Philistines was attributed in verse 11 (recalling 1 Samuel 2:34) to 'the degenerate priesthood of Shiloh'. The Philistines regarded the Israelites as worshippers of several gods (verses 7–8) and they were aware of the Exodus tradition.

=== Verse 1 ===
And the word of Samuel came to all Israel.
And Israel went out to battle against the Philistines and they made camp beside Ebenezer, and the Philistines encamped in Aphek.

Before the words "and Israel", LXX (Septuagint) and Vulgate have the statements: "And it came to pass in those days that the Philistines gathered themselves together to fight" (LXX adds further "against Israel"); this addition is not found in the Masoretic Text and Targum.

- "Ebenezer": literally, "the stone, the help", where 'the second noun is in apposition to the first one'; apparently forming the name by which the stone was known; cf. the expression used in 1 Samuel 5:1 and 7:12, where, unlike 4:1, the first word lacks the definite article.
- "Philistines": a group of people coming from the northeastern Mediterranean area (which includes the island of Crete; cf. Amos 9:7) and entering "Palestine" (which is derived from "Philistine") around 1200 BCE.

== Death of Eli (4:11–22) ==
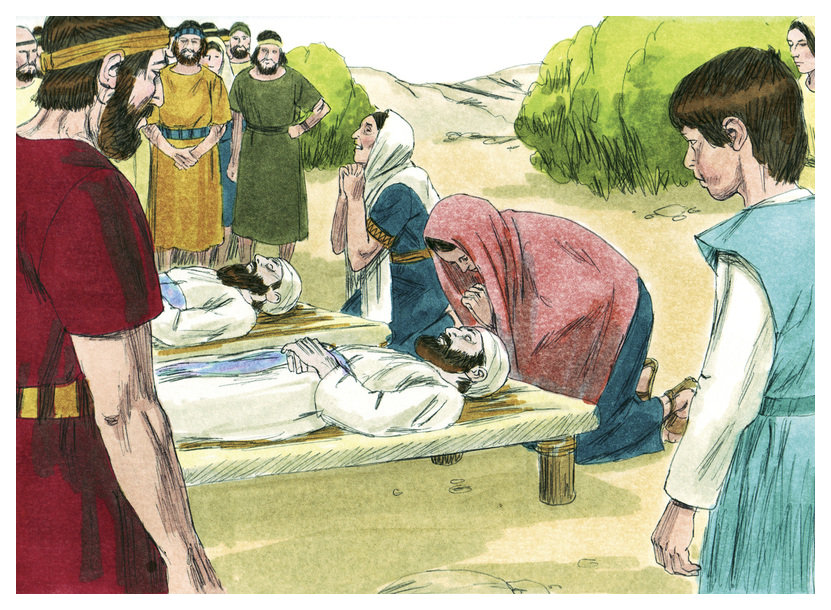
"Eli's two sons, Hophni and Phinehas, are both dead". Bible Illustrations by Jim Padgett, Sweet Publishing, 1984

News of Israel's defeat was brought to Eli (verses 12–17), who was 'more concerned about the ark than anything else' (verse 13). The loss of the ark caused a triad of calamities for Eli and his family as Eli fell to his death (verses 17–18), Phinehas's wife gave premature birth and this led to her untimely death (verse 19). The naming of her son, Ichabod ('where is glory?' or 'alas (for) glory'), and her death-cry 'both allude to the loss of the ark'.

=== Verse 18 ===
Then it happened, when he made mention of the ark of God, that Eli fell off the seat backward by the side of the gate; and his neck was broken and he died, for the man was old and heavy. And he had judged Israel forty years.

- "The side of the gate": A comparison with 2 Samuel 18:4 explains exactly the position of Eli's seat (or "throne"), which was without a back, but with the side against the jamb of the gate, leaving the passage clear but ensuring that every one passing through the gate must pass in front of him.

== See also ==
- Eli
- Hophni and Phinehas
- Phinehas's wife
- Plagues of Egypt
- The Exodus
- Related Bible parts: 1 Samuel 2, 1 Samuel 3, 1 Samuel 5

== Sources ==
=== Commentaries on Samuel ===
- Auld, Graeme (2003). "1 & 2 Samuel". In James D. G. Dunn and John William Rogerson (ed.). Eerdmans Commentary on the Bible. Eerdmans. ISBN 9780802837110.
- Bergen, David T. (1996). 1, 2 Samuel. B&H Publishing Group. ISBN 9780805401073.
- Chapman, Stephen B. (2016). 1 Samuel as Christian Scripture: A Theological Commentary. Wm. B. Eerdmans Publishing Company. ISBN 978-1467445160.
- Evans, Paul (2018). Longman, Tremper (ed.). 1-2 Samuel. The Story of God Bible Commentary. Zondervan Academic. ISBN 978-0310490944.
- Gordon, Robert (1986). I & II Samuel, A Commentary. Paternoster Press. ISBN 9780310230229.
- Hertzberg, Hans Wilhelm (1964). I & II Samuel, A Commentary (trans. from German 2nd edition 1960 ed.). Westminster John Knox Press. p. 19. ISBN 978-0664223182.
- Tsumura, David Toshio (2007). The First Book of Samuel. Eerdmans. ISBN 9780802823595.

=== General ===
- Breytenbach, Andries (2000). "Who Is Behind The Samuel Narrative?". In Johannes Cornelis de Moor and H.F. Van Rooy (ed.). Past, Present, Future: the Deuteronomistic History and the Prophets. Brill. ISBN 9789004118713.
- Coogan, Michael David (2007). Coogan, Michael David; Brettler, Marc Zvi; Newsom, Carol Ann; Perkins, Pheme (eds.). The New Oxford Annotated Bible with the Apocryphal/Deuterocanonical Books: New Revised Standard Version, Issue 48 (Augmented 3rd ed.). Oxford University Press. ISBN 978-0195288810.
- Fitzmyer, Joseph A. (2008). A Guide to the Dead Sea Scrolls and Related Literature. Grand Rapids, MI: William B. Eerdmans Publishing Company. ISBN 9780802862419.
- Halley, Henry H. (1965). Halley's Bible Handbook: an abbreviated Bible commentary (24th (revised) ed.). Zondervan Publishing House. ISBN 0-310-25720-4.
- Hayes, Christine (2015). Introduction to the Bible. Yale University Press. ISBN 978-0300188271.
- Jones, Gwilym H. (2007). "12. 1 and 2 Samuel". In Barton, John; Muddiman, John (eds.). The Oxford Bible Commentary (first (paperback) ed.). Oxford University Press. pp. 196–232. ISBN 978-0199277186.
- Klein, R.W. (2003). "Samuel, books of". In Bromiley, Geoffrey W (ed.). The International Standard Bible Encyclopedia. Eerdmans. ISBN 9780802837844.
- Knight, Douglas A (1995). "Chapter 4 Deuteronomy and the Deuteronomists". In James Luther Mays, David L. Petersen and Kent Harold Richards (ed.). Old Testament Interpretation. T&T Clark. ISBN 9780567292896.
- Ulrich, Eugene, ed. (2010). The Biblical Qumran Scrolls: Transcriptions and Textual Variants. Brill.
- Würthwein, Ernst (1995). The Text of the Old Testament. Translated by Rhodes, Erroll F. Grand Rapids, MI: Wm. B. Eerdmans. ISBN 0-8028-0788-7.
