= 1 Samuel 7 =

First Book of Samuel chapter

- ← chapter 6 chapter 8 →
- The pages containing the Books of Samuel (1 & 2 Samuel) in Leningrad Codex (1008 CE).
- Book: First book of Samuel
- Hebrew Bible part: Nevi'im
- Order in the Hebrew part: 3
- Category: Former Prophets
- Christian Bible part: Old Testament
- Order in the Christian part: 9

1 Samuel 7 is the seventh chapter of the First Book of Samuel in the Old Testament of the Christian Bible or the first part of the Books of Samuel in the Hebrew Bible. According to Jewish tradition the book was attributed to the prophet Samuel, with additions by the prophets Gad and Nathan, but modern scholars view it as a composition of a number of independent texts of various ages from c. 630–540 BCE. This chapter records a victory of Israel under the leadership of Samuel against the Philistines as part of the "Ark Narrative" (1 Samuel 4:1–7:1) within a section concerning the life of Samuel (1 Samuel 1:1–7:17), and also as part of a section comprising 1 Samuel 7–15 which records the rise of the monarchy in Israel and the account of the first years of King Saul.

== Text ==
This chapter was originally written in the Hebrew language. It is divided into 17 verses.

=== Textual witnesses ===
Some early manuscripts containing the text of this chapter in Hebrew are of the Masoretic Text tradition, which includes the Codex Cairensis (895), Aleppo Codex (10th century), and Codex Leningradensis (1008). Fragments containing parts of this chapter in Hebrew were found among the Dead Sea Scrolls, including 4Q51 (4QSam^{a}; 100–50 BCE) with extant verse 1.

Extant ancient manuscripts of a translation into Koine Greek known as the Septuagint (originally made in the last few centuries BCE) include Codex Vaticanus (B; $\mathfrak{G}$^{B}; 4th century) and Codex Alexandrinus (A; $\mathfrak{G}$^{A}; 5th century). (Note: The whole book of 1 Samuel is missing from the extant Codex Sinaiticus.)

== Places ==
Places mentioned in this chapter
- Bethel
- Ekron
- Gath
- Gilgal
- Kiriath Jearim
- Mizpah
- Ramah

== Period ==
- The event in this chapter happened at the end of judges period in Israel, about 1100 BC.

== Analysis ==
This chapter provides the background leading to the rise of the monarchy in chapters 8–12 by indicating the threat to Israel, here from the Philistines (cf. 9:16), and later also from other nations (11:1–15), as well as showing that theocracy, based on Israel's faithfulness to the covenant with God, brought success against the enemies, but later when Israel became unfaithful to God, a monarchy became a necessity.

== The Ark at Kiriath Jearim (7:1–2) ==
At the request of the people of Beth-shemesh (1 Samuel 6:21), men of Kiriath Jearim moved the Ark of the Covenant from Beth-shemesh to their city and installed it at the house of Abinadab. The people set aside Eleazar, son of Abinadab, as the guard (Hebrew: shmr) to the Ark, a term which may mean a priestly task of liturgical services to take care of it as a sacred object or the actual task of keeping people away from it (preventing curious peeking as in Beth-shemesh, that caused plagues there). Both the names Abinadab and Eleazar often appear in levitical lists. Eleazar seemed to perform his duties well as there was no reported casualties during the twenty years of the Ark being there. The Ark stayed in Kiriath Jearim until David moved it to Jerusalem (2 Samuel 6).

=== Verse 1 ===
Then the people of Kiriath Jearim came and took the ark of the Lord; they brought it to the house of Abinadab located on the hill. They consecrated Eleazar his son to guard the ark of the Lord.

- "People": in Hebrew literally "men".
- "Kiriath Jearim" (also written as "Kirjath-Jearim" or "Kiryat Ye'arim"): now identified with Deir el-Azar (Tel Qiryat Yearim), a place near Abu Ghosh on a hill about 7 miles west of Jerusalem.
- "Abinadab": also the father of Uzzah and Ahio, the priests related to the transportation of the Ark to Jerusalem, as recorded in 2 Samuel 6:3–4, 6–8; 1 Chronicles 13:7, 9–11.

=== Verse 2 ===
And it came to pass, while the ark abode in Kirjathjearim, that the time was long; for it was twenty years: and all the house of Israel lamented after the Lord.

- "Twenty years": may allude to "half a generation", fitting Samuel's story in the Book of Judges, where 'a period of foreign oppression precedes Israel's repentance'.

== Rematch with the Philistines (7:3–14) ==
Although the Philistines had been forced to return the ark, they were still a threat, so Samuel surfaced to lead his people to fight, first by addressing the issue in verse 3, then by assembling the army in verse 5. The battle in verses 7–11 'bears the marks of the holy war tradition', such as in Joshua 10:

- an enemy assault causing panic among the Israelites;
- petition by Samuel, accompanied by sacrifice;
- YHWH entering into battle, causing a thunderstorm to confuse the Philistines;
- the Israelites pursuing the defeated Philistines.

These elements emphasize the basic claim that 'victory belongs to YHWH alone'. Using a formula similar to those in the book of Judges (cf. Judges 4:23–24), the section concludes by stating that the Philistines were completely subjugated with Israel repossessing towns and territories formerly lost to the Philistines (near Ekron and Gath), restoring their position, as it was before an earlier battle at Ebenezer (chapter 4), a place with significant meaning, 'Stone of Help', reminding Israel that 'thus far the LORD has helped us'. The Israelites even made peace with the Amorites.

=== Verse 3 ===
And Samuel said to all the house of Israel, "If you are returning to the LORD with all your heart, then put away the foreign gods and the Ashtaroth from among you and direct your heart to the LORD and serve him only, and he will deliver you out of the hand of the Philistines."

Samuel's address contains Deuteronomistic phrases, such as 'returning to the LORD with all your heart', and many expressions found in the book of Judges (cf. Judges 10:6–16 for 'remove foreign gods', 'serve him only', 'the Baals and Astartes').

=== Verse 5 ===
And Samuel said, "Gather all Israel to Mizpah, and I will pray to the Lord for you."

- "Mizpah": identified as Tell en-Nasbeh a few miles north of Jerusalem. It was an important tribal center and location of many prophetical activities.
- "Pray": on this occasion was usually accompanied by two rites: (1) drawing and pouring water (water as the source of life, probably, in association with the Feast of Tabernacles and the Day of Atonement, as an essential element for a purification rite); (2) fasting was a sign of penitence.

=== Verse 12 ===
Then Samuel took a stone and set it between Mizpah and Shen. And he called its name Ebenezer saying, "Thus far the Lord has helped us."

- "Shen": according to Hebrew texts; Septuagint and Syriac manuscripts have "Jeshanah".
- "Ebenezer": literally, "stone of help" or "the stone, the help", where 'the second noun is in apposition to the first one'; apparently forming the name by which the stone was known; cf. the expression used in 1 Samuel 5:1 and 7:12, where, unlike 4:1, the first word lacks the definite article.

=== Verse 13 ===
So the Philistines were subdued, and they came no more into the coast of Israel: and the hand of the Lord was against the Philistines all the days of Samuel.

- "All the days of Samuel": this phrase indicates that the statement summarizes Samuel's judgeship. This directly contrasts with the characterization of the reign of Saul in 1 Samuel 14:52, as follows:

1 Samuel 7:13	1 Samuel 14:52
"all the days of Samuel"	"all the days of Saul"
"the hand of the LORD was against the Philistines"	"there was bitter war with the Philistines"

The contrast displays the ineffectiveness of Saul's reign against the Philistines, but moreover shows how the people of Israel demanded a king during the time of military dominance over the Philistines under Samuel, thus lack of valid reason to replace theocracy with monarchy.

== Samuel judges Israel (7:15–17) ==
Samuel the prophet led Israel in the style of preceding "judges", who saved the people from their enemies (Judges 2:18), while also fulfilling a narrower judicial role (verses 15–17). In affirming the effectiveness of a charismatic, non-royal leadership, the inappropriateness of Israel's wish to have a king in subsequent events is established.

== See also ==
- Amorites
- Ark of the Covenant
- Ashtaroth
- Baalim
- Bethcar
- Domestic sheep
- Ekron
- Fasting
- Gaza
- Gath
- Joshua the Bethshemite
- Korban
- Philistines
- Philistine captivity of the Ark
- Shen
- Related Bible parts: 1 Samuel 4, 1 Samuel 5, 1 Samuel 6

== Sources ==
=== Commentaries on Samuel ===
- Auld, Graeme (2003). "1 & 2 Samuel". In James D. G. Dunn and John William Rogerson (ed.). Eerdmans Commentary on the Bible. Eerdmans. ISBN 978-0-8028-3711-0.
- Bergen, David T. (1996). 1, 2 Samuel. B&H Publishing Group. ISBN 978-0-8054-0107-3.
- Chapman, Stephen B. (2016). 1 Samuel as Christian Scripture: A Theological Commentary. Wm. B. Eerdmans Publishing Company. ISBN 978-1-4674-4516-0.
- Evans, Paul (2018). Longman, Tremper (ed.). 1-2 Samuel. The Story of God Bible Commentary. Zondervan Academic. ISBN 978-0-310-49094-4.
- Gordon, Robert (1986). I & II Samuel, A Commentary. Paternoster Press. ISBN 978-0-310-23022-9.
- Hertzberg, Hans Wilhelm (1964). I & II Samuel, A Commentary (trans. from German 2nd edition 1960 ed.). Westminster John Knox Press. p. 19. ISBN 978-0-664-22318-2.
- Tsumura, David Toshio (2007). The First Book of Samuel. Eerdmans. ISBN 978-0-8028-2359-5.

=== General ===
- Breytenbach, Andries (2000). "Who Is Behind The Samuel Narrative?". In Johannes Cornelis de Moor and H.F. Van Rooy (ed.). Past, Present, Future: the Deuteronomistic History and the Prophets. Brill. ISBN 9789004118713.
- Coogan, Michael David (2007). Coogan, Michael David; Brettler, Marc Zvi; Newsom, Carol Ann; Perkins, Pheme (eds.). The New Oxford Annotated Bible with the Apocryphal/Deuterocanonical Books: New Revised Standard Version, Issue 48 (Augmented 3rd ed.). Oxford University Press. ISBN 978-0-19-528881-0.
- Fitzmyer, Joseph A. (2008). A Guide to the Dead Sea Scrolls and Related Literature. Grand Rapids, MI: William B. Eerdmans Publishing Company. ISBN 978-0-8028-6241-9.
- Halley, Henry H. (1965). Halley's Bible Handbook: an abbreviated Bible commentary (24th (revised) ed.). Zondervan Publishing House. ISBN 0-310-25720-4.
- Hayes, Christine (2015). Introduction to the Bible. Yale University Press. ISBN 978-0-300-18827-1.
- Jones, Gwilym H. (2007). "12. 1 and 2 Samuel". In Barton, John; Muddiman, John (eds.). The Oxford Bible Commentary (first (paperback) ed.). Oxford University Press. pp. 196–232. ISBN 978-0-19-927718-6.
- Klein, R.W. (2003). "Samuel, books of". In Bromiley, Geoffrey W (ed.). The International Standard Bible Encyclopedia. Eerdmans. ISBN 978-0-8028-3784-4.
- Knight, Douglas A (1995). "Chapter 4 Deuteronomy and the Deuteronomists". In James Luther Mays, David L. Petersen and Kent Harold Richards (ed.). Old Testament Interpretation. T&T Clark. ISBN 978-0-567-29289-6.
- Ulrich, Eugene, ed. (2010). The Biblical Qumran Scrolls: Transcriptions and Textual Variants. Brill.
- Würthwein, Ernst (1995). The Text of the Old Testament. Translated by Rhodes, Erroll F. Grand Rapids, MI: Wm. B. Eerdmans. ISBN 0-8028-0788-7.
