= Joshua 9 =

Book of Joshua, chapter 9

- ← chapter 8 chapter 10 →
- The pages containing the Book of Joshua in Leningrad Codex (AD 1008).
- Book: Book of Joshua
- Hebrew Bible part: Nevi'im
- Order in the Hebrew part: 1
- Category: Former Prophets
- Christian Bible part: Old Testament
- Order in the Christian part: 6

Joshua 9 is the ninth chapter of the Book of Joshua in the Bible. According to Jewish tradition the book was attributed to Joshua, with additions by the high priests Eleazar and Phinehas, but modern scholars view it as part of the Deuteronomistic History, which spans the books of Deuteronomy to 2 Kings. This chapter focuses on the deception by the people of Gibeon to avoid annihilation by having a treaty with the people of Israel under the leadership of Joshua, a part of a section comprising Joshua 5:13–12:24 about the conquest of Canaan.

== Text ==
This chapter was originally written in the Hebrew language. It is divided into 27 verses.

=== Textual witnesses ===
Some early manuscripts containing the text of this chapter in Hebrew are of the Masoretic Text tradition, which includes the Codex Cairensis (895), Aleppo Codex (10th century), and Codex Leningradensis (1008).

Extant ancient manuscripts of a translation into Koine Greek known as the Septuagint (originally was made in the last few centuries BCE) include Codex Vaticanus (B; $\mathfrak{G}$^{B}; 4th century) and Codex Alexandrinus (A; $\mathfrak{G}$^{A}; 5th century). (Note: The whole book of Joshua is missing from the extant Codex Sinaiticus.) Fragments of the Septuagint Greek text containing this chapter is found in manuscripts such as Washington Manuscript I (5th century CE), and a reduced version of the Septuagint text is found in the illustrated Joshua Roll.

== Analysis ==
The narrative of the Israelites conquering the land of Canaan comprises verses 5:13 to 12:24 of the Book of Joshua and has the following outline:

A. Jericho (5:13–6:27)
B. Achan and Ai (7:1–8:29)
C. Renewal at Mount Ebal (8:30–35)
D. The Gibeonite Deception (9:1–27)

1. Response of Canaanite Kings to Jericho and Ai (9:1-2)
2. Report of the Gibeonites' Deception (9:3-13)
3. Israel Establishes a Covenant with Gibeon (9:14-15)
4. Israel's First Response to Discovering the Deception (9:16-21)
5. The Gibeonites Explain Their Actions to Joshua (9:22-27)

E. The Campaign in the South (10:1–43)
F. The Campaign in the North and Summary List of Kings (11:1–12:24)

== Israel Establishes a Covenant with Gibeon (9:1–15) ==
The successes of Israel at Jericho and Ai caused independent kings of different nations in Canaan (Deuteronomy 1:7; 7:1; Joshua 3:10; the Girgashites are not listed here) to form an alliance in anticipation of the battle with the Israelites (verses 1–2), except for the Gibeonites, parts of the Hivites, who decided to pretend that they were from a faraway land (verse 3) and to make a peace treaty with the Israelites (verse 6). Gibeon lay to the south of Bethel and Ai, a little to the north of Jerusalem, while the Israelite camp was still at Gilgal (verse 6), near Jericho. A treaty, or 'covenant' (Hebrew: berit, the same word used for God's covenant with Israel, Exodus 24:7), was a 'universal mean of establishing relationships among peoples in the ancient Near East' (cf. Joshua 24). The Gibeonites acknowledge of Israel's successes since Egypt to the victories in Transjordan (verses 9–10), so they seek an inferior status (to be "vassal") as the price of survival. The 'leaders' (verse 14; or 'leaders of the congregation' in verse 18) of Israel, who represent Israel in an official way, conclude the treaty, eating the Gibeonites' provisions, and then Joshua makes peace with them. The narrative, however, states that the treaty was not according to the will of YHWH, because the Israelites did not consult YHWH about it.

== The responses after discovering the deception (9:16–27) ==
Cities of the Gibeonites: (1) Gibeon; (2) Chephirah; (3) Beeroth; (4) Kiriath-jearim

When the Gibeonites was revealed to be local inhabitants, the Israelites debated whether they should still implement the herem ("ban"; verse 16–21) on these people, or rather honor the oath, and the decision was for the latter, with the Gibeonites consigned to servitude, as the retribution of their deceit. The short report in verse 21 is expanded in the final paragraph (verses 22–27) with a dialogue between Joshua and the Gibeonites, in which Joshua pronounced them 'cursed' for acquiring the treaty by deceit and the Gibeonites accepted the right of the Israelites (here, of Joshua) to decide their fate. The Gibeonites was assigned to servitude at the 'place that YHWH should choose', that is, the main worship sanctuary of Israel (Deuteronomy 12:5, 14), which may refer to Shiloh (Jeremiah 7:12), a central sanctuary for Israel before Jerusalem (1 Samuel 1–3) or to city of Gibeon, as the great 'high place' at which Solomon would worship before building the temple (1 Kings 3:4), where the tent of meeting was established after Shiloh (2 Chronicles 1:3). By the time of Saul's reign, the application of the treaty was already well established, that when Saul broke the covenant by killing the Gibeonites probably to extend his territory in Benjamin, Israel suffered the consequences of a famine (2 Samuel 21).

=== Verse 17 ===
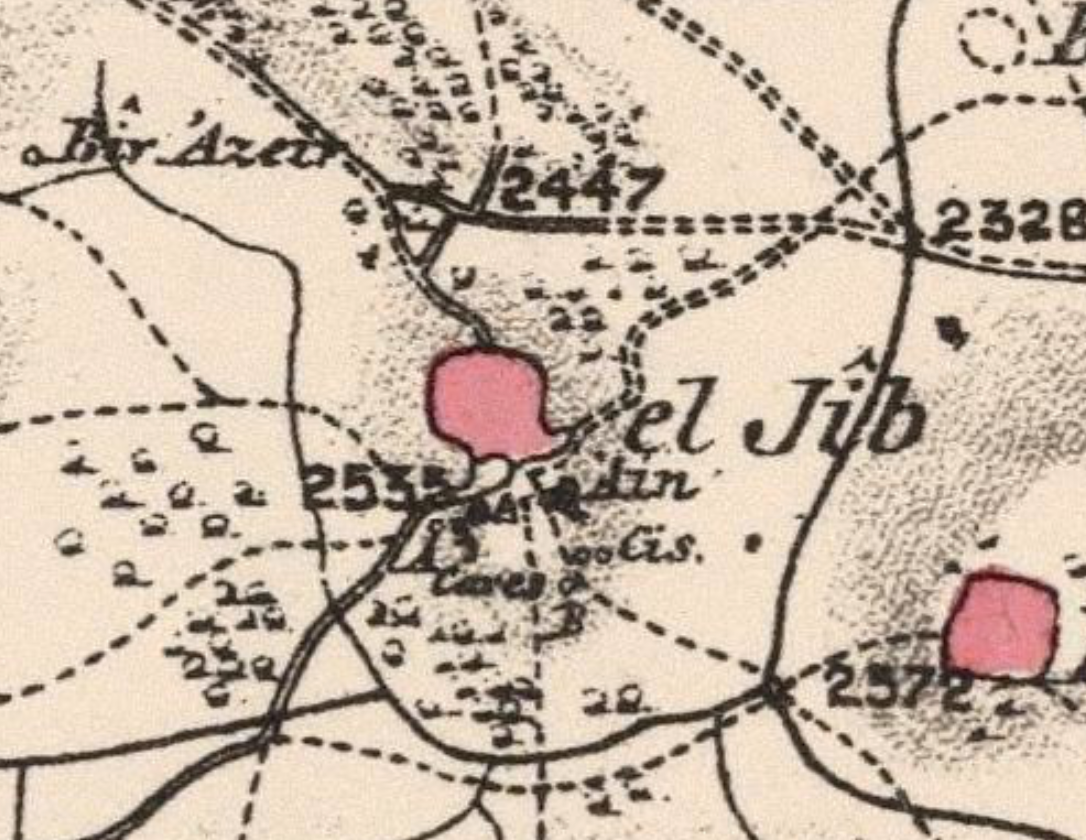
1880 map of Al Jib (ancient Gibeon).

And the people of Israel set out and reached their cities on the third day. Now their cities were Gibeon, Chephirah, Beeroth, and Kiriath-jearim.

This verse shows that the "Gibeonites" live in four towns (a "tetrapolis"). Three of the four cities, without Gibeon, appear in Ezra 2:25 and Nehemiah 7:29.

- Gibeon: is identified with "el-Jib", located in a valley basin next to the central watershed, the northern most of the four cities.
- Chephirah: is identified with "Khirbat el-Kefireh", west of Gibeon.
- Beeroth: was identified with "el-Bireh", but modern scholars believe it should be identified with Khirbet el-Burj near Beit Iksa, south of Gibeon.
- Kiriath-jearim: is identified with "Deir el-'Azar ('Azhar)", south of Chepirah, west of Gibeon, above the village of Abu Gosh.

== See also ==
- Ai
- Amorites
- Astaroth
- Bashan
- Bethel
- Blessing
- Canaanite
- Children of Israel
- Curse
- Egypt
- Heshbon
- Hittites
- Hivites
- Israelites
- Jebusite
- Jordan River
- Kohen
- Korban
- Lebanon
- Levites
- Moses
- Og
- Perizzites
- Sihon
- Torah
- Related Bible parts: Joshua 5, Joshua 8, 2 Samuel 21

== Sources ==
- Beal, Lissa M. Wray (2019). Longman, Tremper III; McKnight, Scot (eds.). Joshua. The Story of God Bible Commentary. Zondervan Academic. ISBN 978-0310490838.
- Coogan, Michael David (2007). Coogan, Michael David; Brettler, Marc Zvi; Newsom, Carol Ann; Perkins, Pheme (eds.). The New Oxford Annotated Bible with the Apocryphal/Deuterocanonical Books: New Revised Standard Version, Issue 48 (Augmented 3rd ed.). Oxford University Press. ISBN 978-0195288810.
- Firth, David G. (2021). Joshua: Evangelical Biblical Theology Commentary. Evangelical Biblical Theology Commentary (EBTC) (illustrated ed.). Lexham Press. ISBN 9781683594406.
- Halley, Henry H. (1965). Halley's Bible Handbook: an abbreviated Bible commentary (24th (revised) ed.). Zondervan Publishing House. ISBN 0-310-25720-4.
- Harstad, Adolph L. (2004). Joshua. Concordia Publishing House. ISBN 978-0570063193.
- Hayes, Christine (2015). Introduction to the Bible. Yale University Press. ISBN 978-0300188271.
- McConville, Gordon (2007). "9. Joshua". In Barton, John; Muddiman, John (eds.). The Oxford Bible Commentary (first (paperback) ed.). Oxford University Press. pp. 158–176. ISBN 978-0199277186.
- Rösel, Hartmut N. (2011). Joshua. Historical commentary on the Old Testament. Vol. 6 (illustrated ed.). Peeters. ISBN 978-9042925922.
- Würthwein, Ernst (1995). The Text of the Old Testament. Translated by Rhodes, Erroll F. Grand Rapids, MI: Wm. B. Eerdmans. ISBN 0-8028-0788-7.
