= Prayer in the Hebrew Bible =

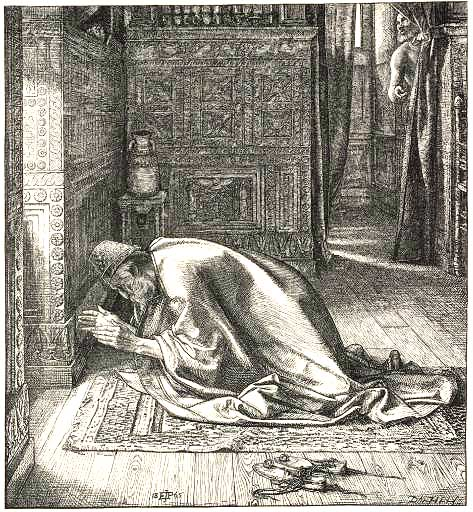
Relief print of Daniel's prayer by Edward Poynter, 1865. Daniel 6 describes how Daniel prayed even though threatened with death, while Daniel 9 records a prayer that he prayed.

Prayer in the Hebrew Bible is an evolving means of interacting with God, most frequently through a spontaneous, individual or collective, unorganized form of petitioning and/or thanking. Standardized prayer such as is done today is non-existent. However, beginning in Deuteronomy, the Bible lays the groundwork for organized prayer including basic liturgical guidelines, and by the Bible's later books, prayer has evolved to a more standardized form, although still radically different from the form practiced by modern Jews.

Individual prayer is described by the Tanakh two ways. The first of these is when prayer is described as occurring, and a result is achieved, but no further information regarding a person's prayer is given. In these instances, such as with Isaac, Moses, Samuel, and Job, the act of praying is a method of changing a situation for the better. The second way in which prayer is depicted is through fully fleshed out episodes of prayer, where a person's prayer is related in full. Many famous biblical personalities have such a prayer, including every major character from Hannah to Hezekiah.

== Individual prayer ==
Often in the Hebrew Bible, individuals spontaneously pray to God when faced with difficulty or having avoided it. As mentioned above, these prayers are not always given in full, however, many are. Certain themes appear throughout the Tanakh's portrayal of this prayer type. One of the most significant is the idea of an argumentation, which is frequently described by the text or its interpreters.

Listed chronologically below are these occurrences of recorded individual prayer.

=== Abraham ===
The first notable prayer whose text is recorded in the Torah and Hebrew Bible occurs when Abraham pleads with God not to destroy the people of Sodom, where his nephew Lot lives. He bargains with God not to destroy the city if there are fifty good men within, and eventually lowers the total to ten. God sends two angels to the city, which is ultimately destroyed with "burning sulfur" when they cannot find the ten requisite good people.

=== Eliezer ===
When Abraham is an old man, he makes his head servant, who while not named specifically, is almost certainly Eliezer of Damascus, promise to find his son Isaac a wife from his people to marry. Eliezer expresses uncertainty that a woman will agree to return to Abraham's household, especially since he is told not to take Isaac with him. In response, Abraham tells Eliezer that God will send an angel to assure his success in his mission. Eliezer, however, upon reaching the town of Nahor's well during evening, when the women of the city would draw water, begins to pray.

Eliezer's prayer makes very specific of God, hoping that God will make clear which woman is to be Isaac's wife. It takes on a petitioning tone, as opposed to the argumentative one prominent in the prayers of other characters, including his master, whose relationship and interactions with God are very different. Before he has finished with his prayer, his requests begin to be granted, and sees that Rebecca is the chosen maiden. Eliezer rushes home with her and she and Isaac are married.

=== Isaac ===
Isaac prays on behalf of his wife Rebecca for a child.

=== Jacob ===
When Jacob is to reunite with his brother Esau, he prays in distress that God save him from what he fears will be an attack on him, his family, and his servants. Similarly to his grandfather Abraham, his prayer lays out an argument, in this case by invoking statements God had made in the past to convince God to aid him. Jacob's prayer does not seem to impact his optimism, for when Esau approaches, he divides his children among his maidservants and wives, so as to protect them from what he still feels is an imminent attack. The Torah, however, when taken literally, describes a joyful meeting, with Esau disregarding formalities so as to embrace his brother, although interpreters suggest Esau actually attacked his younger brother.

=== Moses ===
Moses, the most recurring character in the Torah, prays comparatively little in a truly spontaneous petitioning or thanking form. The one occasion that is most definitely prayer takes place when, in the Book of Exodus, following the making of the Golden Calf, he prays for God to be merciful with his people. The literal reading of the text does not include an argument made by Moses, in a similar manner to other characters, however, Rashi describes him as blaming God for the people's sin, and therefore interprets the prayer to be more similar to those said by Abraham and Jacob.

=== Song of the Sea ===
See: Song of the sea

=== Joshua ===
In the Book of Joshua, the Israelites battle against many different opposing nations. The book's seventh chapter describes how God punishes His people by causing them to lose a battle as a result of their sinning. Following news of the defeat, Joshua and the elders of Israel tear their clothes and lie face down in front of the Ark of the Covenant, and following that, Joshua prays to God bemoaning his people's lowered moral, vulnerability to attack, and possible extermination.

=== Hannah ===
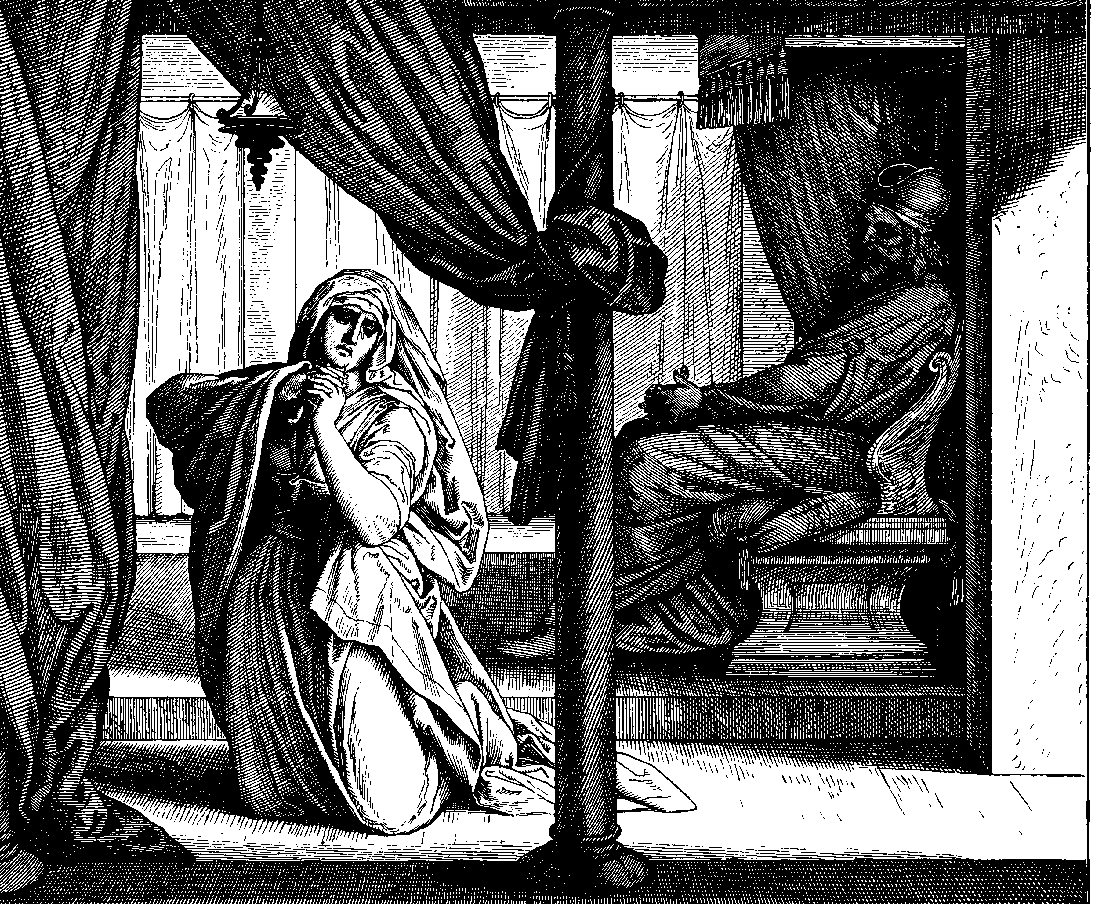
Hannah's prayer, 1860 woodcut by Julius Schnorr von Karolsfeld

In 1 Samuel 1, Hannah prays for a child. 1 Samuel 1:13 says that "Hannah was praying in her heart, and her lips were moving but her voice was not heard" (NIV). The priest Eli thinks that she is drunk, but Hannah protests her innocence. After Hannah gives birth to a son, Samuel, she prays a prayer which is recorded in 1 Samuel 2:1–10. This is normally called the Song of Hannah, but according to 1 Samuel 2:1, it is a prayer.

Eugene Peterson suggests that to Eli, the "normal way of prayer" was "by means of ritual, incense, and animal sacrifice, a gathering of the community directed by a priest." Hannah is "soaring past all the liturgical conventions of her age... She uses her own words, her own voice, without intermediaries."

== Organized prayer ==
Organized prayer is first introduced in the Hebrew Bible in Deuteronomy, when the recitation of prayer over the fruit-bringing sacrifice is mandated, and liturgy is thereby established for the first time. Moses mandates that one who goes to offer the sacrifice recite a basic creed, declaring his people's heritage and history, as well as a prayer of thanks to God for the fruits they have harvested. Moses also requires Israelites to, at certain times, recite a declaration saying they have not transgressed any of the mitzvot.

== See also ==
- Prayer in the New Testament
