= Beeroth (biblical city) =

Biblical city

Coordinates: 31°49′56″N 35°09′07″E

R7 G29 M17 E23 X1 G43
bȝ(j)rtw
in hieroglyphs
Era: New Kingdom
(1550–1069 BC)

Beeroth (Hebrew: בְּאֵרוֹת; Be'erot, lit. "wells"; in LXX Ancient Greek: Βηρωθ) was a Biblical city seven miles northwest of Jerusalem. The city was an ancient Hivite settlement, and is mentioned in Joshua 9:17, 18:25, 2 Samuel 4:2-3, Ezra 2:25 and Nehemiah 7:29. Another town named Beeroth is mentioned in Deuteronomy 10:6.

== Identification ==
Because there are no known ruins for Beeroth, the location of the city is disputed. The most noted source materials are the texts of the Bible, the Onomastikon of Eusebius, the annotations of this same text by Jerome, and the Madaba Map The distance Eusebius gives puts Beeroth somewhere between modern Biddu and Nebi Samwil. The city was part of an Hivite confederacy under the apparent rule of Gibeon, "a royal city" that sued for peace after the Israelites destroyed Jericho and Ai as described in Joshua 9. Later much of the area taken in this initial campaign (including Beeroth) was given to the Tribe of Benjamin as inheritance in Joshua 18. Beeroth may have been the place to which Gideon's youngest son, Joatham or Jotham, fled to escape from Abimelech after his 69 brothers had been killed (Judges 9:21).

The town was then inhabited until the Babylonian captivity in 586 BCE, and the people of this town returned to the area 70 years later as referenced in Ezra and Nehemiah. Whether they re-built and inhabited the town is not described in the text.

Edward Robinson in the early 19th century thought Al-Bireh was the site of Be'eroth, but modern scholars believe Be'eroth should be identified with Khirbet el-Burj near Beit Iksa. Other scholars suggested that it may be modern Biddu, or slightly east of Biddu.

== See also ==
- Cities in the Book of Joshua
