= 1 Samuel 2 =

First Book of Samuel chapter

- ← chapter 1 chapter 3 →
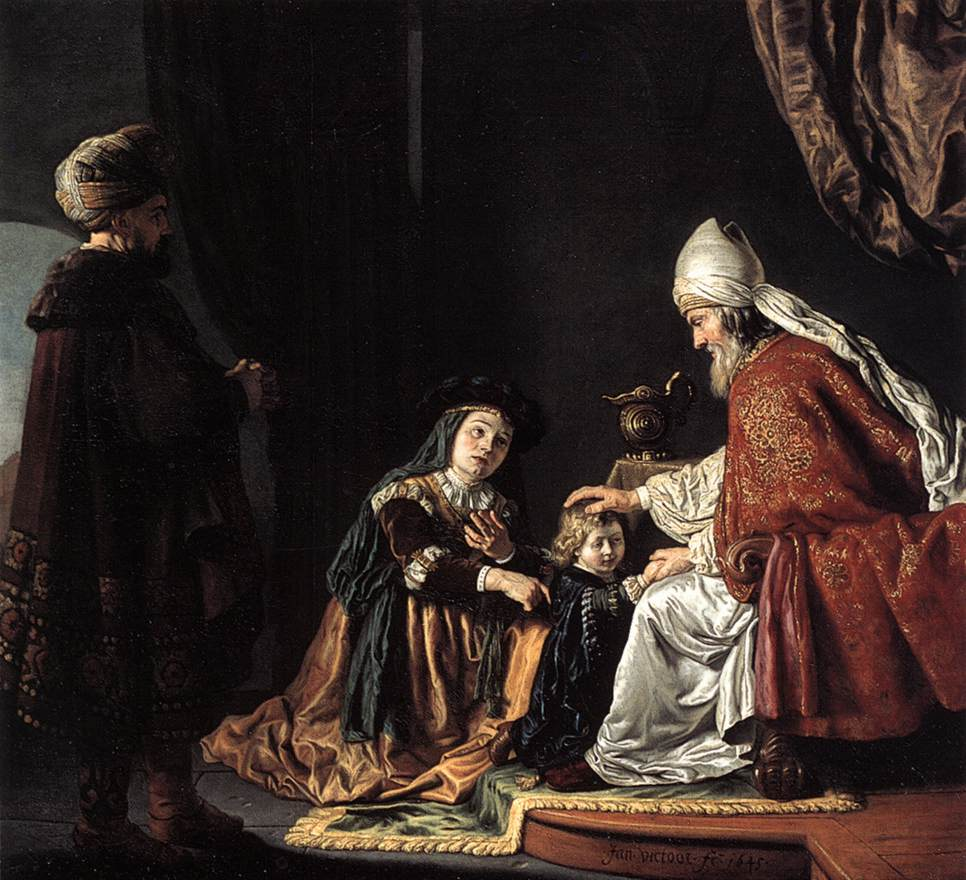
- "Hannah giving her son Samuel to the priest" by Jan Victors, 1645. According to the biblical account, Hannah sang her song when she presented Samuel to Eli the priest.
- Book: Books of Samuel
- Hebrew Bible part: Nevi'im
- Order in the Hebrew part: 3
- Category: Former Prophets
- Christian Bible part: Old Testament
- Order in the Christian part: 9

1 Samuel 2 is the second chapter of the Books of Samuel in the Hebrew Bible or the First Book of Samuel in the Christian Bible. It recounts the Song of Hannah, the corruption of the priests descended from Eli, Samuel's ministry to God "even as a child", and the prophecy of a "man of God" against Eli's household.

== Text ==
The original text of this chapter, as with the rest of the Books of Samuel, was written in Hebrew. Since the division of the Bible into chapters in the late medieval period, this chapter is divided into 36 verses.

=== Textual witnesses ===
Some early manuscripts containing the text of this chapter in Hebrew are of the Masoretic Text tradition, which includes the Codex Cairensis (895), Aleppo Codex (10th century), and Codex Leningradensis (1008). Fragments containing parts of this chapter in Hebrew were found among the Dead Sea Scrolls including 4Q51 (4QSam^{a}; 100–50 BCE) with extant verses 1–10, 16–36.

There is also a difference into Koine Greek known as the Septuagint, made in the last few centuries BCE. Extant ancient manuscripts of the Septuagint version include Codex Vaticanus (B; $\mathfrak{G}$^{B}; 4th century) and Codex Alexandrinus (A; $\mathfrak{G}$^{A}; 5th century). (Note: The whole book of 1 Samuel is missing from the extant Codex Sinaiticus.)

Places mentioned in this chapter

== Period ==
- The event in this chapter happened at the end of judges period in Israel, about 1100 BC.

== Structure ==
The New Revised Standard Version organises this chapter as follows:

- 1 Samuel 2:1–11 = Hannah's Prayer
- 1 Samuel 2:12–17 = Eli’s Wicked Sons
- 1 Samuel 2:18–21 = The Child Samuel at Shiloh
- 1 Samuel 2:22–36 = Prophecy Against Eli’s Household

== Prophecy against Eli's household ==
Verses 22 to 25 introduce a topic dealing with the condemnation of the house of Eli on account of his sons' transgressions. The Masoretic Text of the Hebrew Bible, Targum, and Vulgate translation refer to Hophni and Phinehas' sins including both the misappropriation of food brought to sacrifice at the shrine in Shiloh and also their sexual relations with "the women who assembled at the door of the tabernacle of meeting". The Septuagint and the Dead Sea Scrolls omit the latter issue.

Eli hears of his sons' behaviour and challenges them to reform, but they take no account of his pleading. Then a "man of God" comes to Eli, a prophet of whom, says Donald Spence Jones, "we know nothing".

== See also ==
- Hophni and Phinehas

== Bibliography ==
=== Commentaries on Samuel ===
- Shmuel I – Samuel I (Judaica Press) translation [with Rashi's commentary] at Chabad.org
- Auld, Graeme (2003). "1 & 2 Samuel". In James D. G. Dunn and John William Rogerson (ed.). Eerdmans Commentary on the Bible. Eerdmans. ISBN 9780802837110.
- Bergen, David T. (1996). 1, 2 Samuel. B&H Publishing Group. ISBN 9780805401073.
- Gordon, Robert (1986). I & II Samuel, A Commentary. Paternoster Press. ISBN 9780310230229.
- Hertzberg, Hans Wilhelm (1964). I & II Samuel, A Commentary (trans. from German 2nd edition 1960 ed.). Westminster John Knox Press. p. 19. ISBN 978-0664223182.
- Tsumura, David Toshio (2007). The First Book of Samuel. Eerdmans. ISBN 9780802823595.

=== General ===
- Breytenbach, Andries (2000). "Who Is Behind The Samuel Narrative?". In Johannes Cornelis de Moor and H.F. Van Rooy (ed.). Past, Present, Future: the Deuteronomistic History and the Prophets. Brill. ISBN 9789004118713.
- Halley, Henry H. (1965). Halley's Bible Handbook: an abbreviated Bible commentary (24th (revised) ed.). Zondervan Publishing House. ISBN 0-310-25720-4.
- Jones, Gwilym H (2001). "1 and 2 Samuel". In John Barton and John Muddiman (ed.). The Oxford Bible Commentary. Oxford University Press. ISBN 9780198755005.
- Klein, R.W. (2003). "Samuel, books of". In Bromiley, Geoffrey W (ed.). The International Standard Bible Encyclopedia. Eerdmans. ISBN 9780802837844.
- Würthwein, Ernst (1995). The Text of the Old Testament. Translated by Rhodes, Erroll F. Grand Rapids, MI: Wm. B. Eerdmans. ISBN 0-8028-0788-7.
