= Kiriath-Jearim =

City in Israel

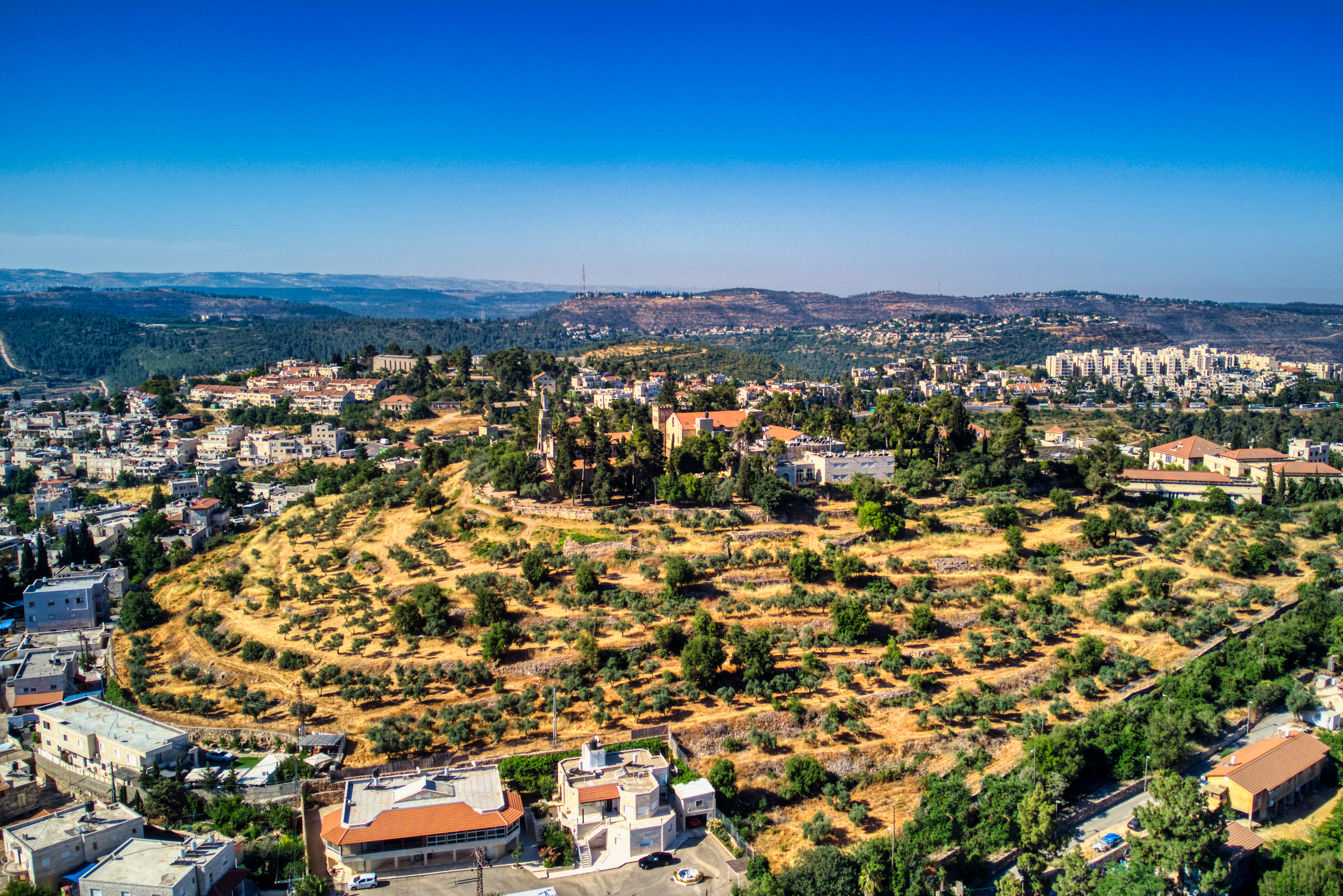
Kiryat Ye'arim, 2022

Kiriath-Jearim (also Kiryat Ye'arim; Hebrew: קִרְיַת-יְעָרִים Qīryaṯ Yə‘ārīm, "city of woods"; Ancient Greek: Καριαθιαριμ Kariathiarim; Latin: Cariathiarim) was a city in the Land of Israel. It is mentioned 18 times in the Hebrew Bible. The biblical place was identified with Abu Ghosh.

== Etymology ==
Other names are Kiriath-Ba'al, Ba'alah and Ba'ale-Judah (see, e.g. Joshua 15:60; 2 Samuel 6:2; 1 Chronicles 13:6), which implies the city was affiliated with Baal worship at an earlier date.

== History ==
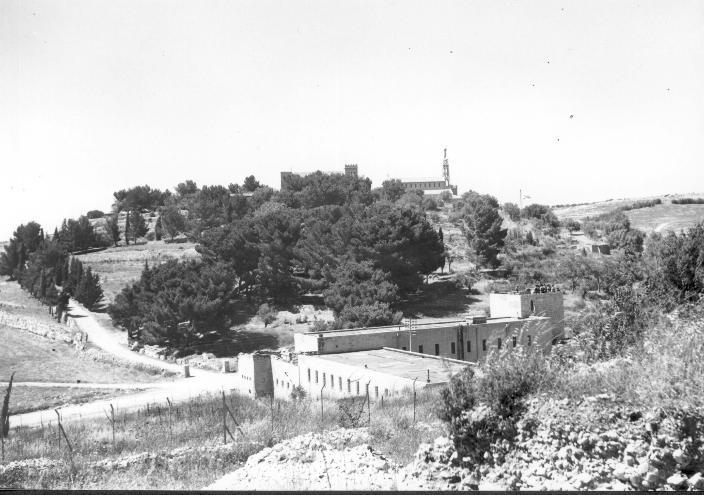
Kiryat Ye'arim, 1948

In Eusebius' Onomasticon, Kiryat Ye'arim is placed about 9 Roman miles, or about 15 km (9 mi), from Jerusalem. Palestine Exploration Fund explorers Claude Reignier Conder and Henderson have identified it with the site now known as Khirbet 'Erma, a ruin located 3.6 kilometres (2.2 mi) south of Kasla and 6.4 kilometres (4.0 mi) east of Beit Shemesh. However, starting with Edward Robinson, biblical Kiriath-Jearim has been more often identified with Deir el-Azar (Tel Qiryat Yearim), a place near Abu Ghosh on a hill where the Deir El-Azar Monastery currently stands, about 7 mi (11 km) west of Jerusalem. This site was the only major biblical site in ancient Judah that had not been excavated, until an excavation began in 2017 by a team from Tel Aviv University and the Collège de France.

Kiriath-Jearim was described as a Hivite city linked to the Gibeonites (see Joshua 9:17). It was a key landmark in identifying the border between the tribes of Judah and Benjamin (see Joshua 15:9 & 18:14, 15). It is mentioned as the place the Ark of the Covenant was moved to after being in Beit Shemesh (1 Samuel 6:21–7:2). More than twenty years afterward, the ark was moved to Jerusalem and placed in a tent outside the palace of David.

Kiriath-Jearim's change in designation from Kiriath-Ba'al (meaning City of Baal, or City of the Lord) may indicate the population change that took place after Joshua's military campaign to take possession of the land from its previous inhabitants. According to Israel Finkelstein and Thomas Romer, the possibility that Kiriath-ba‘al/Ba‘alah was the original name of the town, or more correctly its Northern name, hints that the god YHWH was worshipped as Baal, before that title became a negative link with "foreign" (Phoenician or other) storm gods.

The Hebrew Bible identifies at least one prophet of God who came from this town. Uriah, the son of Shemaiah, was from Kiriath-Jearim, and was a contemporary of Jeremiah who prophesied against Jerusalem (see Jeremiah 26:20). This aroused the wrath of King Jehoiakim (r. 609–598 BC) who sought to put Uriah to death. Uriah escaped to Egypt, where he was apprehended by the king's henchman and extradited to Jerusalem for execution and burial in an unmarked grave (Jeremiah 26:22–23).

The Books of Chronicles identifies Shobal (possibly a descendant of Caleb) as the "father of Kiriath-Jearim" (see 1 Chronicles 2:50–53), possibly in the sense of being the founder of this town.

Descendants of Kiriath-Jearim were among the Jewish exiles who returned to Judea with Zerubbabel (see Nehemiah 7:29).

== See also ==
- List of modern names for biblical place names
