= 1 Samuel 3 =

First Book of Samuel chapter

- ← chapter 2 chapter 4 →
- The pages containing the Books of Samuel (1 & 2 Samuel) in Leningrad Codex (1008 CE).
- Book: First book of Samuel
- Hebrew Bible part: Nevi'im
- Order in the Hebrew part: 3
- Category: Former Prophets
- Christian Bible part: Old Testament
- Order in the Christian part: 9

1 Samuel 3 is the third chapter of the First Book of Samuel in the Old Testament of the Christian Bible or the first part of the Books of Samuel in the Hebrew Bible. According to Jewish tradition the book was attributed to the prophet Samuel, with additions by the prophets Gad and Nathan, but modern scholars view it as a composition of a number of independent texts of various ages from c. 630–540 BCE. In a section concerning the life of Samuel (1 Samuel 1:1–7:17), this chapter focuses on the calling of Samuel. Gwilym Jones places this passage within "the genre of prophetic-call narratives".

== Text ==
This chapter was originally written in Hebrew. It is divided into 21 verses. Some early manuscripts containing the text of this chapter in Hebrew are of the Masoretic Text tradition, which includes the Codex Cairensis (895), Aleppo Codex (10th century), and Codex Leningradensis (1008). Fragments containing parts of this chapter in Hebrew were found among the Dead Sea Scrolls including 4Q51 (4QSam^{a}; 100–50 BCE) with extant verses 1–4, 18–21.

Extant ancient manuscripts of a translation into Koine Greek known as the Septuagint (originally was made in the last few centuries BCE) include Codex Vaticanus (B; $\mathfrak{G}$^{B}; 4th century) and Codex Alexandrinus (A; $\mathfrak{G}$^{A}; 5th century). (Note: The whole book of 1 Samuel is missing from the extant Codex Sinaiticus.)

=== Old Testament references ===
- 1 Samuel 3:3: Exodus 27:20–21; Leviticus 24:2–4 (perpetual lamp)
- 1 Samuel 3:3: Exodus 25:10–22 (ark of God; ark of the Covenant)
- 1 Samuel 3:3: Exodus 26:34 (ark kept at worship center)
Places mentioned in this chapter

== Period ==
The event in this chapter occurred at the end of the era of biblical judges in Israel, about 1100 BC. Verse 1 treats this time as a period when divine visions were infrequent.

== Analysis ==
Chapter 3 is tied in many ways to chapter 2, with some terms and themes in chapter 2 are repeated or recapitulated in chapter 3:

Topic	1 Samuel 2	1 Samuel 3
Samuel ministering before the Lord	2:11, 18	3:1
Did not know the Lord	2:12 (Eli's sons)	3:7 (Samuel)
Judgement on Eli's house	2:10, 31	3:11
Eli did not restrain his sons	2:29 (cf. 2:23–24)	3:13
No atonement or mediation	2:25 ("mediate"; "intercede")	3:14 ("never be atoned")
Sacrifice/offering	2:13, 15, 19, 29	3:14
God sent a messenger	2:27–36 (man of God)	3:10–14 (Samuel)

== God calls Samuel (3:1–14) ==
This section on Samuel's calling is often classified as a "prophetic call narrative", within the tradition of the calling of major prophets (cf. Exodus 3–4; Isaiah 6; Jeremiah 1:4–10; Ezekiel 1:1–3:16). In a period when divine visions were infrequent, Samuel received his call-vision, which would remove the seat of power from Eli and his family. While Eli was still presiding for a short period, he instructed Samuel of the right words of response to God's calling (verses 9–10), but after Samuel received God's oracle (verses 11–14), Samuel became more powerful than Eli before the eyes of the people.

=== Verse 1 ===
Now the boy Samuel was ministering to the Lord before Eli. And the word of the Lord was rare in those days. There was no vision coming forth.

- "The boy": from Hebrew: נַּ֧עַר, na-‘ar, which refers to a "boy from the age of infancy to adolescence". According to Josephus, Samuel was twelve years old at this time.

== Samuel shares his first vision (3:15–21) ==
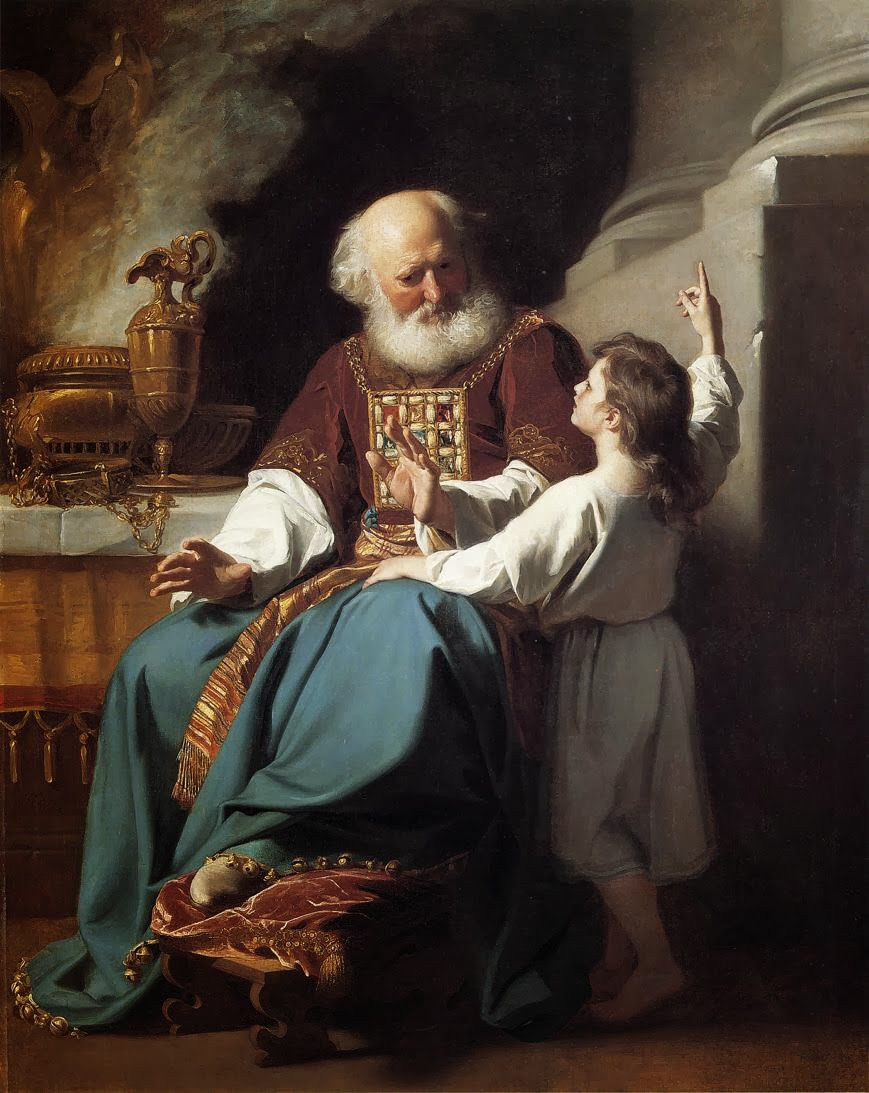
"Samuel Relating to Eli the Judgements of God upon Eli's House". Painting by John Singleton Copley (1780)

Samuel's oracle of doom over Eli's house confirms the words of the man of God in 2:27-36: the house of Eli will fall because of the iniquity of his sons and his own inability to admonish them. Eli accepted God's verdict (verse 18) and that Samuel would become a 'powerful prophet whose words were fulfilled', not only in Shiloh, but throughout the land of Israel (verses 20–21).

=== Verse 19 ===
So Samuel grew, and the Lord was with him and let none of his words fall to the ground.

Jones notes that this verse is indicative both of Samuel's own growth to maturity and his accession to power as a prophet.

=== Verse 20 ===
And all Israel from Dan even to Beersheba knew that Samuel was established to be a prophet of the Lord.

- "From Dan even to Beer-sheba" is a phrase regularly used to denote 'the whole land of Israel', first mentioned in Judges 20:1, then becoming common in the books of Samuel and only appearing once more after the division of the Kingdoms, that is, after the fall of the northern kingdom (2 Chronicles 30:5).
- "Was established": can also be rendered as "was confirmed", "found faithful" or "approved"; from a Hebrew word which in 1 Samuel 2:35 is rendered as 'a faithful priest' and 'a sure house'.

== See also ==
- Eli
- Hophni and Phinehas
- Korban
- Related Bible parts: 1 Samuel 1, 1 Samuel 2

== Sources ==
=== Commentaries on Samuel ===
- Auld, Graeme (2003). "1 & 2 Samuel". In James D. G. Dunn and John William Rogerson (ed.). Eerdmans Commentary on the Bible. Eerdmans. ISBN 9780802837110.
- Bergen, David T. (1996). 1, 2 Samuel. B&H Publishing Group. ISBN 9780805401073.
- Gordon, Robert (1986). I & II Samuel, A Commentary. Paternoster Press. ISBN 9780310230229.
- Hertzberg, Hans Wilhelm (1964). I & II Samuel, A Commentary (trans. from German 2nd edition 1960 ed.). Westminster John Knox Press. p. 19. ISBN 978-0664223182.
- Tsumura, David Toshio (2007). The First Book of Samuel. Eerdmans. ISBN 9780802823595.

=== General ===
- Breytenbach, Andries (2000). "Who Is Behind The Samuel Narrative?". In Johannes Cornelis de Moor and H.F. Van Rooy (ed.). Past, Present, Future: the Deuteronomistic History and the Prophets. Brill. ISBN 9789004118713.
- Coogan, Michael David (2007). Coogan, Michael David; Brettler, Marc Zvi; Newsom, Carol Ann; Perkins, Pheme (eds.). The New Oxford Annotated Bible with the Apocryphal/Deuterocanonical Books: New Revised Standard Version, Issue 48 (Augmented 3rd ed.). Oxford University Press. ISBN 978-0195288810.
- Fitzmyer, Joseph A. (2008). A Guide to the Dead Sea Scrolls and Related Literature. Grand Rapids, MI: William B. Eerdmans Publishing Company. ISBN 9780802862419.
- Halley, Henry H. (1965). Halley's Bible Handbook: an abbreviated Bible commentary (24th (revised) ed.). Zondervan Publishing House. ISBN 0-310-25720-4.
- Hayes, Christine (2015). Introduction to the Bible. Yale University Press. ISBN 978-0300188271.
- Jones, Gwilym H. (2007). "12. 1 and 2 Samuel". In Barton, John; Muddiman, John (eds.). The Oxford Bible Commentary (first (paperback) ed.). Oxford University Press. pp. 196–232. ISBN 978-0199277186.
- Klein, R.W. (2003). "Samuel, books of". In Bromiley, Geoffrey W (ed.). The International Standard Bible Encyclopedia. Eerdmans. ISBN 9780802837844.
- Knight, Douglas A (1995). "Chapter 4 Deuteronomy and the Deuteronomists". In James Luther Mays, David L. Petersen and Kent Harold Richards (ed.). Old Testament Interpretation. T&T Clark. ISBN 9780567292896.
- Ulrich, Eugene, ed. (2010). The Biblical Qumran Scrolls: Transcriptions and Textual Variants. Brill.
- Würthwein, Ernst (1995). The Text of the Old Testament. Translated by Rhodes, Erroll F. Grand Rapids, MI: Wm. B. Eerdmans. ISBN 0-8028-0788-7.
