= Song of Hannah =

Poem interpreting the Books of Samuel

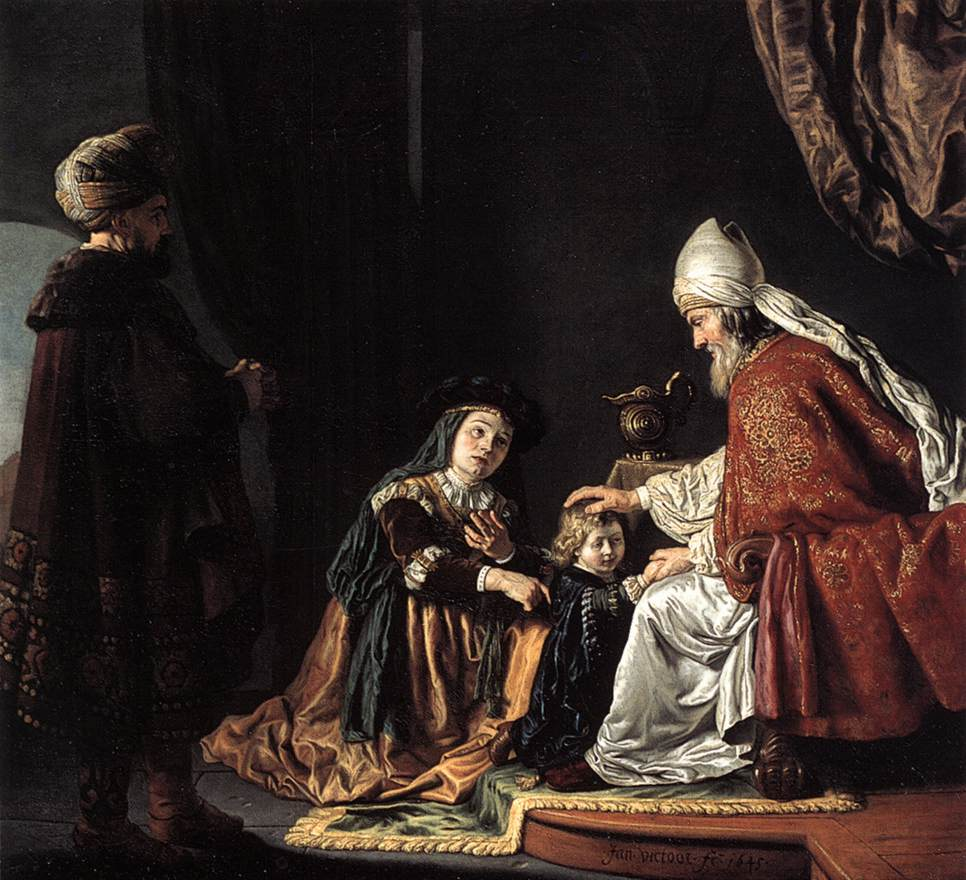
Hannah giving her son Samuel to the priest by Jan Victors, 1645. According to the biblical account, Hannah sang her song when she presented Samuel to Eli the priest.

The Song of Hannah is a poem interpreting the prose text of the Books of Samuel. According to the surrounding narrative, the poem, 1 Samuel 2:1–10, was a prayer delivered by Hannah to give thanks to God for the birth of her son, Samuel. It is similar to Psalm 113 and the Christian Magnificat.

== Contents and themes ==
Hannah praises Yahweh, reflects on the reversals he accomplishes, and looks forward to his king.

There is a movement in this song from the particular to the general. It opens with Hannah's own gratitude for a local reversal, and closes with God's defeat of his enemies – a cosmic reversal.

Through the theme of reversal, the Song of Hannah functions as an introduction to the whole book. Keil and Delitzsch argue that Hannah's experience of reversal was a pledge of how God "would also lift up and glorify his whole nation, which was at that time so deeply bowed down and oppressed by its foes."

The reference to a king in verse 10 has provoked considerable discussion. Biblical commentator A. F. Kirkpatrick argues that this does not imply a late date for the song, since "the idea of a king was not altogether novel to the Israelite mind" and "amid the prevalent anarchy and growing disintegration of the nation, amid internal corruption and external attack, the desire for a king was probably taking definite shape in the popular mind."

Walter Brueggemann suggests that the Song of Hannah paves the way for a major theme of the Book of Samuel, the "power and willingness of Yahweh to intrude, intervene and invert."

== Text ==
=== English ===
And Hannah prayed and said:

“My heart rejoices in the Lord; my strength is exalted in the Lord. I smile at my enemies, because I rejoice in Your salvation.

“No one is holy like the Lord, for there is none besides You, nor is there any rock like our God.

“Talk no more so very proudly; let no arrogance come from your mouth, for the Lord is the God of knowledge; and by Him actions are weighed.

“The bows of the mighty men are broken, and those who stumbled are girded with strength. Those who were full have hired themselves out for bread, and the hungry have ceased to hunger. Even the barren has borne seven, and she who has many children has become feeble.

“The Lord kills and makes alive; He brings down to the grave and brings up. The Lord makes poor and makes rich; He brings low and lifts up. He raises the poor from the dust and lifts the beggar from the ash heap, to set them among princes and make them inherit the throne of glory.

“For the pillars of the earth are the Lord’s, and He has set the world upon them. He will guard the feet of His saints, but the wicked shall be silent in darkness.

“For by strength no man shall prevail. The adversaries of the Lord shall be broken in pieces; from heaven He will thunder against them. The Lord will judge the ends of the earth. “He will give strength to His king, and exalt the strength of His anointed.”

(1 Samuel 2:1–10 New King James Version)

== Identity of persons referred to in the song ==
The first 10 verses of 1 Samuel 2 record her song of praise to the Lord for answering her petition. The attribution of this song to Hannah distinguishes her among biblical personages. Her song is essentially a hymn of praise to God for good fortune and includes many themes of Israel's national culture. Fertility and childbirth are thus included as equal in importance to other motifs and worthy of Israel's singers.

=== Samuel ===
According to some contributors to the classical Rabbinic literature, the first half of the poem was a prophecy predicting Samuel's later role as a prophet, that her great-grandson would be a musician in the Jerusalem Temple, that Sennacherib would destroy the Kingdom of Israel, that Nebuchadnezzar would fall from power, and that the Babylonian Captivity would come to an end.

=== David ===
Although the "king" of verse 10 is left unspecified, the blessings to the king and "the anointed" form a clear parallel with 2 Samuel 22, which finishes with Yahweh being a tower of salvation to his selected king and showing mercy to his anointed one (2 Samuel 22:51).

== Use ==
=== Judaism ===
In Judaism, the song of Hannah is regarded as the model for reverent, personal prayer, and it is read on the first day of Rosh Hashanah—the first day of the Hebrew year—as the haftarah portion in the synagogue.

=== Christianity ===
==== Magnificat ====
The poem has several features in common with the Magnificat, which was sung in early Christian circles and continues to be regularly sung or recited in many Christian denominations. Common features across Christian denominations include the themes and the order in which they appear in the Magnificat. A number of Christian scholars believe that the apostle Luke used the song of Hannah as the basis of the Magnificat. Charles Anang and others see Hannah as a "type" of Mary. Both "handmaids" of God, via divine intervention, bore sons—Samuel to Hannah and Jesus to Mary—uniquely dedicated to God.

==== Church practice ====
The song of Hannah is also known as the "Canticle of Anna" in Roman Catholicism and is one of seven Old Testament (Hebrew Bible) canticles in the Catholic Church's breviary. It is used for Lauds on Wednesdays.

In the Revised Common Lectionary, which provides the appointed Christian scripture readings used by most mainline Protestant denominations, the song of Hannah is recited or sung as the congregational response to the first lesson for proper 28 in year B among churches following track 1.

== See also ==
- 1 Samuel 2
- Luke 1
- Magnificat - Mary's Magnificat echoes the Song of Hannah
