= 1100s BC (decade) =

Decade

The 1100s BC is a decade that lasted from 1109 BC to 1100 BC.

== Events and trends ==
- 1104 BC—Foundation of Cádiz, Spain.
- 1100 BC—Tiglath-Pileser I of Assyria conquers the Hittites.
- c. 1100 BC—Maya Calendar counts time from this point.
- c. 1100 BC—The Dorians invade Ancient Greece.
- c. 1100 BC—Mycenaean era ends with the destruction of that civilization. The collapse of Mycenaean dominance starts.
- c. 1100 BC—Late Minoan culture ends.
- c. 1100 BC—Greek Dark Ages begin.
- c. 1100 BC—Beginning of the proto-Villanovan culture in northern Italy.
- c. 1100 BC—The New Kingdom in Egypt comes to an end.
- c. 1100 BC—The Shang dynasty ends in China.
- c. 1100 BC—Kurukshetra War begins in Later Vedic period in Kuru kingdom.

== Significant people ==
- c. 1102 BC—Samuel is born.

== Inventions, discoveries, introductions ==
- Alphabet, developed by Phoenicians.
- MUL.APIN, developed by Assyrians: an ancient catalog of constellations.
